= Timeline of Brazilian history =

This is a timeline of Brazilian history, comprising important legal and territorial changes and political events in Brazil and its predecessor states. To read about the background to these events, see History of Brazil.

== 10th century ==
Year	Date	Event
1000		Marajoara culture flourishes as an Amazonian center.

== 15th century ==
Year	Date	Event
1492–1502		Voyages of Christopher Columbus: navigator Christopher Columbus, sailing in the employ of Castile and Aragon, departed from Palos de la Frontera in search of a westward route to the East Indies.
1494	7 June	Treaty of Tordesillas: Spain and Portugal divide the New World between themselves. Even though the treaty was negotiated without consulting the Pope, a few sources call the resulting line the "Papal Line of Demarcation".
1500		Spanish navigator Vicente Yáñez Pinzón lands in the coast of Brazil but is prevented from claiming it by the Treaty of Tordesillas.
1500	22 April	Portuguese navigator Pedro Álvares Cabral officially discovers Brazil and claims the land for the Kingdom of Portugal. He has 13 vessels with him.
1500	18 July	Amerigo Vespucci Letter from Seville describes experiences on Alonso de Ojeda's May 1499 voyage. The letter is notable for its description of the Brazilian coast and its inhabitants.

== 16th century ==
Year	Date	Event
1502	1 January	Portuguese explorers, led either by Gaspar de Lemos or Gonçalo Coelho, sail into Guanabara Bay, Brazil, which they name Rio de Janeiro.
1502		Beginning of the exploitation of brazilwood.
1502		The Trindade and Martin Vaz Islands are discovered in 1502 by Portuguese navigators led by Estêvão da Gama, and, along with Brazil, became part of the Portuguese Empire.
1503	10 August	The Fernando de Noronha island is discovered by a Portuguese expedition, organized and financed by a private commercial consortium headed by the Lisbon merchant Fernão de Loronha. The expedition is under the overall command of captain Gonçalo Coelho and carries the Italian adventurer Amerigo Vespucci aboard, who writes an account of it.
1516		The first sugar cane mills appear in Pernambuco.
1527		Cristóvão Jacques imprisons three French galleons in Recôncavo, Bahia. But having acted with barbarity towards the prisoners, this gesture eventually caused him major problems with Dom João III.
1530–1533		Martim Afonso de Sousa's expedition patrols the Brazilian coast, banishes the French, and creates the first colonial town: São Vicente.
1531		Bertrand d'Ornesan tries to establish a French trading post at Pernambuco.
1532	22 January	São Vicente is established as the first permanent Portuguese settlement in Brazil.
1534		The Captaincies of Brazil are established by King Dom João III. Colonial Brazil is divided into fifteen captaincies
1534–1536		Iguape War in the region of São Vicente.
1537	12 March	The Portuguese establish Recife in Pernambuco, in the Northeast of Brazil.
1539–1542		The first African slaves arrive in Pernambuco.
1549	29 March	The city of Salvador, Brazil's first capital, is founded by Tomé de Sousa.
1551		Portugal founds a sugar colony at Bahia.
1554	25 January	Missionaries Joseph of Anchieta and Manuel da Nóbrega establish São Paulo, then named São Paulo dos Campos de Piratininga, in southeast Brazil.
1557		German adventurer Hans Staden publishes a widely translated account of his detention by the Tupi people of Brazil, Warhaftige Historia und beschreibung eyner Landtschafft der Wilden Nacketen, Grimmigen Menschfresser-Leuthen in der Newenwelt America gelegen ("True Story and Description of a Country of Wild, Naked, Grim, Man-eating People in the New World, America").
1560	17 March	Fort Coligny on Villegagnon Island in Rio de Janeiro is attacked and destroyed during the Portuguese campaign against France Antarctique.
1565	1 March	Estácio de Sá founds Rio de Janeiro as São Sebastião do Rio de Janeiro.
1580	25 March	Iberian Union: King Philip II of Spain becomes King of Portugal under the name Philip I, following the death without heirs of King Henry of Portugal, in a personal union of the crowns, thus maintaining Portuguese independence (in Europe and throughout the Portuguese Empire, including Brazil). The Philippine Dynasty rule lasts until 1640.
1588–1591		English privateer Thomas Cavendish loots Santos and São Vicente before losing most of the crew in a battle against the Portuguese at the village of Vitória.
1595	30 March – April	Anglo–Spanish War: an English military expedition led by James Lancaster captures Recife.

== 17th century ==
Year	Date	Event
1608		Thornton expedition: a Tuscan expedition under Captain Robert Thornton, sent by Ferdinando I of Tuscany to explore northern Brazil and the Amazon River and prepare for the establishment of a settlement in northern coastal South America, which would serve as a base to export Brazilian wood to Renaissance Italy. which would be colonised by France in 1630. The expedition was the only attempt by an Italian state to colonise the Americas.
1612	8 September	São Luís is founded by the French, who intend to make it the center of the Equinoctial France. They build a fort named Saint-Louis de Maragnan after King Louis XIII and his Saintly ancestor Louis IX.
1616		6-year-old António Vieira arrives from Portugal, with his parents, in Salvador in Colonial Brazil where he will become a diplomat, noted author, leading figure of the Church, and protector of local indigenous peoples.
1616		Physician Aleixo de Abreu is granted a pension of 16,000 reis for services to the crown in Angola and Brazil by Philip III of Spain, who also appoints him physician of his chamber.
1616		A slave ship carries smallpox from the Kingdom of Kongo to Salvador.
1616	12 January	The city of Belém, Brazil, is founded on the Amazon River delta by the Portuguese captain Francisco Caldeira Castelo Branco, who had previously taken the city of São Luís in Maranhão from the French.
1624		The Dutch West India Company invades the Portuguese colony of Bahia in Brazil.
1625	30 April	The Portuguese recapture Salvador from the Dutch, with the help of a combined Spanish and Portuguese force, consisting of 52 ships and 12,500 men.
1630		The Dutch West India Company invades the Portuguese colony of Pernambuco and founds Dutch Brazil.
1631	12 September	Eighty Years' War: a Spanish fleet under the command of admiral Antonio de Oquendo defeats a Dutch fleet off the coast of Brazil in the Battle of Albrolhos.
1641		The first Rio Carnival happens to celebrate Dom João IV's coronation as king of Portugal.
1641	11 March	Guaraní forces living in the Jesuit missions defeat bandeirantes loyal to the Portuguese Empire at the Battle of Mbororé in present-day Panambí, Argentina.
1642		Isaac Aboab da Fonseca is appointed rabbi in Pernambuco, thus becoming the first rabbi of the Americas.
1644	6 May	Johan Mauritius resigns as Governor of Dutch Brazil.
1648	19 April	First Battle of Guararapes: the Portuguese army defeats the Dutch army in northeast Brazil.
1649	19 February	Second Battle of Guararapes: decisive Portuguese victory against the Dutch in northeast Brazil.
1654		After several years of open warfare, the Dutch withdraw from Brazil; the Portuguese paid off a war debt in payments of salt.
1661		Treaty of The Hague: the Dutch Republic recognizes Portuguese imperial sovereignty over New Holland (Dutch Brazil).
1684		Beckman Revolt in Maranhão.
1693		Gold is found near modern-day cities of Sabará, Caeté and Ouro Preto, beginning of the Brazilian Gold Rush.
1694	6 February	The runaway slave colony of Quilombo dos Palmares is destroyed.
1694	8 March	The Casa da Moeda do Brasil is established by the Portuguese in Salvador.
1695	20 November	Quilombo dos Palmares ruler Zumbi is captured and beheaded.

== 18th century ==
Year	Date	Event
1707–1709		War of the Emboabas in modern-day Minas Gerais.
1710–1711		The Mascate War pits merchants of Recife against the planters of nearby Olinda.
1711		São Paulo officially becomes a city.
1720	28 June	The Vila Rica Revolt, also known as the Filipe dos Santos Revolt, was held against the Portuguese Crown.
1720	12 September	The Captaincy of Minas Gerais is established, after being separated from the Captaincy of São Paulo and Minas de Ouro.
1722		Expedition led by the second Anhanguera discovers gold in present-day Goiás.
1727		Lt. Col. Francisco de Mello Palheta smuggles coffee seeds to Brazil in a bouquet, starting a coffee empire.
1750	13 January	The Treaty of Madrid between Spain and Portugal authorizes a larger Brazil than had the Treaty of Tordesillas of 1494, which originally established the boundaries of the Portuguese and Spanish territories in South America.
1756	February	The Guaraní War takes place between the Guaraní tribes of seven Jesuit missions and joint Spanish-Portuguese forces.
1759		Jesuits are expelled from Brazil by the Marquis of Pombal. Indians left without protection.
1763		The capital of Colonial Brazil is transferred from Salvador to Rio de Janeiro, which is located closer to the mining region and provides a harbor to ship the gold to Europe.
1772		The Kingdom of Portugal divides its colony of the State of Great-Pará and Maranhão into the State of Great-Pará (capital, Belém) and the State of Maranhão (capital, São Luis).
1775		The Kingdom of Portugal reunites its South American colonies of the State of Brazil, the State of Great-Pará, and the State of Maranhão into the Colony of Brazil. Rio de Janeiro is the capital.
1788–1789		Inconfidência Mineira, conspiracy against the colonial authorities in Brazil.
1792	21 April	Tiradentes, prime figure in the Inconfidência Mineira plot, is executed in Rio de Janeiro.
1798		Revolt of the Alfaiates in Bahia.

== 19th century ==
Year	Date	Event
1807	29 November	The Portuguese Queen Maria I and the Court embark at Lisbon bound for Brazil. Rio de Janeiro becomes the capital of the Portuguese Empire.
1808	22 January	The Braganza Royal Family arrives in Brazil, fleeing from the French army.
1808	13 June	The Rio de Janeiro Botanical Garden is founded by King John VI of Portugal.
1808	12 October	Banco do Brasil is founded by then prince regent John (later King John VI of Portugal) to finance the kingdom's public debt.
1809	6–14 January	Napoleonic Wars: Brazilian and Portuguese forces conquer French Guiana.
1812		The first official group of Chinese immigrants to Brazil for Tea planters in Rio de Janeiro during the period of the Portuguese Royal family in Brazil.
1815		The United Kingdom of Portugal, Brazil and the Algarves is established under Queen Maria I. Brazil is elevated from the status of Portuguese colony to a constituent kingdom of the united kingdom.
1817	March	The French Artistic Mission in Brazil comes to Rio de Janeiro.
1817	13 May	Prince Pedro is married by proxy to Maria Leopoldina of Austria.
1817		The Pernambuco Revolt breaks out.
1819	4 November	The first 1,400 non-Portuguese immigrants arrive from Switzerland.
1821		Portugal enters a severe political crisis that obliges John VI and the royal family to return to Portugal.
1822	9 January	Prince regent Pedro of Braganza refuses to comply with the Portuguese cortes order to return to Portugal (Dia do Fico).
1822	7 September	Prince Pedro proclaims the Brazilian independence on 7 September.
1822	1 December	Prince Pedro is crowned as emperor Pedro I of Brazil.
1822–1825		Brazilian War of Independence.
1824		Confederation of the Equator rebellion in the Northeast.
1824		The Constitution of 1824 is adopted.
1824	26 May	The United States become the first country to recognize the independence of Brazil.
1825	13 January	Frei Caneca and other leaders of the Confederation of the Equator rebellion are executed in Recife.
1825	25 August	Uruguay is declared independent of the Empire of Brazil by the Thirty-Three Orientals, a militant revolutionary group led by Juan Antonio Lavalleja.
1826	11 December	Empress Maria Leopoldina dies after suffering a miscarriage.
1828	26 April	Treaty of Commerce and Navigation signed between Brazil and Denmark, establishing diplomatic relations between the two countries.
1828	9–11 July	Irish and German Mercenary Soldiers' revolt rebellion breaks out.
1828	2 August	Dom Pedro I is married by proxy to Amélie of Leuchtenberg.
1828	27 August	Treaty of Montevideo: Brazil and Argentina recognize the independence of Uruguay.
1831	7 April	Dom Pedro I abdicates in favor of his 5-year-old son Dom Pedro II, who will reign for almost 59 years. The regency period begins.
1831	7 November	Slave trading is forbidden in Brazil, the law is largely ignored.
1834	12 August	The Additional Act provides for the establishment of the Provincial Legislative Assemblies, extinction of the State Council, replacement of the Triumviral Regency, and introduction of a direct and secret ballot.
1834	24 September	Former Brazilian emperor Pedro I dies in Lisbon.
1835	January	Malê revolt in Salvador.
1835	20 September	Ragamuffin War begins in Rio Grande do Sul with the capture of Porto Alegre.
1836	11 September	The Riograndense Republic is proclaimed in southern Brazil following the battle of Seival.
1838–1841		Balaiada revolt in Maranhão.
1840	23 July	Pedro II is prematurely declared "of age" and begins to reassert central control in Brazil.
1840		Last remaining rebel group of the Cabanagem revolt, under the leadership of Gonçalo Jorge de Magalhães, surrenders.
1841	18 July	Coronation ceremony of emperor Pedro II of Brazil in Rio de Janeiro.
1842		Liberal rebellions of 1842.
1843	20 January	Honório Hermeto Carneiro Leão, Marquis of Paraná, becomes de facto first prime minister of the Empire of Brazil.
1843	4 September	The Emperor Dom Pedro II of Brazil marries Dona Teresa Cristina of the Two Sicilies in a state ceremony in Rio de Janeiro Cathedral.
1845	1 March	Ragamuffin War: peace negotiations led by Lima e Silva and Antônio Vicente da Fontoura conclude with the signing of the Ponche Verde Treaty between the two sides, in Dom Pedrito.
1845	9 August	The Aberdeen Act is passed by the Parliament of the United Kingdom empowering the British Royal Navy to search Brazilian ships as part of the abolition of the slave trade from Africa.
1847	11 June	Afonso dies at age two, leaving his father Pedro II without a male heir.
1848–1849		Praieira revolt in Pernambuco.
1850	4 September	Eusébio de Queirós Law abolishes the international slave trade in the country.
1851–1852		The Platine War ends and the Empire of Brazil has the hegemony over South America.
1852	3 February	Platine War: Battle of Caseros, Argentina: the Argentine provinces of Entre Rios and Corrientes allied with Brazil and members of Colorado Party of Uruguay, defeat the Argentine Confederation under Juan Manuel de Rosas.
1854	30 April	The first railway in Brazil is inaugurated by Pedro II in Rio de Janeiro, built by industrialist Irineu Evangelista de Sousa.
1859	5 May	Border Treaty between Brazil and Venezuela: the two countries agree their borders should be traced at the water divide between the Amazon and the Orinoco basins.
1862	26 June	Brazil adopts the Metric system.
1864	7 October	American Civil War: Bahia incident: USS Wachusett illegally captures the CSS Florida Confederate raider while in port in Bahia, Brazil, in violation of Brazilian neutrality.
1864–1865		Uruguayan War: forces of the Empire of Brazil invade Uruguay in support of Venancio Flores' Colorado Party.
1865	1 May	The Triple Alliance of Argentina, Brazil, and Uruguay against Paraguay is formally signed; the Paraguayan War begins.
1865	11 June	Paraguayan War: Battle of Riachuelo: the Imperial Brazilian Navy squadron defeats the Paraguayan Navy on the Riachuelo stream.
1867	27 March	The Treaty of Ayacucho is signed between the Empire of Brazil and Bolivia, Brazil assigns the land of Acre to Bolivia in exchange for 102,400 sq kilometers of territory further annexed to the Amazonas.
1868	5 January	Paraguayan War: Brazilian Army commander Luís Alves de Lima e Silva enters Asunción, Paraguay's capital. Some days later he declares the war is over. Nevertheless, Francisco Solano López, Paraguay's president, prepares guerrillas to fight in the countryside.
1868	6 December	Paraguayan War: Battle of Ytororó: Field-Marshal Luís Alves de Lima e Silva leads 13,000 Brazilian troops against a Paraguayan fortified position of 5,000 troops.
1870	1 March	End of the Paraguayan War. Francisco Solano López is defeated and killed in the Battle of Cerro Corá.
1871	7 March	José Paranhos, Viscount of Rio Branco, becomes Prime Minister of the Empire of Brazil, serving for 4 years.
1871	28 September	Law of Free Birth, or Rio Branco Law, is passed by the Brazilian Parliament, intending to provide freedom to all newborn children of slaves, and slaves of the state or crown.
1872	9 January	In the aftermath of the Paraguayan War, the new government of Paraguay makes peace with Brazil, granting reparations and territorial concessions.
1872		Brazil conducts its first official census, the population is 9,930,478.
1873–1874		Revolt of the Muckers in Rio Grande do Sul.
1876	28 April	Francisco, a slave, becomes the last person to be executed in Brazil, after murdering his masters, being hanged in Pilar, Alagoas.
1877–1878		Grande Seca (Great Drought) in Northeastern Brazil.
1882		Brazilian Anthropological Exhibition of 1882.
1883	30 September	Mossoró, in the province of Rio Grande do Norte, is the first city in Brazil to abolish slavery.
1885	28 September	Sexagenarian Law, or Saraiva-Cotegipe Law, which frees slaves over the age of 60, is passed.
1888	13 May	The Lei Áurea abolishes the last remnants of slavery.
1889	15 November	Field Marshal Deodoro da Fonseca organizes a military coup which deposes Emperor Pedro II of Brazil and abolishes the Brazilian monarchy. Deodoro da Fonseca proclaims Brazil a Republic and forms a Provisional Government.
1889	17 November	The Brazilian Imperial Family is forced into exile in France.
1889	19 November	The modern-day flag of Brazil is adopted by the Provisional Government of the Republic.
1889	20 November	Argentina is the first country to recognize the abolition of the monarchy in Brazil.
1891	November	First revolt of the Armada.
1891	15 November	The constitution of the First Brazilian Republic is promulgated.
1891	23 November	President Deodoro da Fonseca resigns as a consequence of the first revolt of the Armada, vice president Floriano Peixoto succeeds to the presidency.
1891	5 December	Deposed emperor Dom Pedro II dies in Paris, France aged 66.
1893		American James Harden-Hickey claimed the Trindade island and declares himself as James I, Prince of Trinidad. According to James Harden-Hickey's plans, Trinidad, after being recognized as an independent country, would become a military dictatorship and have him as dictator. He designed postage stamps, a national flag, and a coat of arms; established a chivalric order, the "Cross of Trinidad"; bought a schooner to transport colonists; appointed M. le Comte de la Boissiere as Secretary of State; opened a consular office at 217 West 36th Street in New York; and even issued government bonds to finance construction of infrastructure on the island. Despite his plans, his idea was ridiculed or ignored by the world.
1893–1894	November	Second revolt of the Armada.
1894	January	Rio de Janeiro Affair: a series of incidents during the Brazilian Naval Revolt.
1894	27 June	Federalist Revolution: Battle of Passo Fundo in the state of Rio Grande do Sul
1894	15 September	Inauguration of Prudente de Morais as president.
1895		The Federalist Revolution comes to an end.
1895	July	The British again tried to take possession of the strategic Trindade island in the Atlantic. The British planned to use the island as a cable station. However, Brazilian diplomatic efforts, along with Portuguese support, reinstated Trindade Island to Brazilian sovereignty.
1895	5 November	Japan establishes diplomatic relations with Brazil.
1895	17 November	Flamengo, a well known professional football club in Brazil, is officially founded.
1897	24 January	In order to clearly demonstrate sovereignty over the Trindade island, now part of the State of Espírito Santo and the municipality of Vitória, a landmark is built. Nowadays, Brazilian presence is marked by a permanent Brazilian Navy base on the main island.
1897	5 October	Canudos War: after a long siege, Brazilian government troops take Canudos in Northeastern Brazil, crushing Antônio Conselheiro and his followers.
1897	12 October	The City of Belo Horizonte, Brazil is created. The construction of the second Brazilian planned city is completed successfully.
1898	1 March	In the presidential election, Manuel Ferraz de Campos Sales of the Republican Party of São Paulo, is successful, with 90.9% of the vote.
1899	14 July	The First Republic of Acre is declared.
1900	25 April	The Republic of Acre is reincorporated into Bolivia, with Brazilian help.

== 20th century ==
Year	Date	Event
1901	19 October	Aviator Alberto Santos-Dumont wins the Deutsch de la Meurthe prize with a flight that rounds the Eiffel Tower.
1902	1 March	Presidential election: Rodrigues Alves of the Republican Party of São Paulo receives 91.7% of the vote. Francisco Silviano de Almeida Brandão is elected vice president, but dies suddenly before the start of his term of office.
1902	26 October	The first season of competitive football in Brazil concludes with a victory for São Paulo Athletic Club.
1902	3 December	José Paranhos, Baron of Rio Branco, is appointed Minister of Foreign Affairs. His ten-year tenure would be the longest in the country's history.
1903	11 November	The Treaty of Petrópolis ends tension between Brazil and Bolivia over the then-Bolivian territory of Acre (today the Acre state).
1904	14 October	The National Congress of Brazil approves a large naval acquisition programme.
1904	10–16 November	Vaccine Revolt in Rio de Janeiro.
1904		The Evangelical Lutheran Church of Brazil is founded in Rio Grande do Sul.
1904		Ford begin selling cars in Brazil.
1905	30 December	Law no. 1452 is passed by the National Congress of Brazil, authorizing expenditure of £4,214,550 for new warship construction (£1,685,820 in 1906).
1906	21 January	The Brazilian battleship Aquidabã sinks, after its powder magazines explode, near the Jacuacanga strait, in Angra dos Reis bay. A total of 212 people are killed, including three admirals and most of the ship's officers; 98 survive.
1906	1 March	In the presidential election, Afonso Pena of the Minas Gerais Republican Party receives 97.9% of the vote.
1906	5 May	The Treaty of Limits between Brazil and the Netherlands is signed in Rio de Janeiro, establishing the international boundary between Brazil and the Dutch colony of Suriname.
1906	23 October	An aeroplane of Alberto Santos-Dumont takes off at Bagatelle in France and flies 60 meters (200 feet). This is the first officially recorded powered flight in Europe.
1906	9 November	The Brazilian Flag Anthem ("Hino à Bandeira Nacional"), with lyrics by Olavo Bilac and music by Francisco Braga, is performed for the first time.
1907		Construction of the Madeira-Mamoré Railroad begins, linking the cities of Porto Velho and Guajará-Mirim.
1907	24 April	The Vásquez Cobo–Martins treaty between Brazil and Colombia is signed, establishing the border from the Rio Negro northwestward along the Amazon River-Orinoco watershed divide, "then generally southward along various river courses and straight-line segments to the mouth of the Apaporis River".
1908	16 June	The Kasato Maru arrives at the Port of Santos with the first official group of Japanese immigrants to Brazil.
1908	10 September	The first Minas Geraes-class Dreadnought battleship for Brazil, Minas Geraes, is launched at Armstrong Whitworth's yard on the River Tyne in England, catalysing the "South American dreadnought race".
1908	30 October	Pedro de Alcântara, Prince of Grão-Pará, renounces his claim on the Brazilian throne in order to marry Countess Elisabeth Dobržensky de Dobrženicz.
1909	8 September	The Velarde-Río Branco treaty between Brazil and Peru is signed, establishing borders south of the Yavarí.
1910	1 March	In the presidential election, Hermes da Fonseca receives 57.1% of the vote. Fonseca is supported by several of the most influential Republican parties, whilst his main opponent, Ruy Barbosa, is supported by the Civilist Campaign.
1910	22 November	Revolt of the Lash: the mostly black crews of four Brazilian warships, led by João Cândido, mutiny shortly after a sailor receives 250 lashes. The crews depose their white officers and threaten to bombard Rio de Janeiro.
1911	10 January	The cargo ship 'SS São Luiz runs aground off the coast of Rio Grande do Norte.
1912	October	Beginning of the Contestado War, a dispute between settlers and landowners.
1912	29 December	The federal government sends in 200 federal troops to deal with ongoing trouble in the State of Santa Catarina.
1913	12 December	Roosevelt–Rondon Scientific Expedition: following a speaking tour in Brazil and Argentina, former US President Theodore Roosevelt meets up with Cândido Rondon to embark on a joint exploration of the "River of Doubt".
1914	1 March	In the presidential election, incumbent Vice President Venceslau Brás, of the Minas Gerais Republican Party, receives 91.6% of the vote.
1914	8 June	The Brazilian Football Confederation is founded, with Álvaro Zamith as its first president. The Brazilian Olympic Committee is founded on the same day.
1914	14 September	The British Royal Navy auxiliary cruiser HMS Carmania fought the German SMS Cap Trafalgar off Trindade in the Battle of Trindade. Carmania sank Cap Trafalgar, but sustained severe damage herself.
1915	29 January	Heitor Villa-Lobos gives the first in a series of chamber concerts; one of the new works he introduces during this year is his Cello Concerto no 1.
1916	5 March	The liner Príncipe de Asturias runs aground in fog on the shoals out of Ponta do Boi, in the island of Sao Sebastião, while trying to approach the port of Santos. At least 445 people out of the 588 aboard are killed.
1916	3 May	Brazilian merchant ship Rio Branco is sunk by a German submarine. Because the ship is in restricted waters and registered under the British flag, and most of its crew is Norwegian, it is not considered an illegal attack by the Brazilian government, despite public protests.
1916	August	Brazilian Naval Aviation is established, in preparation for the country's participation in the First World War.
1916		The capture of rebel leader Deodato Manuel Ramos ("Adeodato") marks the effective end of the Contestado War.
1917	5 April	The steamship Paraná, loaded with coffee and travelling in accordance with the demands made on neutral countries, is torpedoed by a German submarine; three Brazilians are killed.
1917	11 April	Brazil breaks off diplomatic relations with Germany.
1917	7 May	Foreign Minister Lauro Müller is obliged to resign because of his German origins.
1917	May–November	Several Brazilian vessels are torpedoed by the Germans.
1917	26 October	World War I: Brazil declares war on the Central Powers.
1917	1 November	A mob damages German property in Petrópolis, including the restaurant Brahma (completely destroyed), the Gesellschaft Germania, the German school, the company Arp, and the German Journal.
1918	30 January	Ministerial Notice No. 501 is issued, establishing the Naval Division for War Operations (Divisão Naval em Operações de Guerra – DNOG).
1918	1 March	Brazilian general election, 1918: former President Rodrigues Alves receives 99.1% of the vote.
1918	18 August	The Brazilian Medical Mission, led by Dr. Nabuco Gouveia and directed by General Aché, is established with 86 doctors.
1918	24 September	The Brazilian Medical Mission lands at Marseille, France, and supports the local population during a flu outbreak, ensuring the continuity of logistical support to the troops at the front.
1918	15 November	President-elect Rodrigues Alves, suffering from influenza, is unable to take office on the scheduled date, and is replaced by Vice President Delfim Moreira.
1919	13 April	In the presidential election brought about by the death of Rodrigues Alves, Epitácio Pessoa of the Paraíba Republican Party receives 71.0% of the vote.
1919	24 April	Ford Brasil, a subsidiary of the Ford Motor Company, is founded.
1919	11–29 May	The 1919 South American Championship football tournament is held in Rio de Janeiro. It is won by the home country.
1919	28 July	Epitácio Pessoa takes office as president, replacing acting President Delfim Moreira, who continues as vice president.
1920	20 April	Opening ceremony of the 1920 Summer Olympics in Antwerp, at which Brazil competes for the first time. Sport shooter Guilherme Paraense is the first Brazilian to win a gold medal.
1921	October	The government implements a new policy in defense of coffee, for the third time in the history of the Republic.
1922	11–18 February	Modern Art Week is held in São Paulo, marking the beginning of Brazilian Modernism.
1922	1 March	In the Brazilian presidential election, Artur Bernardes of the Mineiro Republican Party receives 56.0% of the vote.
1922	5 July	The 18 of the Copacabana Fort revolt occurs in Rio de Janeiro, then Federal District of Brazil. It is the first revolt of the tenentista movement, in the context of the Brazilian Old Republic.
1923	3 May	Brazil sign the Pan-American Treaty.
1923		The Brazilian Society of Chemistry is founded.
1923		Brazil's first radio broadcasting station, the Radio Society of Rio de Janeiro, is founded; it is still working under the name Rádio MEC.
1924	5–28 July	Military revolt in São Paulo.
1925	12 April	The Coluna Prestes movement is launched at a meeting in Foz do Iguaçu.
1925	29 May	British explorer Percy Fawcett sent a last telegram to his wife, before he disappears in the Amazon.
1926	1 March	In the presidential election, Washington Luís of the Republican Party of São Paulo, who received 98.0% of the vote.
1927	11 June	The Brazilian submarine Humaytá is launched at the Odero-Terni-Orlando shipyard at La Spezia, Italy.
1928	10 August	The ETA – Empresa de Transporte Aéreo airline is founded; it remains in operation for only a year.
1928		The Liberator Party (Brazil) is founded for the first time, by members of the Rio Grande do Sul Federalist Party, notably Joaquim Francisco de Assis Brasil.
1929	August	Minas Gerais, Rio Grande do Sul, and Paraíba join the political opposition from several states, including the Democratic Party of São Paulo, to oppose the presidential candidacy of Washington Luís's nominated successor, Júlio Prestes, and form the Liberal Alliance.
1929	20 September	The Liberal Alliance nominates its candidates for the presidential elections: Getúlio Vargas as president and João Pessoa Cavalcanti de Albuquerque as vice president.
1929	29 October	The US stock market crash causes a fall in coffee quotations to 60%.
1930	1 March	A general election is held; in the presidential elections, the result is a victory for Júlio Prestes of the Republican Party of São Paulo, who receives 57.7% of the vote. Vital Soares is elected vice president, but never takes office.
1930	26 July	The assassination of João Pessoa Cavalcânti de Albuquerque, governor of Paraíba, by João Duarte Dantas, stirs up a wave of bad feeling toward the federal government and the outgoing president Washington Luís, who is accused of bearing the "moral responsibility".
1930	13 August	1930 Curuçá River event: the area of Curuçá River near latitude 5° S and longitude 71.5° W experiences a meteoric air burst (also known as the Brazilian Tunguska event).
1930	September	The state capital of Paraíba, formerly Parahyba, is renamed João Pessoa, in memory of its assassinated governor.
1930	3 October	Revolution of 1930.
1930	24 October	Incumbent President Washington Luís is deposed. A military junta, led by General Augusto Tasso Fragoso, temporarily takes control of the country.
1930	1 November	Beginning of the Vargas Era: the ruling junta hands power and the presidential palace to Getúlio Vargas.
1930		The National Institute of Metrology Standardization and Industrial Quality (INMETRO) is founded.
1931	16 September	Frente Negra Brasileira, Brazil's first black political party, is created.
1931	12 October	The statue of Christ the Redeemer, overlooking Rio de Janeiro, is consecrated.
1932	24 February	The Justiça Eleitoral do Brasil is created by Decreto nº 21.076.
1932	24 February	Women win the right to vote.
1932	April	Peter Fleming joins the expedition to find missing Englishman Colonel Percy Fawcett; the following year he publishes an account of the expedition, entitled Brazilian Adventure.
1932	23 May	Four protesting students (Martins, Miragaia, Dráusio and Camargo) are killed by government troops, sparking off the "Paulista War".
1932	June	São Paulo rebels take control of the state.
1932	9 July	Constitutionalist Revolution: the population of the state of São Paulo revolt against the 1930 coup d'état.
1932	2 October	The São Paulo rebels are defeated by government forces.
1932	October	Brazilian Integralism, a Fascist movement, is founded by Plínio Salgado.
1933	10 October	The Anti-war Treaty of Non-aggression and Conciliation, an inter-American treaty, is signed in Rio de Janeiro by representatives of Argentina, Brazil, Chile, Mexico, Paraguay and Uruguay.
1934	16 July	The Vargas government introduces what will be the shortest-lived Constitution of Brazil, lasting only 3 years (until 1937). It is the first time a Brazilian constitution has been written from scratch by directly elected deputies in multi-party elections, and incorporates a number of improvements to Brazilian political, social and economical life.
1934	17 July	In the presidential election, carried out by the Constituent Assembly, acting President Getúlio Vargas receives 175 of the 248 votes.
1934		The University of São Paulo is established.
1934		The Brazilian Institute of Geography and Statistics is founded under the title of the National Institute of Statistics.
1935	November	A Communist insurrection, the "Red Revolt of 35", or the Intentona Comunista, fails to unseat President Vargas. Olga Benário Prestes and her husband Luís Carlos Prestes are among the conspirators arrested.
1936	16 October	President Vargas signed the decree, which gives the name of the aviator Alberto Santos Dumont Airport, located in Ponta do Calabouço, in the city of Rio de Janeiro, named Santos Dumont Airport, Brazil's first civilian airport.
1937	7 May	One of the leaders of the communist revolution, Luis Carlos Prestes, is sentenced to 16 years and eight months in prison.
1937	10 June	National Democratic Union, ahead of support for the candidacy of Armando Sales de Oliveira for president in the 1938 elections is created.
1937	14 June	President Getúlio Vargas signed the decree establishing the Itatiaia National Park, the first national park in Brazil.
1937	13 August	The National Union of Students is founded in Rio de Janeiro.
1937	10 November	The fourth Brazilian Constitution is granted by President Vargas, starting the Estado Novo.
1937	21 December	President Vargas signs the ordinance which extinguishes all political parties in the country.
1938	May	The Brazilian integralist movement attempt a coup d'état, supported by the Axis powers. The failure of the "Pajama Putsch" leads to the dissolution of the AIB.
1938	28 July	Folk hero Lampião and his band are ambushed in one of his hideouts, the Angicos farm, in the state of Sergipe.
1939	30 November	Serra dos Órgãos National Park is created.
1939	5 December	The Imperial Mausoleum is officially inaugurated at the Cathedral of Petrópolis.
1942	28 January	Brazil breaks diplomatic relations with the Axis countries.
1942	July–August	Several Brazilian vessels are torpedoed by the Germans.
1942	22 August	President Getúlio Vargas signs the declaration of war against Germany and Italy.
1942	1 November	The Cruzeiro "antigo" is adopted as the official currency.
1943	11 June	The Order of Military Merit is established by President Getúlio Vargas.
1943	13 July	On the recommendation of the National Petroleum Council, Brazil bans the use of private motorcycles throughout the nation in order to conserve fuel. Use of gasoline-powered automobiles had been prohibited the year before.
1943	31 July	The Brazilian passenger ship and freighter Bagé, largest commercial ship in Brazil's fleet, is torpedoed and sunk off the coast of the Sergipe state. The Bagé, carrying 129 passengers and 102 crew, was en route from Belém to Rio de Janeiro when it was struck by a German U-boat. Seventy-eight people (41 passengers and 37 crew) are lost.
1944	1 January	The former Royal Military Academy expends into the city of Resende.
1944	2 July	Second World War: the first five thousand Brazilian Expeditionary Force soldiers, the 6th RCT, leave Brazil for Europe aboard the USNS General Mann.
1944	September	Brazilian air-land forces go into action in Italy.
1944	13 October	Brazilian pilots begin operations, as individual elements of flights attached to 350th FG squadrons.
1944–1945	25 November 1944 – 21 February 1945	Second World War, Battle of Monte Castello: the battle marks the Brazilian Expeditionary Force's entry into the land war in Europe.
1945	February	A fourth transport of troops of the Brazilian Expeditionary Force reaches Italy, in preparation for the Spring 1945 offensive.
1945	12 May	Brazilian troops arrive in Turin on the same day that the cessation of hostilities is announced.
1945	May	Bishop Carlos Duarte Costa, an outspoken critic of the regime of President Getúlio Vargas and of the Vatican's alleged relationship with fascist regimes, gives newspaper interviews accusing Brazil's Papal nuncio of Nazi-Fascist spying, and accusing Rome of having aided and abetted Hitler. Shortly afterwards he establishes the Brazilian Catholic Apostolic Church.
1945	29 October	President Vargas resigns. José Linhares becomes acting president, beginning the period known as the Fourth Brazilian Republic at the end of his term.
1945	2 December	A general election is held, the first since the establishment of Getúlio Vargas' Estado Novo. The presidential election is won by Eurico Gaspar Dutra of the Social Democratic Party (PSD), which also wins a majority of seats in both the Chamber of Deputies and the Senate.
1946	18 September	A new constitution is introduced, and the position of Vice President of Brazil is recreated; Nereu Ramos is selected as the first incumbent.
1947	19 January	Parliamentary elections are held, for 19 vacant seats in the Chamber of Deputies, one additional Senator for each state (except Santa Catarina, which elected two), and for all state Governors and legislatures. The Brazilian Communist Party wins nearly 10% of the vote in the state elections, becoming the third party in the state of São Paulo (ahead of the UDN) and the single largest party in the federal capital, Rio de Janeiro.
1947	6 August	The Brazilian Socialist Party is founded.
1947	2 October	The São Paulo Museum of Art opens to the public.
1949		The Centro Brasileiro de Pesquisas Físicas is founded by Cesar Lattes, José Leite Lopes, and Jayme Tiomno.
1950	16 June	The Maracanã Stadium opens in Rio de Janeiro.
1950	24 June – 16 July	Brazil hosts the 1950 FIFA World Cup. The local national team is beaten 1–2 by Uruguay in the final game.
1950	18 September	First television broadcasting in Brazil by TV Tupi.
1950	3 October	The Brazilian general election is won by the Social Democratic Party, who remain the largest party in both the Chamber of Deputies and the Senate, although they lose their majority in the former. The presidential election is won by former President Getúlio Vargas of the Brazilian Labour Party.
1951		The Brazilian Medical Association is founded.
1951		The Escola Superior de Propaganda e Marketing is founded in São Paulo.
1952	4 March	Anchieta rail disaster: a crowded steam-powered passenger train derails while crossing a bridge over the Pavuna River near Anchieta station, sending two old wooden carriages broadside onto the adjacent line. A modern high-speed electric freight train, travelling in the opposite direction, ploughs into the wooden carriages, telescoping them upwards. The severity of the accident was compounded by the fact that the suburban train is overloaded, with passengers clinging to the sides, underneath and between the carriages. A witness says they saw "passengers flying in all directions when the crash occurred". 119 people are killed and the resulting outcry prompts major new investment in Brazilian railways.
1952	28 April	Pan Am Flight 202 crashes in the Amazon Basin approximately 220 nautical miles (410 km) southwest of Carolina, Brazil. All 50 people on board are killed in the worst-ever accident involving the Boeing 377.
1952	12 August	1952 Transportes Aéreos Nacional Douglas C-47 mid-air explosion: a Douglas C-47A registered PP-ANH is destroyed after an in-flight fire causes it to crash near Palmeiras de Goiás. All 24 people on board are killed.
1952		Bob's, Brazil's first fast food chain, opens in Rio de Janeiro.
1954	24 August	Brazilian President Getúlio Vargas commits suicide after being accused of involvement in a conspiracy to murder his chief political opponent, Carlos Lacerda.
1954	3 October	Brazilian legislative election, 1954
1955	3 October	The presidential election results in victory for Juscelino Kubitschek, who receives 35.7% of the vote.
1955	3 November	Café Filho is forced to give up the presidency of Brazil on health grounds. Kubitschek does not take office until the following year.
1955		The Museum of Modern Art, Rio de Janeiro, is completed, a Modernist concrete museum building, designed by Affonso Eduardo Reidy, with gardens designed by Burle Marx.
1956	31 January	Juscelino Kubitschek is inaugurated as the 21st President of Brazil.
1957	October	The Africanized bee is accidentally released in Brazil.
1957	16 October	Antônio Vilas Boas, a Brazilian farmer, claims to have been abducted by extraterrestrials; the first famous alien abduction case.
1958	29 June	Brazil beats Sweden 5–2 in the final game to win the football World Cup in Sweden.
1960	21 April	The country's capital (Federal District) is relocated from the city of Rio de Janeiro to the new city, Brasília, in the highlands. The actual city of Rio de Janeiro becomes the State of Guanabara.
1960	3 October	Jânio Quadros is elected President of Brazil for a five-year term.
1961	25 August	João Goulart replaces Jânio Quadros as President of Brazil
1961	17 December	A circus tent fire in Niterói, Brazil, kills 323.
1962	17 June	Brazil beats Czechoslovakia 3–1 to win the 1962 FIFA World Cup.
1962		The first official group of Korean immigrants to Brazil. There has been a large flow of documented Korean migrants to Brazil.
1964	31 March	The military overthrows Brazilian President João Goulart in a coup, starting 21 years of dictatorship in Brazil.
1964	1 April	Deployed military rule in Brazil ended the then government of President João Goulart.
1964	11 April	Brazilian presidential election, 1964: the Brazilian Congress elects Field Marshal Humberto de Alencar Castelo Branco as President of Brazil.
1965	26 April	Rede Globo, the 3rd largest TV broadcaster of the world, is founded, in Rio de Janeiro, Brazil.
1965	27 October	Brazilian President Humberto de Alencar Castelo Branco removes power from parliament, legal courts and opposition parties.
1966	5 March	A massive theft of nuclear materials is revealed in Brazil.
1967	24 January	New constitution is promulgated.
1967	1 March	Brazilian police arrest Franz Stangl, ex-commander of Treblinka and Sobibór extermination camps.
1967	15 March	The Republic of the United States of Brazil is renamed the Federative Republic of Brazil.
1968	28 March	Brazilian high school student Edson Luís de Lima Souto is shot by the police in a protest for cheaper meals at a restaurant for low-income students. The aftermath of his death is one of the first major events against the military dictatorship.
1968	13 December	Faced with growing discontent and the proliferation of actions by groups considered subversive, Brazilian President Artur da Costa e Silva enacts the Institutional Act Number Five "AI-5". AI-5 grants broad powers to the government, allowing the suspension of constitutional guarantees, the closure of the National Congress, and censorship of the press, beginning the most repressive period of the 21-year Brazilian Military Dictatorship.
1969	31 August – 30 October	Brazilian Military Junta of 1969 rules the country following sudden illness and resignation of President da Costa e Silva. The junta consists of Army General Aurélio de Lyra Tavares, Navy Admiral Augusto Hamann Rademaker Grunewald and Air Force Brigadier Márcio de Souza e Mello.
1969	19 November	Playing for Santos against Vasco in Rio de Janeiro, Brazilian footballer Pelé scored his 1,000th goal.
1970	11 March	Japanese consul-general in São Paulo Nobuo Okuchi is kidnapped by the leftist guerrilla group Vanguarda Popular Revolucionária.
1970	15 March	Japanese consul-general in São Paulo Nobuo Okuchi is ransomed by the Brazilian government, he is released in exchange for five political prisoners.
1970	11 June	West German ambassador Ehrenfried von Holleben is kidnapped by the Vanguarda Popular Revolucionária and by the Ação Libertadora Nacional.
1970	21 June	Brazil defeats Italy 4–1 to win the 1970 FIFA World Cup in Mexico.
1970	1 December	Giovanni Enrico Bucher, the Swiss ambassador to Brazil, is kidnapped by the Ação Libertadora Nacional in Rio de Janeiro; kidnappers demand the release of 70 political prisoners.
1971	14 January	Seventy Brazilian political prisoners are released in Santiago, Chile; Giovanni Enrico Bucher is released 16 January.
1971	16 January	Giovanni Enrico Bucher is released by the Ação Libertadora Nacional.
1971	20 November	A bridge still in construction, called "Elevado Engenheiro Freyssinet", falls over the Paulo de Frontin Avenue, in Rio de Janeiro; 48 people are killed and several injured. Reconstructed, the bridge is a part of the Linha Vermelha elevate.
1974	1 February	Fire breaks out in the Joelma Building in São Paulo, Brazil; 177 die and 293 are injured; 11 die later of their injuries.
1974	4 March	The Rio–Niterói Bridge opens.
1975	15 March	Guanabara State merges into the state of Rio de Janeiro. The state's capital moves from the city of Niterói to the city of Rio de Janeiro.
1977		President Geisel closed Congress briefly to control presidential succession as conflict erupted between Geisel, the duristas, Congress, the Church, and the media.
1977–1978		Operação Prato.
1979	7 February	Nazi criminal Josef Mengele suffers a stroke and drowns while swimming in Bertioga, Brazil. His remains are found in 1985.
1980	1 June	Mauro Milhomem, a pilot, attempted to crash his Sertanejo-721 into the Hotel Presidente owned by his mother-in-law, after he had an argument with his wife the previous day after he discovered that she cheated him. The plane failed to hit the target and hit into several objects and ultimately crashed into an accounting office in front to a forum. Six people were killed and four were wounded.
1980	9 July	Pope John Paul II visits Brazil; 7 people are crushed to death in a crowd meeting him.
1981	20 September	The Brazilian river boat Sobral Santos capsizes in the Amazon River, Óbidos, Brazil, killing at least 300.
1983	19 December	The Jules Rimet Trophy is stolen from the Brazilian Soccer Confederation building in Rio de Janeiro.
1984	16 April	More than one million people, led by Tancredo Neves, occupy the streets of São Paulo to demand direct presidential elections during the Brazilian military government of João Figueiredo. It is the largest protest during the Diretas Já civil unrest, as well as the largest public demonstration in the history of Brazil. The elections are granted in 1989.
1984	May	The Itaipu Dam is inaugurated on the border of Brazil and Paraguay after 9 years of construction, making it the largest hydroelectric dam in the world at the time.
1985	15 January	Tancredo Neves is elected President of Brazil by the Congress, ending the 21-year military rule.
1985	15 March	Vice President José Sarney, upon becoming vice president, assumes the duties of President of Brazil, as the new President Tancredo Neves had become severely ill, the day before. Sarney will become Brazil's first civilian President in 21 years, upon Neves' death on 21 April.
1985	21 April	Brazilian President Tancredo Neves dies, he is succeeded by Vice President José Sarney. The vice president post is left vacant until 1990.
1985	6 June	The remains of Josef Mengele, the physician notorious for Nazi human experimentation on inmates of Auschwitz concentration camp, buried in 1979 under the name of Wolfgang Gerhard, are exhumed in Embu das Artes, Brazil.
1987	13 September	Goiânia accident: a radioactive object is stolen from an abandoned hospital in Goiânia, Brazil, contaminating many people in the following weeks and causing some to die from radiation poisoning.
1988	25 June	PSDB is founded by members of the Brazilian Democratic Movement Party linked to the European social democratic movement as an attempt to clarify their ideals.
1988	5 October	Brazil adopts a new constitution.
1988	22 December	Brazilian union and environmental activist Chico Mendes is assassinated.
1988	31 December	The Bateau Mouche cruise ship capsized and sank in the South Atlantic off Rio de Janeiro with the loss of at least 51 of the 149 people on board.
1989	12 November	Brazil holds its first free presidential election since 1960. This marks the first time that all Ibero-American nations, excepting Cuba, have elected constitutional governments simultaneously.
1989	15 November	Brazil holds the first round of its first free election in 29 years; Fernando Collor de Mello and Luiz Inácio Lula da Silva advance to the second round, to be held the following month.
1989	17 December	Brazil holds the second round of its first free election in 29 years; Fernando Collor de Mello is elected to serve as president from 1990.
1990	15 March	Fernando Collor de Mello takes office as President of Brazil, Brazil's first democratically elected president since Jânio Quadros in 1961. The next day, he announces a currency freeze and freezes large bank accounts for 18 months.
1991	26 March	Argentina, Brazil, Uruguay and Paraguay sign the Treaty of Asunción, establishing the South Common Market (Mercosur is its acronym in Spanish).
1991	30 September	A tornado destroys parts of Itu, a city in southeastern Brazil, killing 16 and leaving 176 injured.
1992	8 June	The first World Oceans Day is celebrated, coinciding with the Earth Summit held in Rio de Janeiro, Brazil.
1992	24 August	A special commission in Brazil concludes that there is sufficient evidence to begin impeachment proceedings against President of Brazil Fernando Collor de Mello, finding he had accepted millions of dollars' worth of illegal payments from business interests.
1992	29 September	The Chamber of Deputies of Brazil votes to impeach President of Brazil Fernando Collor de Mello, the country's first democratically elected leader in 29 years. Vice President Itamar Franco becomes acting president.
1992	2 October	A riot breaks out in the Carandiru Penitentiary in São Paulo, Brazil, resulting in the Carandiru massacre.
1992	29 December	Brazil's President Fernando Collor de Mello is found guilty on charges that he stole more than $32 million from the government, preventing him from holding any elected office for 8 years.
1993	21 April	A constitutional referendum is held to determine the form of government of the country.
1993	23 July	Candelária massacre: Brazilian police officers kill eight street kids in Rio de Janeiro.
1993	29 August	Vigário Geral massacre.
1993	16 December	Brazil's Supreme Court rules that former President Fernando Collor de Mello may not hold elected office again until 2000 due to political corruption.
1994	1 May	Brazilian Three time Formula One World Champion, Ayrton Senna is killed in a crash during the 1994 San Marino Grand Prix.
1994	1 July	Brazil introduces its new currency, the Real.
1994	17 July	Brazil wins the 1994 FIFA World Cup, defeating Italy by 3–2 in penalties (full-time 0–0).
1995	1 January	Fernando Henrique Cardoso becomes President of Brazil.
1996	20 January	Varginha UFO incident in Minas Gerais.
1996	2 March	A Learjet 25 (registration PT-LSD) carrying the Brazilian satirical rock band Mamonas Assassinas attempts a go-around at São Paulo–Guarulhos International Airport in São Paulo, Brazil, but crashes in the Serra da Cantareira mountain range, killing all eight people on board including all five members of the band.
1996	17 April	Eldorado dos Carajás massacre.
1999	6 June	In São José dos Campos, 345 prisoners escape from Putim prison through the front gate.

== 21st century ==
Year	Date	Event
2001	10 September	Antônio da Costa Santos, mayor of Campinas, is assassinated.
2001	11 September	Three Brazilians are killed in the September 11 attacks in the United States.
2002	30 June	Brazil wins its 5th FIFA World Cup title by defeating Germany 2–0 in the 2002 FIFA World Cup final.
2002	27 October	Luiz Inácio Lula da Silva wins the 2002 Brazilian general election with 52.7 million votes (61.3% of the total).
2003	1 January	Luiz Inácio Lula da Silva is inaugurated as president of Brazil.
2003	30 January	The Fome Zero program is introduced by president Luiz Inácio Lula da Silva.
2003	19 August	A car-bomb attack on United Nations headquarters in Iraq kills the agency's top envoy Sérgio Vieira de Mello and 21 other employees.
2004	28 March	The first ever reported South Atlantic hurricane makes landfall in southern Brazil in the state of Santa Catarina – the hurricane is dubbed Hurricane Catarina.
2004	1 June	The United Nations Stabilization Mission in Haiti (MINUSTAH) is established, its military component is led by Brazil.
2005	6 June	Mensalão scandal threatens to bring down the government of Luiz Inácio Lula da Silva.
2005	6 August	Banco Central burglary at Fortaleza
2005	23 October	2005 Brazilian firearms and ammunition referendum
2006	30 March	Marcos Pontes becomes the first Brazilian and the first native Portuguese-speaking person to go into space, where he stays on the International Space Station for a week. During his trip, Pontes carries out eight experiments selected by the Brazilian Space Agency. He lands in Kazakhstan on 8 April 2006, with the crew of Expedition 12.
2006	May	May 2006 São Paulo violence.
2006	July	July 2006 São Paulo violence
2006	7 August	Lei Maria da Penha is sanctioned by president Luiz Inácio Lula da Silva.
2006	29 September	Gol Transportes Aéreos Flight 1907 leads to the 2006–2007 Brazilian aviation crisis.
2006	29 October	Luiz Inácio Lula da Silva is re-elected as president.
2007	18 March	Cesare Battisti, convicted in absentia of two murders in Italy in the 1970s and who later became a crime writer in France, is arrested in Brazil.
2007	May	Pope Benedict XVI visits Brazil to reaffirm Catholicism in the country.
2007	11 May	Pope Benedict XVI canonizes Brazil's first native-born saint, Frei Galvão, an 18th-century Franciscan friar.
2007	26 June	Bolivia reclaims two oil refineries from Brazilian state-owned energy company Petrobras.
2007	27 June	Complexo do Alemão massacre.
2007	7 July	The New 7 Wonders of the World are announced. These are The Great Wall of China, Petra in Jordan, the Christ the Redeemer statue in Brazil, Machu Picchu in Peru, Mexico's Chichen Itza Mayan site, the Colosseum in Rome and the Taj Mahal in India.
2007	13–19 July	The Fifteenth Pan American Games take place in Rio de Janeiro.
2007	17 July	TAM Linhas Aéreas Flight 3054 carrying 186 people crashes in Congonhas International Airport, São Paulo, Brazil. The death toll is estimated to be at least 200 people.
2007	4 November	At least six people are killed as a Learjet 35 crashes into a residential district in São Paulo, Brazil.
2007	25 November	At least eight football fans die when part of the Fonte Nova stadium in Salvador, Bahia, collapses.
2007	2 December	Brazil starts free-to-air digital television transmissions in São Paulo, but broadcasting companies must transmit signals in both analogue and digital formats until June 2016.
2007	20 December	The Portrait of Suzanne Bloch (1904), by the Spanish artist Pablo Picasso, and O Lavrador de Café by Brazilian modernist painter Candido Portinari, are stolen from the São Paulo Museum of Art.
2007	17 December	The leaders of Brazil, Bolivia, and Chile agree to build a highway by 2009 that will link the Atlantic (in Santos, São Paulo, Brazil) and the Pacific (in Iquique, Chile) coasts of South America.
2008	9 January	The police recovered the Portrait of Suzanne Bloch (1904), by the Spanish artist Pablo Picasso, and O Lavrador de Café by Brazilian modernist painter Cândido Portinari, which had been stolen in December 2007.
2008	24 November	The 2008 Santa Catarina floods in Santa Catarina, Brazil, kill 126 and force the evacuation of over 78,000 people.
2009	1 June	Air France Flight 447, en route from Rio de Janeiro, to Paris, crashes into the Atlantic Ocean, killing all 228 on board.
2009	2 October	The International Olympic Committee awards the 2016 Summer Olympics to Rio de Janeiro.
2009	16 October	Brasil de Pelotas bus crash: two players and a coach die.
2010	January	January 2010 Rio de Janeiro floods and mudslides
2010	17 February	Sinking of the Concordia.
2010	April	April 2010 Rio de Janeiro floods and mudslides
2010	June	2010 Northeastern Brazil floods.
2010	21–28 November	2010 Rio de Janeiro security crisis
2011	1 January	Inauguration of Dilma Rousseff as the 36th President of Brazil.
2011	11 January	January 2011 Rio de Janeiro floods and mudslides: over 900 people are killed as a result of freak weather conditions.
2011	7 April	Rio de Janeiro school shooting: 12 children aged between 12 and 14 are killed and 12 others seriously wounded after an armed man opens fire at an elementary school in Realengo
2011	13 July	Noar Linhas Aéreas Flight 4896: a Noar Linhas Aéreas Let L-410 Turbolet crashes in Boa Viagem, Recife, killing all 16 people on board.
2011	7 November	Campos Basin oil spill: a Chevron-owned oil well began leaking causing 32,000 to 52,000 litres (200 to 330 bbl) of crude oil to enter the ocean every day. The leak took place in Campos Basin, Brazil 120 kilometres (75 mi) off the coast of Rio de Janeiro.
2012	13 February	Lindemberg Alves begins to be tried for the death of ex-girlfriend Elóa Pimentel, in the city of Santo André.
2013	27 January	A nightclub fire in Santa Maria, Rio Grande do Sul kills at least 242 people.
2013	April – July	2013 protests in Brazil.
2013	23 July	World Youth Day began in Rio de Janeiro.
2014	17 March	Operation Car Wash begins.
2014	May – July	2014 protests in Brazil.
2014	12 June – 13 July	The 2014 FIFA World Cup is held in Brazil, and is won by Germany.
2014	3 July	Belo Horizonte overpass collapse
2014	13 August	Governor Eduardo Campos, a candidate in the upcoming Brazilian presidential election, dies in a plane crash in Santos, São Paulo, together with six other people on board the aircraft. It also sparks a large fire.
2014	13 August	2014 Cessna Citation 560 XLS+ crash
2014	October	Brazilian general election, 2014, with reelection of Dilma Rousseff.
2014	10 December	26-year-old Sailson José das Graças is arrested for the serial murder as many as 41 people in a string of suspected racist hate crimes.
2015	6 January	Two commuter trains collide at Mesquita, Rio de Janeiro, injuring 158 people.
2015	15 March	Hundreds of thousands of people in Brazil protest against corruption and denounce the government of President Dilma Rousseff.
2015	5 November	An iron ore tailings dam in Bento Rodrigues, a subdistrict of Mariana, Brazil, suffered a catastrophic failure, causing flooding, killing 17 and injuring 16.
2016	13 March	Hundreds of thousands of people all over Brazil protest against corruption and denounce the government of President Dilma Rousseff.
2016	9 June	A bus plunges over a ravine in Brazil's São Paulo state, resulting in at least 18 people killed and 28 injured.
2016	5–21 August	The 2016 Summer Olympics are held in Rio de Janeiro.
2016	31 August	The Senate votes 61–20 in favor of removing Dilma Rousseff from office as President of Brazil. Acting President Michel Temer will serve out the remainder of the term, which ends 1 January 2019.
2016	15 October	A wildlife sanctuary for rescued elephants opens in Mato Grosso.
2016	17 October	Clashes between rival gangs in at least two prisons, leave at least 18 people killed.
2016	29 November	A chartered Avro RJ85 plane carrying 77 people, including the Chapecoense football team, crashes near Medellín, Colombia. Rescuers report at least six survivors have been found in the wreckage. The 2016 Copa Sudamericana Finals are suspended. The title is later awarded to Chapecoense.
2017	2 January	At least 56 people are killed in rebellion at Anisio Jobim penitentiary complex in Amazonas state.
2017	6 January	Members of the Primeiro Comando da Capital prison gang kill 31 inmates in the Monte Cristo prison in the state of Roraima. This action was revenge for an earlier massacre in a prison in Amazonas that killed 56 inmates.
2017	6 February	A police strike leads to a wave of violence and looting in Espírito Santo, including dozens of murders in the state capital, Vitória.
2017	17 March	Operation Carne Fraca starts.
2017	28 April	A general strike is held in the country, the first one in twenty years.
2018	8 April	Former President Luiz Inácio Lula da Silva begins serving a 12-year sentence for corruption.
2018	1 May	Edifício Wilton Paes de Almeida, a 26-story tower block in São Paulo, Brazil, is destroyed by a fire and consequent collapse. Neighbouring buildings are also damaged by fire.
2018	2 September	A massive fire destroys most of the Paço de São Cristóvão, which houses the National Museum of Brazil, in Rio de Janeiro. The museum holds important archaeological and anthropological objects, including the remains of the Luzia Woman, Marajoara vases and Egyptian mummies.
2018	6 September	Presidential candidate Jair Bolsonaro is stabbed while campaigning in the city of Juiz de Fora, Minas Gerais.
2018	28 October	Brazilians elect Jair Bolsonaro of the Social Liberal Party as president, with 55% of the votes, in the second round of the presidential election.
2019	1 January	Inauguration of Jair Bolsonaro as the 38th President of Brazil.
2019	25 January	The Brumadinho dam disaster, when a mining dam owned by Vale, collapses in Minas Gerais, leaving 203 dead and one hundred and five individuals missing.
2019	8 February	A fire on Flamengo youth academy training camp leaves ten people dead and three injured in Rio de Janeiro
2019	13 March	Two men, of 17 and 25 years old, attack a school in the city of Suzano, São Paulo, with a revolver and a knife, killing eight and wounding 23 people, among students and staff. The two shooters committed suicide after the attack. Police have found a crossbow, Molotov cocktails and a "suitcase with wires" at the scene.
2019	August - September	A great fire destroys part of the Amazon Rain Forest, including Brazilian portion, leading to international commotion for the sake of Amazonia.
2021	17 January	The first vaccine against COVID-19 is applied in the country.
2022	30 October	Brazilians elect Luiz Inácio Lula da Silva of the Workers' Party as president, with 50.9% of the vote, in the second round of the presidential election, thereby making him the first person to defeat an incumbent running for a second term, the first person to run for a third non-consecutive term, and the oldest person to assume the office of president, at the age of 77.
2023	8 January	2023 invasion of the Brazilian Congress.
2024	12 August	Voepass Flight 2283, the twin-engine turboprop passenger aircraft, crashed near São Paulo, killing all 62 people on board. Officials are investigating the cause.

== See also ==
- Timeline of Amazon history
- Timeline of LGBTQ history in Brazil
- Timelines of cities in Brazil

== Bibliography ==
in English

- George Henry Townsend (1867), "Brazil", A Manual of Dates (2nd ed.), London: Frederick Warne & Co.
- William Henry Overall, ed. (1870). "Brazil". Dictionary of Chronology. London: William Tegg. hdl:2027/uc2.ark:/13960/t9m32q949.
- Vincent, Benjamin (1910), "Brazil", Haydn's Dictionary of Dates (25th ed.), London: Ward, Lock & Co.
- José Maria Bello; James L. Taylor (1966). "Brief Chronology of Brazilian History". A History of Modern Brazil, 1889-1964. Stanford University Press. ISBN 978-0-8047-0238-6.
- E. Bradford Burns (1993). "Chronology of Significant Dates in Brazilian History". A History of Brazil. Columbia University Press. ISBN 978-0-231-07954-9.
- Robert M. Levine (2003). "Timeline of Historical Events". History of Brazil. Palgrave Macmillan. ISBN 978-1-4039-6255-3.
- Europa Publications (2003). "Brazil". Political Chronology of the Americas. Routledge. p. 32+. ISBN 978-1-135-35653-8.
- Smith, Joseph (2013). "Chronology of Main Events". A History of Brazil. Routledge. ISBN 978-1-317-89021-8.

in Portuguese

- Joaquim Pedro de Oliveira Martins, "Brazil (1525-1870)", Taboas de chronologia e geographia historica (in Portuguese), Lisbon: Antonio Maria Pereira, pp. 431–432, OCLC 804367357. 1885?
