= 2010 Rio de Janeiro floods =

2010 Rio de Janeiro floods may refer to:

- January 2010 Rio de Janeiro floods and mudslides, an extreme weather event in the State of Rio de Janeiro in January 2010.
- April 2010 Rio de Janeiro floods and mudslides, an extreme weather event in the State of Rio de Janeiro in April 2010.
