= March 11 =

March 11 this year in various calendars
- Wednesday, 11 March 2026
Akan	Monowukuo
Armenian	24 Areg 1475
Aztec	Tecuilhuitontli 20, 9 Tōchtli
Babylonian	21 Shabatu, 2336 SE
Balinese pawukon	Menga, Kajeng, Menala, Paing, Maulu, Buda of Wayang, Uma, Gigis, Manusa
Bengali	26 Falgun, BS 1432
Chinese	Yang Wood Monkey・Winnowing Basket Mansion; Fire Horse Year, Month 1, Day 23 (Jingzhe, 9 days until Chunfen)
Common Era	11 March 2026 CE
Coptic	2 Paremhat, AM 1742
Egyptian	29 Epiphi, 2774 NE
Ethiopian	2 Magābit, 2018 Amätä Məhrät
French Republican	Décade III, Primidi de Ventôse de l'Année 234 de la République
Gregorian	11 March, AD 2026
Hebrew	22 Adar, AM 5786
Hindu	Jyeṣṭhā・Vajra; Solar: 27 Phālguna, 1947 SE; Lunisolar: Aṣṭamī, Kṛishna pakṣa of Phālguna, 2082 VE; Rāudra・5126 KY・1,872,645
Icelandic	Miðvikudagur, 18 Góa 2025
Islamic	22 Ramadan, AH 1447 (using tabular method)
ISO week date	2026-W11-3
Japanese	23 Mutsuki, Reiwa 8 (Keichitsu, 9 days until Shunbun)
Julian	26 February, AD 2026 (AM 7534)
Julian day	2461111
Korean	23 Horangidal, 4359 DE
Maya	13.0.13.7.8; 6 Cumku, 9 Lamat
Roman	ante diem IV Kalendas Martias, MMDCCLXXIX AUC
Solar Hijri	20 Esfand, SH 1404
Tibetan	23 mchu, me pho rta 2153 or 1772 or 1000

<<	March					>>
Su	Mo	Tu	We	Th	Fr	Sa
1	2	3	4	5	6	7
8	9	10	11	12	13	14
15	16	17	18	19	20	21
22	23	24	25	26	27	28
29	30	31
2026

March 11 in recent years
2026 (Wednesday)
2025 (Tuesday)
2024 (Monday)
2023 (Saturday)
2022 (Friday)
2021 (Thursday)
2020 (Wednesday)
2019 (Monday)
2018 (Sunday)
2017 (Saturday)

March 11 is the 70th day of the year (71st in leap years) in the Gregorian calendar; 295 days remain until the end of the year.

== Events ==
=== Pre-1600 ===
- 843 – Triumph of Orthodoxy: Empress Theodora II restores the veneration of icons in the Orthodox churches in the Byzantine Empire.
- 1343 – Arnošt of Pardubice becomes the last Bishop of Prague (3 March 1343 O.S.), and, a year later, the first Archbishop of Prague.
- 1387 – Battle of Castagnaro: Padua, led by John Hawkwood, is victorious over Giovanni Ordelaffi of Verona.

=== 1601–1900 ===
- 1641 – Guaraní forces living in the Jesuit reductions defeat bandeirantes loyal to the Portuguese Empire at the Battle of Mbororé in present-day Panambí, Argentina.
- 1649 – The Frondeurs and the French government sign the Peace of Rueil.
- 1702 – The Daily Courant, England's first national daily newspaper, is published for the first time.
- 1708 – Queen Anne withholds Royal Assent from the Scottish Militia Bill, the last time a British monarch vetoes legislation.
- 1784 – The signing of the Treaty of Mangalore brings the Second Anglo-Mysore War to an end.
- 1795 – The Battle of Kharda is fought between the Maratha Confederacy and the Nizam of Hyderabad, resulting in Maratha victory.
- 1845 – Flagstaff War: Unhappy with translational differences regarding the Treaty of Waitangi, chiefs Hōne Heke, Kawiti and Māori tribe members chop down the British flagpole for a fourth time and drive settlers out of Kororāreka, New Zealand.
- 1848 – Louis-Hippolyte Lafontaine and Robert Baldwin become the first Prime Ministers of the Province of Canada to be democratically elected under a system of responsible government.
- 1851 – The first performance of Rigoletto by Giuseppe Verdi takes place in Venice.
- 1861 – American Civil War: The Constitution of the Confederate States of America is adopted.
- 1864 – The Great Sheffield Flood kills 238 people in Sheffield, England.
- 1872 – Construction of the Seven Sisters Colliery, South Wales, begins; it is located on one of the richest coal sources in Britain.
- 1879 – Shō Tai formally abdicates his position of King of Ryūkyū, under orders from Tokyo, ending the Ryukyu Kingdom.
- 1888 – The Great Blizzard of 1888 begins along the eastern seaboard of the United States, shutting down commerce and killing more than 400 people.
- 1892 – The Saint-Germain bombing ushers France into the Ère des attentats (1892-1894).

=== 1901–present ===
- 1917 – World War I: Mesopotamian campaign: Baghdad falls to Anglo-Indian forces commanded by General Frederick Stanley Maude.
- 1927 – In New York City, Samuel Roxy Rothafel opens the Roxy Theatre.
- 1941 – World War II: United States President Franklin D. Roosevelt signs the Lend-Lease Act into law, allowing American-built war supplies to be shipped to the Allies on loan.
- 1945 – World War II: The Imperial Japanese Navy attempts a large-scale kamikaze attack on the U.S. Pacific Fleet anchored at Ulithi atoll in Operation Tan No. 2.
- 1945 – World War II: The Empire of Vietnam, a short-lived Japanese puppet state, is established.
- 1946 – Rudolf Höss, the first commandant of Auschwitz concentration camp, is captured by British troops.
- 1977 – The 1977 Hanafi Siege: Around 150 hostages held in Washington, D.C., by Hanafi Muslims are set free after ambassadors from three Islamic nations join negotiations.
- 1978 – Coastal Road massacre: At least 37 are killed and more than 70 are wounded when Fatah hijack an Israeli bus, prompting Israel's Operation Litani.
- 1981 – Hundreds of students protest in the University of Pristina in Kosovo, then part of Yugoslavia, to give their province more political rights. The protests then became a nationwide movement.
- 1982 – Fifteen people are killed when Widerøe Flight 933 crashes into the Barents Sea near Gamvik, Norway.
- 1983 – Bob Hawke is appointed Prime Minister of Australia.
- 1985 – Mikhail Gorbachev is elected to the position of General Secretary of the Communist Party of the Soviet Union, making Gorbachev the USSR's de facto, and last, head of state.
- 1990 – Lithuania declares independence from the Soviet Union.
- 1990 – Patricio Aylwin is sworn in as the first democratically elected President of Chile since 1970.
- 2003 – The International Criminal Court holds its inaugural session in The Hague.
- 2004 – Madrid train bombings: Simultaneous explosions on rush hour trains in Madrid, Spain kill 191 people.
- 2006 – Michelle Bachelet is inaugurated as the first female president of Chile.
- 2008 – Space Shuttle Endeavour launches on STS-123, carrying the first component of the Japanese Kibō module to the International Space Station.
- 2009 – Winnenden school shooting: Fifteen are killed and nine are injured before recent graduate Tim Kretschmer shoots and kills himself, leading to tightened weapons restrictions in Germany.
- 2010 – Economist and businessman Sebastián Piñera is sworn in as President of Chile. Aftershocks of the 2010 Pichilemu earthquakes hit central Chile during the ceremony.
- 2011 – An earthquake measuring 9.0 in magnitude strikes 130 km (81 mi) east of Sendai, Japan, triggering a tsunami killing thousands of people. This event also triggered the second largest nuclear accident in history, and one of only two events to be classified as a Level 7 on the International Nuclear Event Scale.
- 2012 – A U.S. soldier kills 16 civilians in the Panjwayi District of Afghanistan near Kandahar.
- 2018 – A Bombardier Challenger 604 crashes into the Zagros Mountains near the Iranian city of Shar-e-kord, killing all 11 people on board.
- 2020 – The World Health Organization (WHO) declares the COVID-19 virus epidemic a pandemic.
- 2021 – US President Joe Biden signs the $1.9 trillion American Rescue Plan into law.
- 2023 – The Burmese military kills at least 30 villagers, including 3 Buddhist monks, during the Pinlaung massacre in Shan State, Myanmar.

== Births ==
=== Pre-1600 ===
- 1278 – Mary of Woodstock, daughter of Edward I of England (died c. 1332)
- 1544 – Torquato Tasso, Italian poet and educator (died 1595)

=== 1601–1900 ===
- 1738 – Benjamin Tupper, American general (died 1792)
- 1785 – John McLean, American jurist and politician (died 1861)
- 1806 – Louis Boulanger, French Romantic painter, lithographer and illustrator (died 1867)
- 1811 – Urbain Le Verrier, French mathematician and astronomer (died 1877)
- 1815 – Anna Bochkoltz, German operatic soprano, voice teacher and composer (died 1879)
- 1818 – Marius Petipa, French-Russian dancer and choreographer (died 1910)
- 1819 – Henry Tate, English businessman and philanthropist, founded Tate & Lyle (died 1899)
- 1822 – Joseph Louis François Bertrand, French mathematician, economist, and academic (died 1900)
- 1863 – Andrew Stoddart, English cricketer and rugby player (died 1915)
- 1870 – Louis Bachelier, French mathematician and theorist (died 1946)
- 1876 – Carl Ruggles, American composer and painter (died 1971)
- 1880 – Harry H. Laughlin, American eugenicist and sociologist (died 1943)
- 1884 – Lewi Pethrus, Swedish minister and hymn-writer (died 1974)
- 1885 – Malcolm Campbell, English race car driver (died 1948)
- 1887 – Raoul Walsh, American actor and director (died 1980)
- 1890 – Vannevar Bush, American engineer and academic (died 1974)
- 1893 – Wanda Gág, American author and illustrator (died 1946)
- 1897 – Henry Cowell, American pianist and composer (died 1965)
- 1898 – Dorothy Gish, American actress (died 1968)
- 1899 – Frederik IX of Denmark (died 1972)
- 1899 – James H. Douglas, Jr., American lawyer, and politician, United States Deputy Secretary of Defense (died 1988)

=== 1901–present ===
- 1903 – Ronald Syme, New Zealand historian and scholar (died 1989)
- 1903 – Lawrence Welk, American accordion player and bandleader (died 1992)
- 1907 – Jessie Matthews, English actress, singer, and dancer (died 1981)
- 1908 – Matti Sippala, Finnish javelin thrower (died 1997)
- 1910 – Robert Havemann, German chemist and academic (died 1982)
- 1911 – Sir Fitzroy Maclean, 1st Baronet, Scottish general and politician (died 1996)
- 1913 – Wolf-Dietrich Wilcke, German colonel and pilot (died 1944)
- 1915 – Vijay Hazare, Indian cricketer (died 2004)
- 1915 – J. C. R. Licklider, American computer scientist and psychologist (died 1990)
- 1915 – Dude Martin, American country singer, bandleader, radio and television host (died 1991)
- 1916 – Harold Wilson, English academic and politician, Prime Minister of the United Kingdom (died 1995)
- 1920 – Nicolaas Bloembergen, Dutch-American physicist and academic, Nobel Prize laureate (died 2017)
- 1921 – Astor Piazzolla, Argentine tango composer and bandoneon player (died 1992)
- 1922 – Cornelius Castoriadis, Greek economist and philosopher (died 1997)
- 1922 – Abdul Razak Hussein, Malaysian lawyer and politician, Prime Minister of Malaysia (died 1976)
- 1922 – José Luis López Vázquez, Spanish actor, costume designer, scenic designer and assistant director (died 2009)
- 1923 – Louise Brough, American tennis player (died 2014)
- 1925 – Margaret Oakley Dayhoff, American biochemist and academic (died 1983)
- 1926 – Ralph Abernathy, American minister and activist (died 1990)
- 1927 – Vince Boryla, American basketball player, coach, and executive (died 2016)
- 1927 – Freda Meissner-Blau, Austrian activist and politician (died 2015)
- 1927 – Robert Mosbacher, American businessman, and politician, United States Secretary of Commerce (died 2010)
- 1927 – Josep Maria Subirachs, Spanish sculptor and painter (died 2014)
- 1929 – Timothy Carey, American actor, director, producer, and screenwriter (died 1994)
- 1929 – Jackie McGlew, South African cricketer (died 1998)
- 1930 – David Gentleman, English illustrator and engraver
- 1930 – Claude Jutra, Canadian actor, director and screenwriter (died 1986)
- 1931 – Rupert Murdoch, Australian-American businessman and media magnate
- 1932 – Leroy Jenkins, American violinist and composer (died 2007)
- 1932 – Nigel Lawson, English journalist and politician, Chancellor of the Exchequer (died 2023)
- 1934 – Sam Donaldson, American journalist
- 1936 – Antonin Scalia, American lawyer and jurist, Associate Justice of the Supreme Court of the United States (died 2016)
- 1940 – Alberto Cortez, Argentinian-Spanish singer-songwriter (died 2019)
- 1941 – Shelly Zegart, quilt historian (died 2025)
- 1943 – Arturo Merzario, Italian race car driver
- 1945 – Dock Ellis, American baseball player and coach (died 2008)
- 1945 – Harvey Mandel, American guitarist
- 1946 – Mark Metcalf, American actor
- 1947 – Tristan Murail, French composer and educator
- 1948 – Roy Barnes, American politician, 80th Governor of Georgia
- 1948 – Jim McMillian, American basketball player (died 2016)
- 1950 – Bobby McFerrin, American singer-songwriter, producer, and conductor
- 1950 – Jerry Zucker, American director, producer, and screenwriter
- 1951 – Dominique Sanda, French model and actress
- 1952 – Douglas Adams, English author and playwright (died 2001)
- 1953 – Derek Daly, Irish-American race car driver and sportscaster
- 1953 – Jimmy Iovine, American record producer and businessman, co-founded Beats Electronics
- 1953 – Bernie LaBarge, Canadian singer-songwriter and guitarist
- 1954 – David Newman, American composer and conductor
- 1954 – Gale Norton, American politician, 48th United States Secretary of the Interior
- 1955 – Leslie Cliff, Canadian swimmer
- 1955 – Nina Hagen, German singer-songwriter
- 1956 – Willie Banks, American triple jumper
- 1956 – Helen Rollason, English sports journalist and sportscaster (died 1999)
- 1957 – Qasem Soleimani, Former Iranian commander of the Quds Force (died 2020)
- 1958 – Anissa Jones, American child actress (died 1976)
- 1959 – Nina Hartley, American pornographic actress/director, sex educator, sex-positive feminist, and author
- 1960 – Warwick Taylor, New Zealand rugby player
- 1961 – Elias Koteas, Canadian actor
- 1961 – Bruce Watson, Canadian-Scottish guitarist
- 1962 – Matt Mead, American politician, 32nd Governor of Wyoming
- 1962 – Jeffrey Nordling, American actor
- 1963 – Gary Barnett, English footballer and manager
- 1963 – Alex Kingston, English actress
- 1963 – David LaChapelle, American photographer and director
- 1964 – Peter Berg, American director, producer, screenwriter, and actor
- 1964 – Raimo Helminen, Finnish ice hockey player and coach
- 1964 – Vinnie Paul, American drummer, songwriter and producer (died 2018)
- 1964 – Shane Richie, English actor and singer
- 1965 – Nigel Adkins, English footballer and manager
- 1965 – Jesse Jackson, Jr., American lawyer and politician
- 1965 – Wallace Langham, American actor
- 1965 – Jenny Packham, English fashion designer
- 1966 – John Thompson III, American basketball player and coach
- 1967 – John Barrowman, Scottish-American actor and singer
- 1967 – Sergei Bautin, Belarusian ice hockey player and coach (died 2022)
- 1967 – Brad Carson, American lawyer and politician
- 1968 – Lisa Loeb, American singer-songwriter
- 1969 – Terrence Howard, American actor and producer
- 1969 – Soraya, Colombian-American singer-songwriter, guitarist, and producer (died 2006)
- 1969 – Michael Rulli, American politician and businessman
- 1971 – Johnny Knoxville, American actor and entertainer
- 1971 – Martin Ručinský, Czech ice hockey player
- 1971 – Lee Sang-hoon, South Korean baseball player
- 1974 – Bobby Abreu, Venezuelan baseball player
- 1976 – Thomas Gravesen, Danish footballer
- 1977 – Becky Hammon, American-Russian basketball player and coach
- 1977 – Michal Handzuš, Slovak ice hockey player
- 1978 – Didier Drogba, Ivorian footballer
- 1978 – Albert Luque, Spanish footballer
- 1979 – Elton Brand, American basketball player
- 1979 – Fred Jones, American basketball player
- 1979 – Benji Madden, American singer-songwriter and guitarist
- 1979 – Joel Madden, American singer-songwriter and producer
- 1980 – Rich Hill, American baseball player
- 1980 – Mark Rober, American YouTuber and engineer
- 1980 – Dan Uggla, American baseball player
- 1981 – David Anders, American actor
- 1981 – Lee Evans, American football player
- 1981 – Russell Lissack, English musician
- 1981 – LeToya Luckett, American singer-songwriter and actress
- 1982 – Brian Anderson, American baseball player
- 1982 – Thora Birch, American actress, producer, and director
- 1983 – Lukáš Krajíček, Czech ice hockey player
- 1984 – Rob Brown, American actor
- 1985 – Paul Bissonnette, Canadian ice hockey player
- 1985 – Daniel Vázquez Evuy, Equatoguinean footballer
- 1985 – Cassandra Fairbanks, American journalist and activist
- 1985 – Stelios Malezas, Greek footballer
- 1985 – Greg Olsen, American football player and commentator
- 1985 – Nikolai Topor-Stanley, Australian footballer
- 1986 – Dario Cologna, Swiss skier
- 1987 – Marc-André Gragnani, Canadian ice hockey player
- 1987 – Tanel Kangert, Estonian cyclist
- 1987 – Ngonidzashe Makusha, Zimbabwean sprinter and long jumper
- 1988 – Pedro Báez, Dominican baseball player
- 1988 – Fábio Coentrão, Portuguese footballer
- 1988 – Cecil Lolo, South African footballer (died 2015)
- 1989 – Malcolm Delaney, American basketball player
- 1989 – Orlando Johnson, American basketball player
- 1989 – Anton Yelchin, Russian-American actor (died 2016)
- 1990 – Ayumi Morita, Japanese tennis player
- 1992 – Austin Swift, American producer and actor
- 1993 – Jodie Comer, English actress
- 1993 – Anthony Davis, American basketball player
- 1994 – Andy Robertson, Scottish footballer
- 1996 – Conor Garland, American ice hockey player
- 1997 – Travis Konecny, Canadian ice hockey player
- 1997 – Ray Spalding, American basketball player
- 2003 – Tristan Vukčević, Serbian-Swedish basketball player
- 2004 – Margarita Kolosov, German rhythmic gymnast

== Deaths ==
=== Pre-1600 ===
- 222 – Elagabalus, Roman emperor (born 203)
- 638 – Sophronius of Jerusalem (born 560)
- 1198 – Marie of France, Countess of Champagne (born 1145)
- 1486 – Albrecht III Achilles, Elector of Brandenburg (born 1414)
- 1575 – Matthias Flacius, Croatian theologian and reformer (born 1520)
- 1576 – Juan de Salcedo, Spanish conquistador (born 1549)

=== 1601–1900 ===
- 1602 – Emilio de' Cavalieri, Italian organist and composer (born 1550)
- 1607 – Giovanni Maria Nanino, Italian composer and educator (born 1543)
- 1665 – Clemente Tabone, Maltese landowner and militia member (born c. 1575)
- 1689 – Sambhaji, second Chhatrapati of the Maratha Empire (born 1657)
- 1722 – John Toland, Irish philosopher and theorist (born 1670)
- 1759 – John Forbes, Scottish general (born 1707)
- 1820 – Benjamin West, American-English painter and academic (born 1738)
- 1851 – Marie-Louise Coidavid, Queen of Haiti (born 1778)
- 1851 – George McDuffie, American lawyer and politician, 55th Governor of South Carolina (born 1790)
- 1863 – Sir James Outram, 1st Baronet, English general (born 1803)
- 1869 – Vladimir Odoyevsky, Russian philosopher and critic (born 1803)
- 1870 – Moshoeshoe I of Lesotho (born 1786)
- 1874 – Charles Sumner, American lawyer and politician (born 1811)
- 1898 – William Rosecrans, American general and politician (born 1819)

=== 1901–present ===
- 1907 – Jean Casimir-Perier, French lawyer and politician, 6th President of France (born 1847)
- 1908 – Edmondo De Amicis, Italian journalist and author (born 1846)
- 1908 – Benjamin Waugh, English minister and activist (born 1839)
- 1915 – Thomas Alexander Browne, English-Australian author (born 1826)
- 1931 – F. W. Murnau, German-American director, producer, and screenwriter (born 1888)
- 1937 – Joseph S. Cullinan, American businessman, co-founded Texaco (born 1860)
- 1944 – Hendrik Willem van Loon, Dutch-American journalist and historian (born 1882)
- 1944 – Edgar Zilsel, Austrian historian and philosopher of science, linked to the Vienna Circle (born 1891)
- 1949 – Henri Giraud, French general and politician (born 1879)
- 1952 – Pierre Renoir, French actor and director (born 1885)
- 1955 – Alexander Fleming, Scottish biologist, pharmacologist, and botanist, Nobel Prize laureate (born 1881)
- 1955 – Oscar F. Mayer, German-American businessman, founded Oscar Mayer (born 1859)
- 1956 – Aleksanteri Aava, Finnish poet (born 1883)
- 1957 – Richard E. Byrd, American admiral and explorer (born 1888)
- 1959 – Lester Dent, American author (born 1904)
- 1960 – Roy Chapman Andrews, American paleontologist and explorer (born 1884)
- 1967 – Geraldine Farrar, American soprano and actress (born 1882)
- 1969 – John Wyndham, English author (born 1903)
- 1970 – Erle Stanley Gardner, American lawyer and author (born 1889)
- 1971 – Philo Farnsworth, American inventor, developer of the first all electronic television system (born 1906)
- 1971 – Whitney Young, American activist (born 1921)
- 1978 – Claude François, French entertainer (born 1939)
- 1982 – Edmund Cooper, English poet and author (born 1926)
- 1982 – Horace Gregory, American poet, translator, and academic (born 1898)
- 1986 – Sonny Terry, American singer and harmonica player (born 1911)
- 1989 – James Kee, American lawyer and politician (born 1917)
- 1989 – John J. McCloy, American lawyer and diplomat (born 1895)
- 1992 – Richard Brooks, American director, producer, and screenwriter (born 1912)
- 1995 – Myfanwy Talog, Welsh actress and singer (born 1945)
- 1996 – Vince Edwards, American actor and director (born 1928)
- 1999 – Herbert Jasper, Canadian psychologist, anatomist, and neurologist (born 1906)
- 1999 – Camille Laurin, Canadian psychiatrist and politician (born 1922)
- 2002 – James Tobin, American economist, Nobel Prize laureate (born 1918)
- 2006 – Bernie Geoffrion, Canadian ice hockey player and coach (born 1931)
- 2006 – Slobodan Milošević, Serbian lawyer and politician, 3rd President of the Federal Republic of Yugoslavia (born 1941)
- 2010 – Hans van Mierlo, Dutch politician, Deputy Prime Minister of the Netherlands (born 1931)
- 2012 – James B. Morehead, American colonel and pilot (born 1916)
- 2013 – Martin Adolf Bormann, German priest and theologian (born 1930)
- 2013 – Simón Alberto Consalvi, Venezuelan journalist and politician, Minister of Foreign Affairs for Venezuela (born 1927)
- 2014 – Dean Bailey, Australian footballer and coach (born 1967)
- 2014 – Joel Brinkley, American journalist and academic (born 1952)
- 2015 – Walter Burkert, German philologist and scholar (born 1931)
- 2015 – Jimmy Greenspoon, American singer-songwriter and keyboard player (born 1948)
- 2016 – Iolanda Balaș, Romanian high jumper (born 1936)
- 2016 – Doreen Massey, English geographer and political activist (born 1944)
- 2018 – Ken Dodd, English comedian and singer (born 1927)
- 2018 – Siegfried Rauch, German actor (born 1932)
- 2018 – Karl Lehmann, German cardinal (born 1936)
- 2018 – Mary Rosenblum, American science fiction and mystery author (born 1952)
- 2021 – Ray Campi, American singer and musician (born 1934)
- 2021 – Takis Mousafiris, Greek composer and songwriter (born 1936)
- 2022 – Rupiah Banda, President of Zambia (born 1937)
- 2024 – Paul Alexander, Polio survivor (born 1946)
- 2025 – Junior Bridgeman, American basketball player and businessman (born 1953)
- 2025 – Clive Revill, New Zealand actor and singer (born 1930)

== Holidays and observances ==
- Christian feast day:
  - Alberta of Agen
  - Constantine
  - Óengus of Tallaght
  - Sophronius of Jerusalem
  - Vindicianus
- Day of Restoration of Independence from the Soviet Union in 1990 (Lithuania)
- Moshoeshoe Day (Lesotho)
- Saudi Flag Day

== Notes ==
- Larkin, Colin (2011). The Encyclopedia of Popular Music. Omnibus Press. p. 639. ISBN 978-0-85712-595-8.
