= 2010 Colombian rainy season =

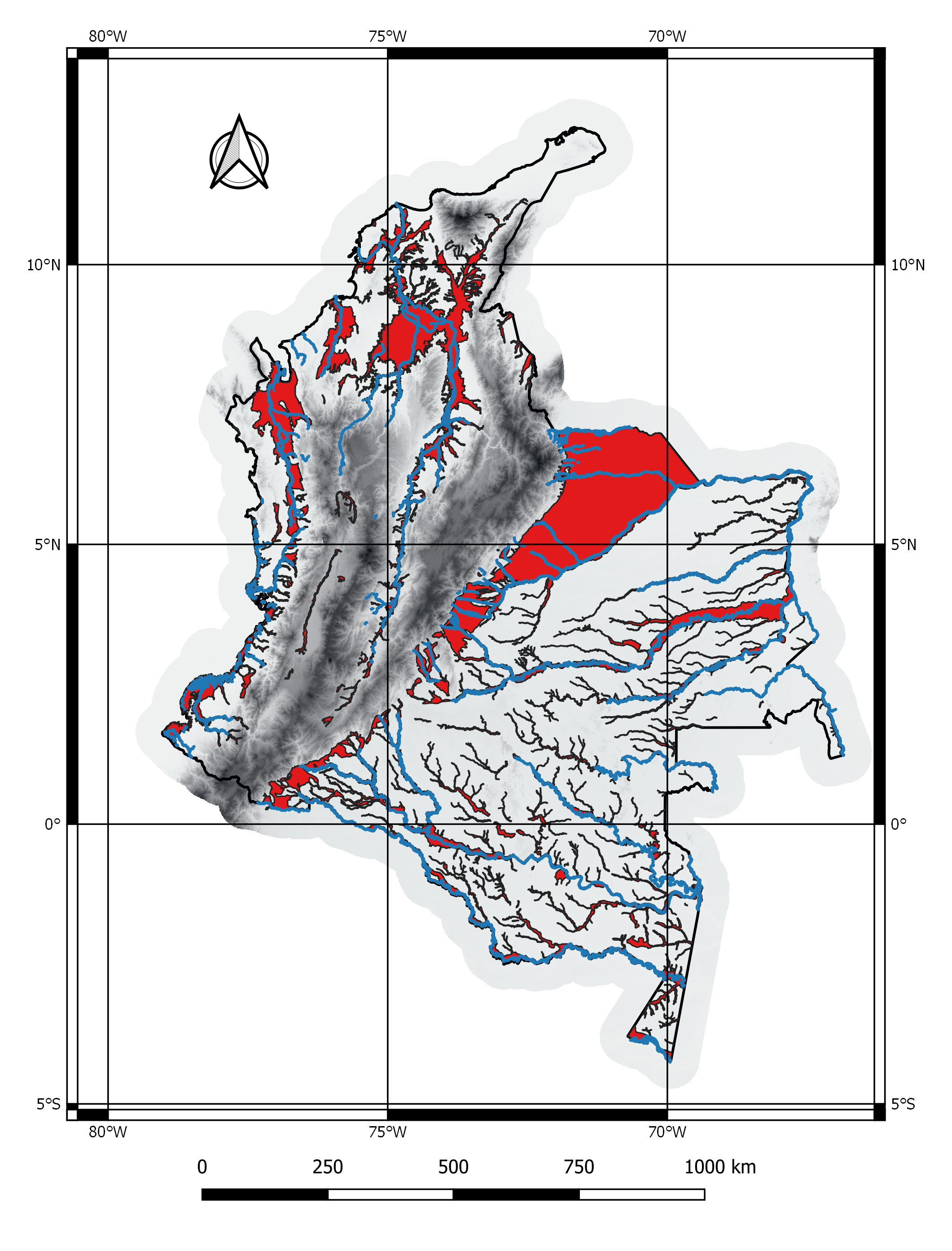
- In red flood areas during 2010 and 2011 events according to IDEAM. In blue river lines according to IGAC and SIGOT. In grayscale DEM according to GMTED2010 resampled to 250m.
- Date: November 2010 – Ongoing
- Location: Colombia
- Deaths: 301
- Property damage: more than $6 billion

The 2010 Colombian rainy season was an unusually heavy wet season that affected Colombia during the second semester of 2010. The continuous rainfalls in combination with unstable grounds and dwellings located in high risk zones contributed to the widespread damages. The flooding and associated landslides killed 174 persons, left 225 wounded and 19 others missing. 1.5 million were left homeless.

== Meteorology ==
Colombia is a country located in the Intertropical Convergence Zone and as an effect to this, the country is vulnerable to the meteorological patterns that affect the Caribbean region such as hurricanes and tropical storms. Remnants of Hurricane Tomas in combination with La Niña made the 2010 wet season of Colombia one of the deadliest and heaviest in rainfalls in the last 40 years. The torrential rainfall, wind gusts, electric storms and a constant light rain in some places started in June 2010 and became stronger and more frequent in August and September.

== Impact ==
The floods and landslides affected 70% of the country and left homeless more than 2,2 million people. 301 people have been killed

=== Guajira Department ===
The Colombian System of Information for the Prevention and Attention to Disaster CREPAD (Sistema de informacion para la Prevencion y Atencion de Desatres) established that throughout 2010 there were 10.303 people affected by the rains with a total of 1.819 families and 9 homes completely destroyed and 334 in very bad conditions.

The department of Guajira being located in the northern tip of Colombia was seriously affected by the 2010 hurricane season. Remnants of the tropical storm Matthew hit Guajira and the Atlantic coast of Colombia with heavy rains. Among the most affected municipalities are Maicao, Riohacha and Manaure. Maicao and Riohacha have been the most affected ones since a number of families live in homes usually located in lower grounds. This communities are usually the most vulnerable because many of them are organized without the control of the Office for the distribution of land that regulates the housing building in Colombia.

=== Atlántico Department ===
The department of Atlántico has been particularly affected by the rupture of the levees of the Dique Channel (Canal del Dique). To the south of the Department of Atlántico some tributaries of the Magdalena river crested and flooded entire towns. This flood was able to raise the levels of the El Guajaro dam to a flow of 1400 cubic meters per second.

According to Semana magazine the emergency has been compared to the floods caused by Hurricane Katrina in New Orleans, United States. The magazine also predicted that is possible that many of the inhabitants of southern Atlántico might never be able to come back to their lands and will have to change their way of life due to the impact of the floods.

=== Bolívar Department ===
Bolívar Department is also one of the most affected areas of the Colombia rainy season of 2010. In December 2010 the Minister of Defense Rodrigo Rivera Salazar traveled to the city of Cartagena (capital of Bolivar) in order to evaluate and coordinate the steps to take to diminish the emergency faced by the department. The minister informed that Bolivar had 60 thousand affected households and called it "the department most seriously hit" by the rainy season and its floods.

=== Cundinamarca Department and Bogotá ===
In November 2010 the governor of the Cundinamarca Department, Andres Gonzalez alerted the municipalities of Tabio, Chia and Cajica since they were under threat by a possible cresting of the Frio river. He also advised the population about the possibility of including the municipality of Soacha because of the cresting of the Bogotá River. After the onset of heavy rains on the paramus of Guerrero the Bogotá river finally flooded some areas affecting different municipalities.

=== Córdoba Department ===
On December 15, 2010, the Sinú River started to flood affecting a number of municipalities in the department of Córdoba. On December 16 the city of Montería had 8 neighborhoods under water. The government issued an alert and mandated the evacuation of the city.

=== Norte de Santander Department ===
32 out of 40 municipalities of Norte de Santander Department had been unreachable by the debri and floods in its roads. The most serious blocking occurred on the Ocana–Cúcuta road. The landslides and avalanches in some parts affected over 60 thousand people.

On November 8 a landslide occurred in the municipality of El Carmen. The most affected zones were the neighborhood of El Libano where 19 houses were destroyed and 5 more were rendered unusable. The Colombian Air Force had to move food and medical supplies on helicopters since the road access was blocked The town of Guamalito was completely affected with its inhabitants without potable water, electric power nor access to the cellphone networks.

On December 17 the municipality of Gramalote suffered a landslide that affected 400 homes at the periphery of the town. The entire population was evacuated. In addition to the rain, a geological fault made the houses in this town to crumble like poker cards. 100 houses collapsed and some streets and pedestrian walkways broke open as if an earthquake had taken place. It is plausible that the town of Gramalote ceased to exist according to a report of Caracol Radio.

=== Antioquia ===
On December 5 a landslide occurred in Bello, neighbourhood "la Gabriela".

== Reaction ==
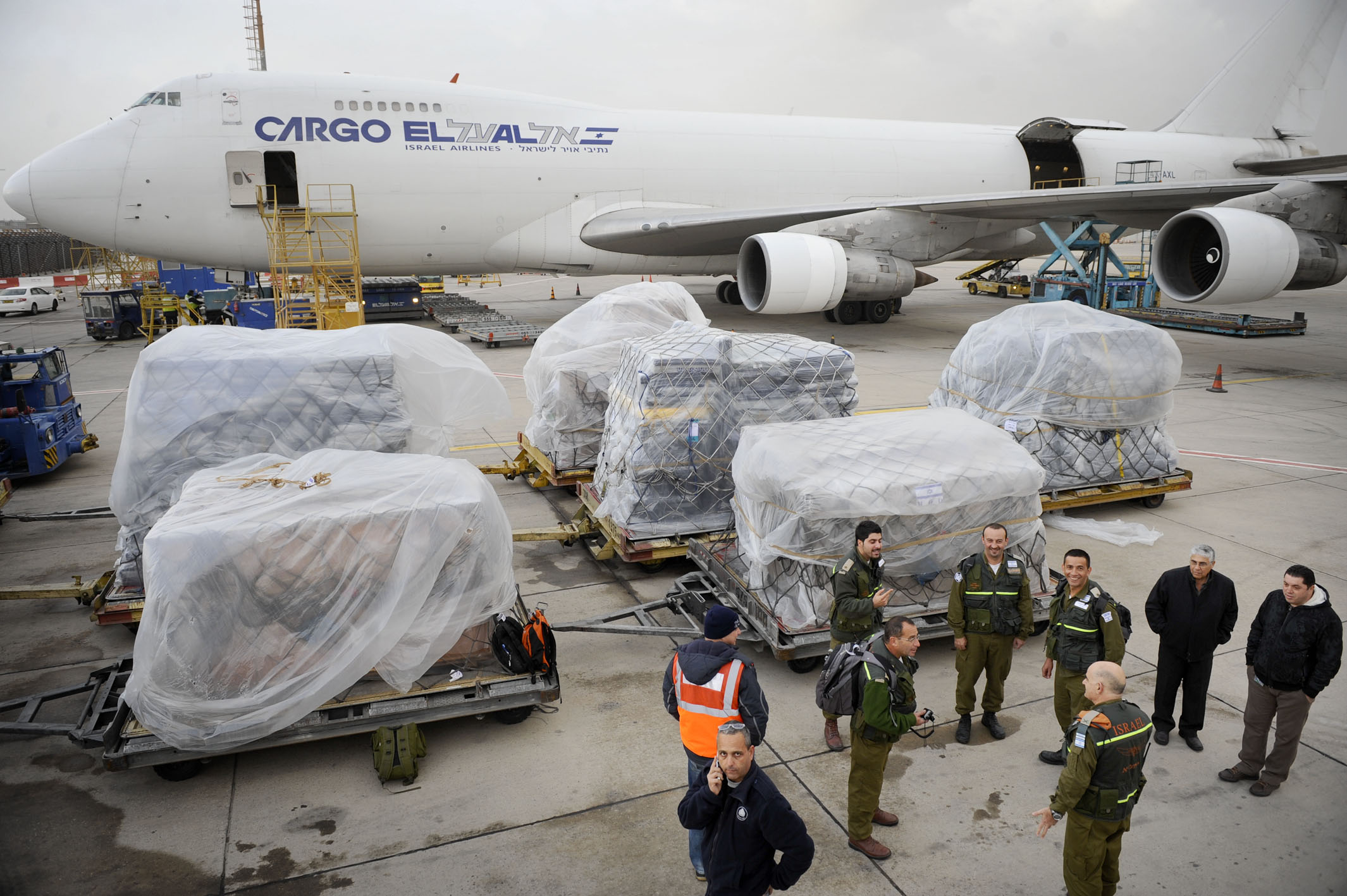
The Israeli aid delegation, composed of personnel from the IDF and the Ministry of Defense, departs for Colombia.

According to the minister of the environment, housing and territorial development, Beatriz Uribe Botero, the government is currently alleviating the needs of people in "unavoidable highest risk" circumstances and has requested additional resources for unexpected events.

The Minister has accounted for 275,569 damaged houses and about two thousand destroyed, most of them in inhabited areas. The assigned budget for the repairing of damaged houses is 1.76 billion Colombian pesos (approx. US$880 million).

=== Request for help to the international community ===
On December 7, Colombian president Juan Manuel Santos announced that Colombia would make a petition for a credit to the World Bank of 150 million dollars. Additionally he would make use of 25 million dollars seized to drug traffickers in order to help 1.3 million people affected by the floods and rains and the families of 154 people killed by the floods and landslides. On November 25, 2010, president Santos ordered chancellor of Colombia (equivalent to Secretary of State in the United States) Maria Angela Holguín to send a formal request of help to all the international representatives and accredited multilateral organizations located in Bogotá.

Minister of the Interior and justice German Vargas Lleras announced that by decree the government declares a "national catastrophe" in order to make use of credits to alleviate the needs of the victims. Such decree was sent to the council of ministers, who approved it and provided access to 150 million dollars in credit from the World Bank. Vargas Lleras said that the priority was to alleviate the humanitarian emergency and then to begin with the reconstruction of houses and the prevention of new tragedies.

=== United States ===
The government of President Barack Obama through its ambassador Michael McKinley expressed commitment to the Colombian people affected by the rainy season.

On December 15, 2010, McKinley announced that the American government had donated 1.3 million dollars as initial help and within the following weeks a team of American engineers of the American Army would arrive in order to help in the reparation of the Dique Channel.

=== Israel ===
On December 12, 2010, following a decision of the IDF and the Israeli Ministry of Defense, a delegation from the Home Front Command was sent, carrying approximately 50 tons of equipment including 20 tons of dry food, five thousand medical kits, two thousand blankets, one thousand ponchos, one thousand mattresses and one hundred tents.

=== Ecuador ===
The government of Ecuador donated 32 tons of food and supplies for the victims. The supplies are mostly military rations which use has proven successful in other disasters. The national secretary of Risk Management Maria del Pilar Cornejo said "although we are a country limited in resources that doesn't limit our capacity to help, we had been helped before and in one way or another we are giving back".

=== Russia ===
Russia sent a plane with 50 tents, 2,000 blankets, two mobile power stations and 500 kilograms of medical supplies.

== See also ==
- 2011 Colombia floods
- 2010 Bolivia forest fires
- 2010 Northeastern Brazil floods
- Climate of Colombia
- Global storm activity of late 2010
- Hurricane Tomas (2010)
- Intertropical Convergence Zone
- January 2011 Rio de Janeiro floods and mudslides
- Tropical upper tropospheric trough
- Western Hemisphere Warm Pool
- Wet season
