= January 2011 Rio de Janeiro floods and mudslides =

Coordinates: 22°54′30″S 43°11′47″W

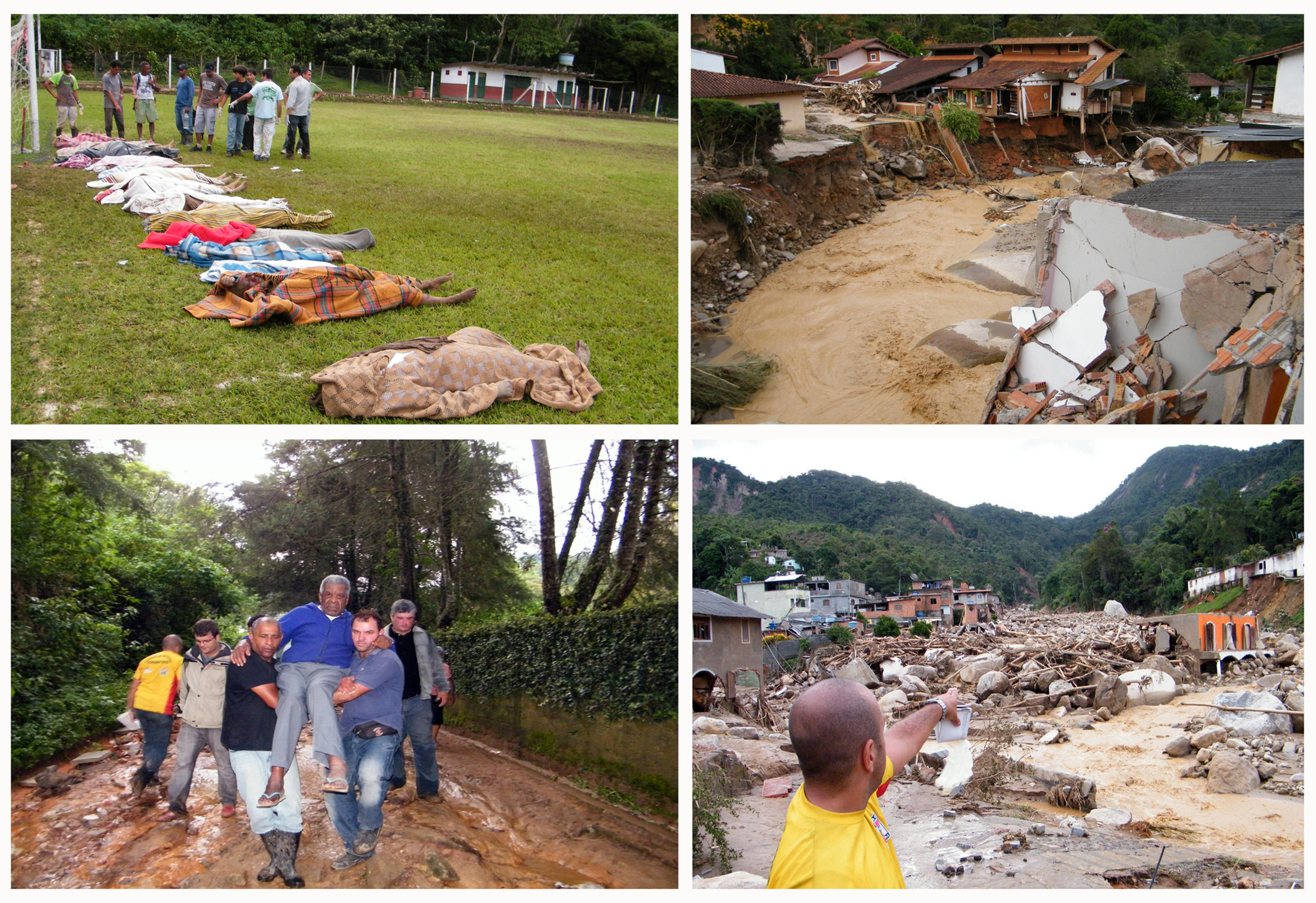
- Date: 11 January 2011
- Location: Teresópolis, Nova Friburgo, Petrópolis, Sumidouro and São José do Vale do Rio Preto, State of Rio de Janeiro, Brazil
- Cause: Flood, landslide
- Deaths: 916
- Property damage: 2.0 billion Reais ($1.2 billion USD)

A series of floods and mudslides took place in January 2011 in several towns of the Mountainous Region (Região Serrana), in the Brazilian state of Rio de Janeiro. Casualties occurred in the cities of Nova Friburgo, Teresópolis, Petrópolis, Bom Jardim, Sumidouro and São José do Vale do Rio Preto. The floods caused at least 916 deaths, including 424 in Nova Friburgo and 378 in Teresópolis. While local media claims that the combination of floods, mudslides and landslides in Rio de Janeiro became the worst weather-related natural disaster in Brazilian history, some contend that a similar weather-related tragedy that took place in the same state in 1967 was much deadlier, and that an estimated 1,700 people lost their lives on that occasion.

The cities that reported human casualties are located in a mountainous area, in the neighborhood of the Serra dos Órgãos national park. The area is a tourist hotspot due to its geographic features, historical landmarks and mild temperatures. Many buildings, however, are directly exposed to landslide hazards because of the steep terrain.

== Flood details ==
In a 24-hour period between 11 and 12 January 2011, the local weather service registered more rainfall than what is expected for the entire month. Flooding of many areas in the region followed immediately. The disaster caused widespread property damage and the supply of public utilities such as electricity, running water and phone lines was affected. Around 2960 people had their homes destroyed.

The most important watercourse to inundate the region was the Santo Antônio river. According to the National Institute for Space Research, the precipitation in Rio de Janeiro was caused by a Humidity Convergence Zone, a lesser form of the South Atlantic Convergence Zone. Nova Friburgo was the city most heavily affected by the floods; Teresópolis also suffered extensive damage and loss of life. In Petrópolis, the Itaipava district, an area with many luxury vacation homes, reported most casualties. Petrópolis Brewery and the local campus of UERJ in Nova Friburgo were isolated by floods. The cities of Sumidouro, São José do Vale do Rio Preto and Areal also were struck, as rivers Preto and Piabanha rose.

It has been commented that the majority of deaths were in poverty-stricken areas, and that the impact in these areas could have been much lower if it had not been for the systematically poor conditions of Brazil's favelas. The lack of proper attention to these areas has led some to describe the disaster as "more manmade than natural."

== Governmental response ==
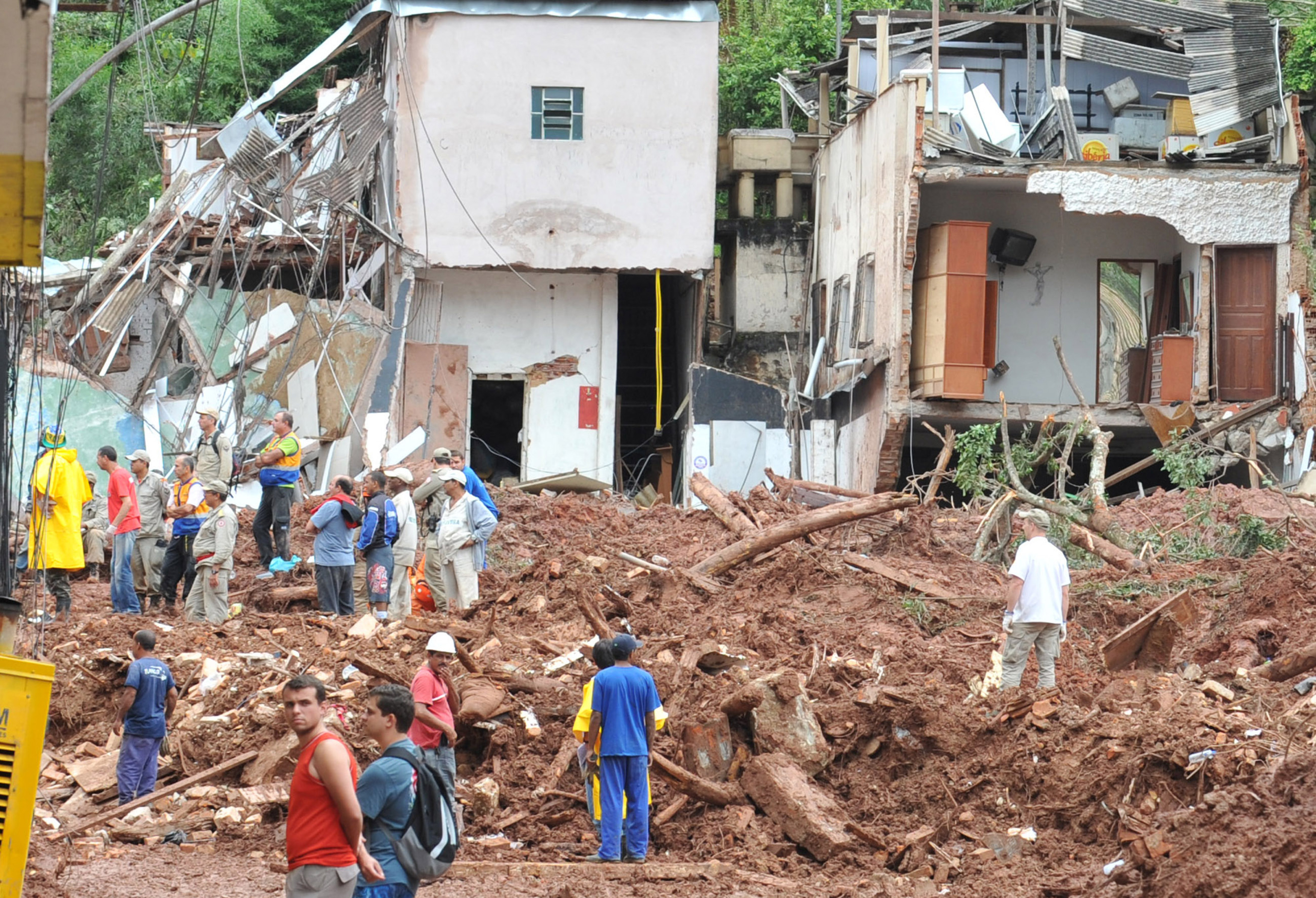
Destroyed households in Nova Friburgo

President Dilma Rousseff declared that an emergency R$ 780 million (U.S. $466.2 million) would become available for reconstruction workers. Acting governor Luiz Fernando Pezão sent reinforcements to the affected region and requested urgent federal assistance in machinery, helicopters and manpower. Rescue efforts were led by municipal governments, which also provided shelter and amenities for the newly homeless, often in schools. The Brazilian Navy and the Rio de Janeiro state government set up field hospitals to assist the victims and to support rescue workers. A team of workers in the operation had prior experience with the 2010 Rio de Janeiro floods and 2010 Haiti earthquake. Analysts have commented that President Rousseff through her management of the crisis "passed... her first big test", but that the structural challenges that make certain (poverty-stricken) areas particularly hard hit in times of environmental disaster, still need to be addressed.

== International reaction ==
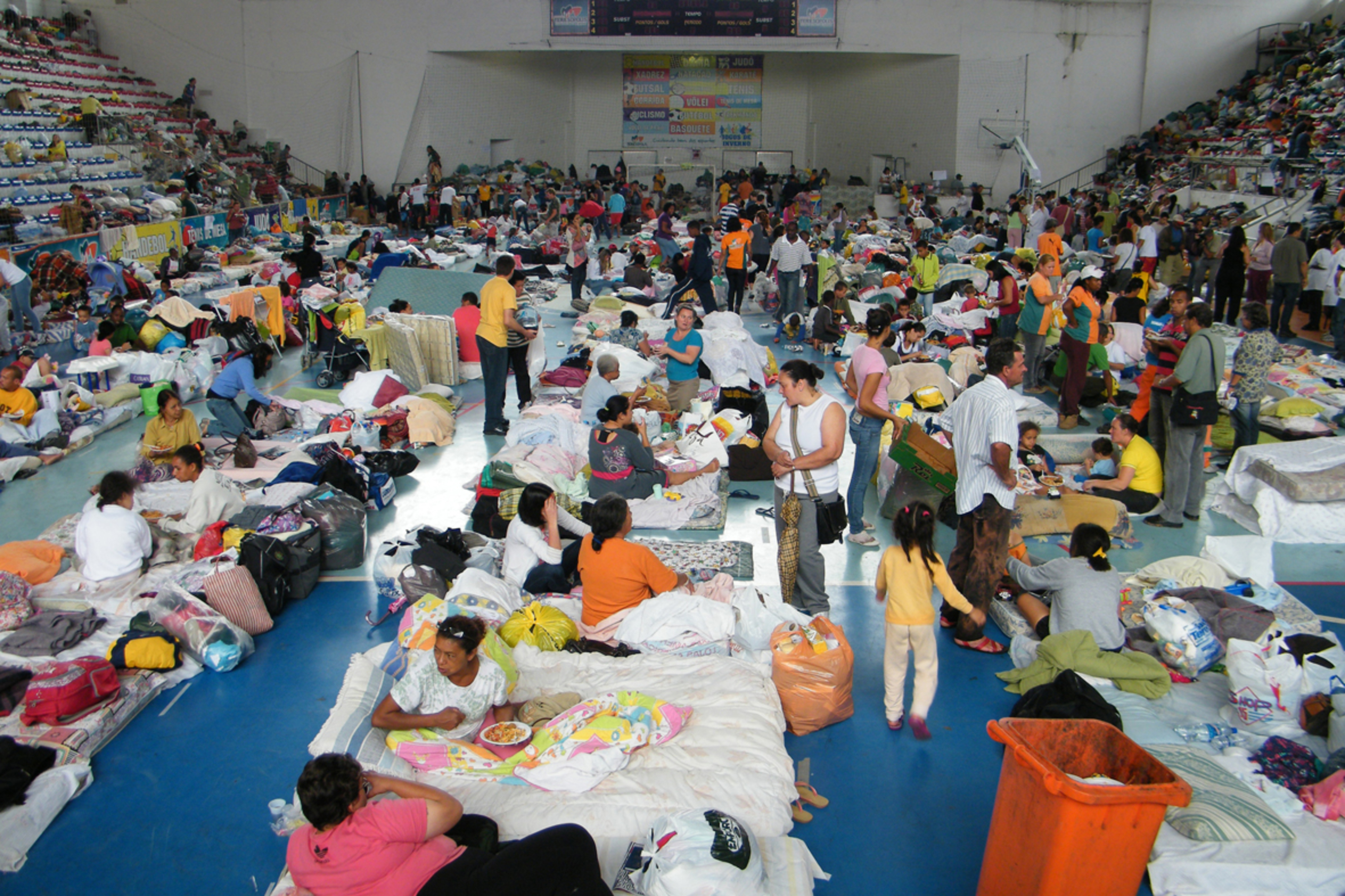
Improvised shelter for the homeless in Teresópolis

- The prime minister of Spain, José Luis Rodríguez Zapatero, expressed his condolences over the "tragedy provoked by the storms," and offered assistance from the Spanish government.
- The Ministry of Foreign Relations of Argentina transmitted its "solidarity to the government and the people of Brazil," expressed condolences and offered "immediate aid."
- The President of Iran, Mahmoud Ahmadinejad, sent a message of "solidarity to the Brazilian nation and people."
- The President of Mexico, Felipe Calderón, published a communiqué to "transmit his condolences to the families of the victims", as well as "support and solidarity in this painful moment."
- The President of Portugal, Aníbal Cavaco Silva, sent a message to President Rousseff expressing Portugal's "deep condolences and heartfelt solidarity" towards the "brotherly people of Brazil".
- The Foreign Minister of Australia, Kevin Rudd, expressed its sympathy and solidarity with Brazil, "As Australia's Foreign Minister I extend our heartfelt condolences, our sympathy, our solidarity and our support to the good people of Brazil, going through a terrible time right now. "

== See also ==
- 2009 Brazilian floods and mudslides
- January 2010 Rio de Janeiro floods and mudslides
- April 2010 Rio de Janeiro floods and mudslides
- 2010 Northeastern Brazil floods
