= 2011 Colombia floods =

- Date: April, September–November 2011 (ongoing)
- Location: Colombia
- Deaths: At least 400 (April); 81 (September–November)
- Property damage: US$5 billion (est.)

A series of floods in Colombia began in late April 2011, coinciding with the country's rainy season. Torrential rains triggered extensive flooding and landslides that killed at least 187 people and affected 1.2 million. It destroyed and damaged 1,450 and 149,270 houses respectively, and left more than 69,000 residents homeless. Estimates have placed damages at US$5 billion. After September, a second wave of flooding and landslides (coinciding with the year's second rainy season) killed another 81 people, wounded 65 more and affected approximately 289,000 (including 61,000 families). However the heavy rain and flooding effected 28 out of 32 departments of Colombia.

== Flooding ==
More than a year's worth of rain fell in under a month, causing the Magdalena and Cauca Rivers to overflow their banks. Roughly 29,000 people were evacuated from flood-prone areas along the rivers.

=== Landslides ===
There were many landslides as a result of the surplus rain. On 6 November, a landslide occurred in the Manizales department of Caldas, killing 45 people and leaving another 158 homeless. The Colombian Red Cross arrived at the scene with about 50 rescuers, while approximately 600 volunteer rescuers searched for 13 to 15 people trapped underneath the rubble.

== Response ==
On 23 April, a state of emergency was declared for the entire country. Central government relief aid from the capital Bogotá amounted to US$178 million by April 25. President Juan Manuel Santos stated that the Magdalena River reached its highest level in history due to the excessive rains. Scientists estimated that roughly 9% of the country could be underwater by the end of the 2011 rainy season.

== See also ==
- 2010 Colombian rainy season
- Floods in Colombia
