= Sumidouro =

- Municipality
- Município de Sumidouro
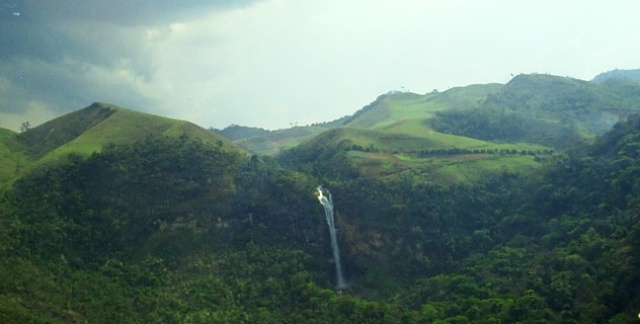
- Conde d'Eu Waterfall

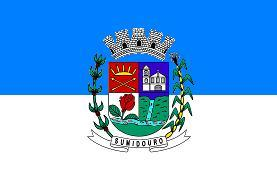
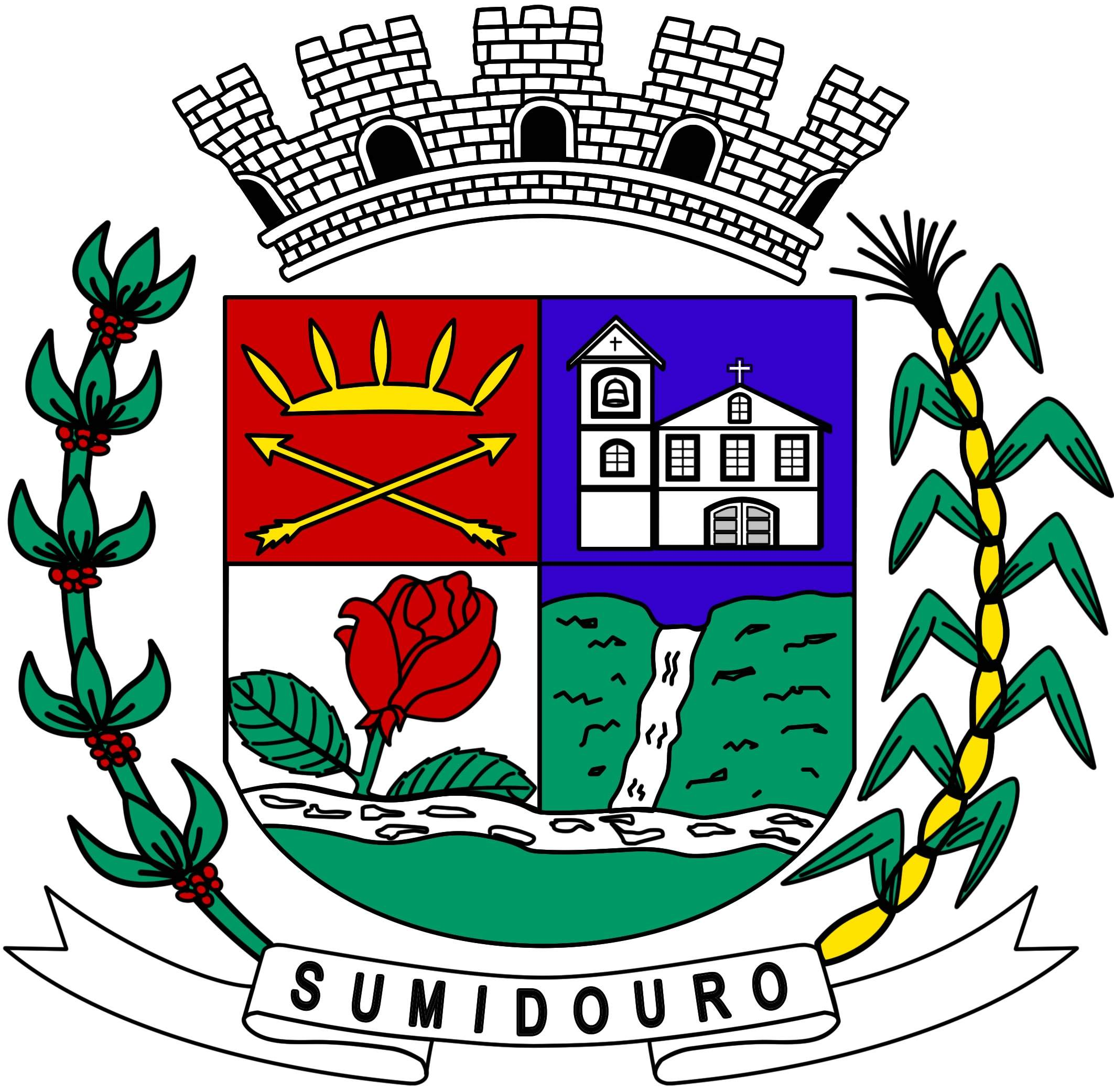
- Flag Coat of arms

- Location of Sumidouro in the state of Rio de Janeiro

- Location of Sumidouro in Brazil
- Coordinates: 22°03′00″S 42°40′30″W
- Country: Brazil
- Region: Southeast
- State: Rio de Janeiro

Government
  - Prefeito: Eliesio Peres da Silva (PMDB)

Area
  - Total: 395.516 km^{2} (152.710 sq mi)
- Elevation: 355 m (1,165 ft)

Population (2020)
  - Total: 15,667
- Time zone: UTC−3 (BRT)

Sumidouro (Portuguese pronunciation: [sumiˈdo(w)ɾu]) is a municipality located in the Brazilian state of Rio de Janeiro. Its population was 15,667 (2020) and its area is 395 km^{2}.
