= April 2010 Rio de Janeiro floods and mudslides =

Extreme weather event in Brazil

Coordinates: 22°54′30″S 43°11′47″W

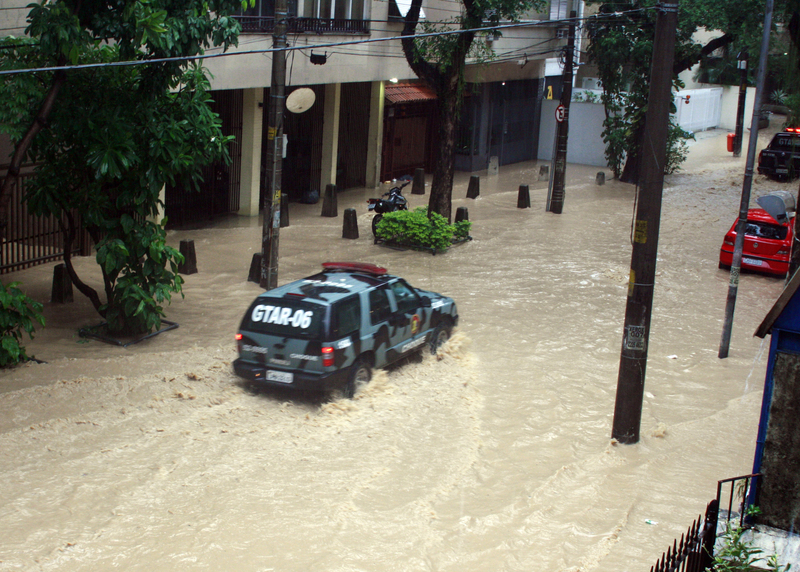

Meteorological history
- Duration: 5 April – mid-April 2010

Overall effects
- Fatalities: At least 249
- Damage: ~R$23.8 billion (US$1.351×10^{10} in 2010)
- Areas affected: State of Rio de Janeiro

The April 2010 Rio de Janeiro floods and mudslides was an extreme weather event that affected the State of Rio de Janeiro in Brazil in the first days of April 2010. At least 212 people died, 161 people have been injured (including several rescuers), while at least 15,000 people have been made homeless. A further 10,000 homes are thought to be at risk from mudslides, most of them in the favelas, the shanty towns built on the hillsides above downtowns. Damage from the flooding has been estimated at $23.76 billion reais (US$13.3bn, €9.9bn), about 8% of the gross domestic product (GDP) of Rio de Janeiro State.

The flooding particularly affected the city of Rio de Janeiro, where at least 60 people died, and its surrounding area. Deaths were also reported in the cities of Niterói (132), São Gonçalo (16), Paracambi (1), Engenheiro Paulo de Frontin (1), Magé (1), Nilópolis (1) and Petrópolis (1). Several municipalities, including Niterói and municipalities to the east such as Maricá and Araruama, have declared states of emergency or of public calamity. The Governor of Rio de Janeiro State, Sérgio Cabral Filho, declared three days of official mourning for the dead.

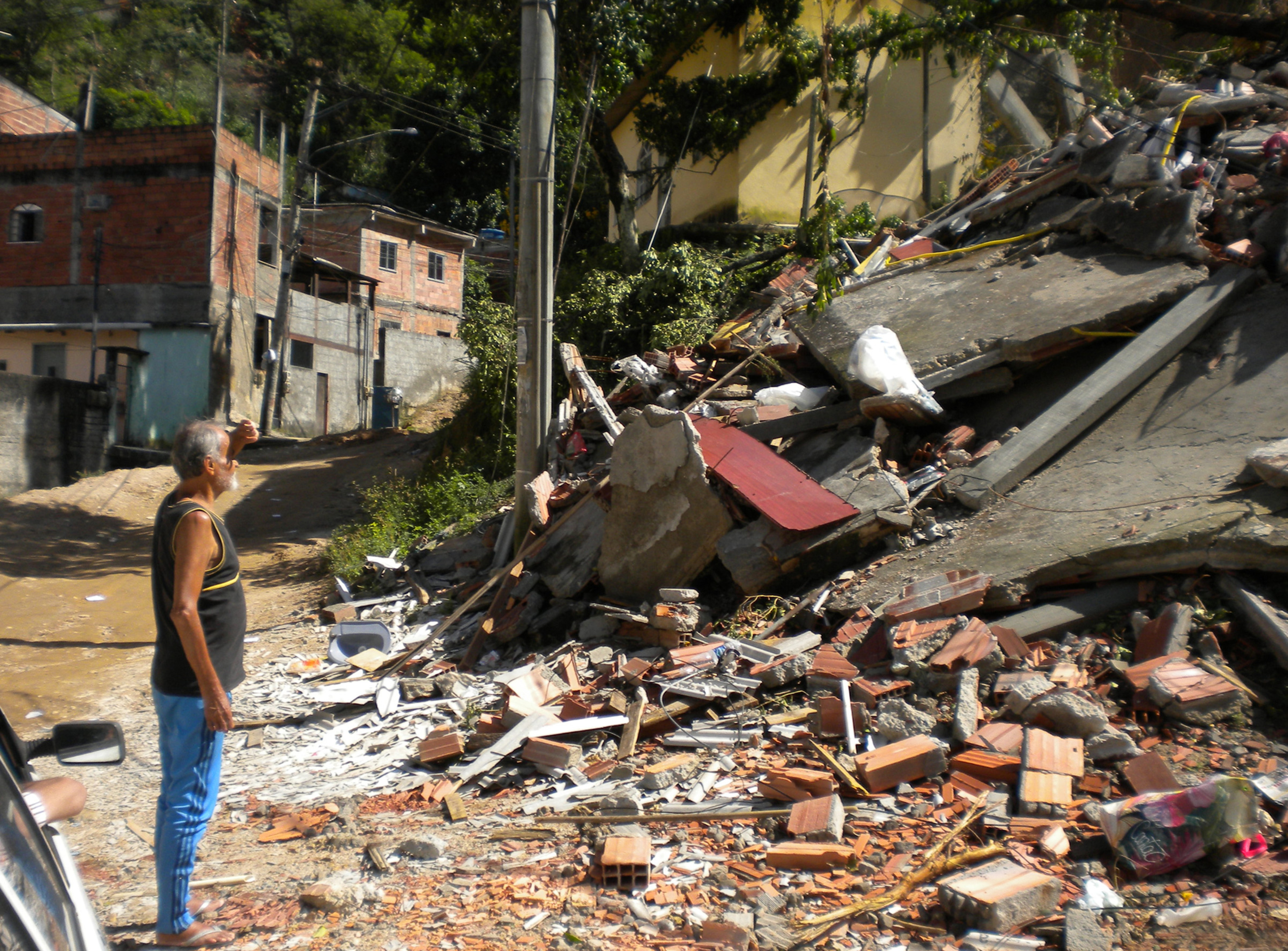
A resident of São Gonçalo stands in front of his destroyed house.

Heavy rain started at around 5 p.m. local time (2000 UTC) on Monday April 5th in Rio de Janeiro city, and continued for 24 hours, with a total of 28.8 cm (11½ in.) of rain falling, more than was predicted for the whole of April and the heaviest rainfall for 30 years. The Brazilian TV station Globo said the rainfall was equivalent to 300,000 Olympic swimming pools of water. There were drivers who were forced to sleep in their cars. There were also firemen who used rubber dinghies to rescue passengers from stranded buses, and shopkeepers who worked very quickly to prevent the rainfall from destroying their businesses.

Rio de Janeiro mayor Eduardo Paes admitted that the city's preparedness for heavy rainfall had been "less than zero," but added "there isn’t a city that wouldn’t have had problems with this level of rainfall."

A further landslide hit a slum in Niterói late on April 7. It is thought to have killed at least 150 people. Around 200 people were missing in the town as of April 13th, 2010.

After nearly 300 landslides hit the area, the statue of Christ the Redeemer was cut off from traffic for the first time in history.

More than 300 homes were bulldozed after the landslides, and it is estimated that close to 12,000 families will need to be relocated by 2012 due to the damage from the floods.

== Governmental Reaction ==
During this storm, "14,000 people were forced to leave their homes and seek refuge with relatives or at shelters." Over 180 mudslides occurred that Tuesday. The governor of Rio advised that people stayed in their homes so that the emergency workers can "concentrate on reaching those in need." The city mayor also advised that everyone sought safer ground, and if possible, stayed in their homes.

On 13 April, United Press International reported on shortages of drinking water. City authorities initially were not able to say when power, gas, and water supplies were going to come back on, which made the residents start complaining of the slow relief. They also blame on decades of negligence for this disaster, since Rio de Janeiro has the highest proportion of people living in poverty.

Although there were many complaints, the storm itself was not "extraordinary". Rain and mudslides were common during the month of April. The President declared that "once the storm has completely receded, a new drainage system would be built." He also said that it would not affect the 2016 Olympics, since the projects involving the Olympics would take six years to complete.

== See also ==
- January 2010 Rio de Janeiro floods and mudslides
- January 2011 Rio de Janeiro floods and mudslides
- 2010 Northeastern Brazil floods
