= 2010 Northeastern Brazil floods =

Meteorological history
- Duration: mid-June 2010

Overall effects
- Fatalities: At least 51
- Damage: Unknown
- Areas affected: Alagoas and Pernambuco, Brazil

The 2010 Northeastern Brazil rains caused widespread flooding in the second half of June 2010. The flooding mainly hit Alagoas and Pernambuco, where entire villages were carried away, killing dozens and causing hundreds to disappear.

President of Brazil Luiz Inácio Lula da Silva convened an emergency session to arrange for the distribution of aid. The distribution of aid was complex, because the affected cities were isolated rural areas with few intact roads (in Pernambuco 79 bridges in critical areas were destroyed by the flood). Lula also cancelled a trip to Canada for a meeting of the G20 major economies.

== Flood details ==
At least 44 people were killed, some 1,000 are missing, including 500 in União dos Palmares and at least 120,000 had to leave their homes. Entire towns were destroyed. Dams burst and river levels rose, engulfing entire towns. Electricity and telephone services were disrupted and destroyed. The homeless collected in schools and churches in their search for shelter.

The Mundau river in Alagoas State flooded Uniao dos Palmares, causing the disappearance of at least 500 people. Corpses floated along on the beaches and in the rivers. Over 40,000 houses in Alagoas were flooded, affecting 22 towns. The death toll at one point of time in Alagoas was 26 and in Pernambuco state was 13.

Rio Largo in Alagoas had its banks completely destroyed by water due to a dam collapse, leaving only a mangled railway and muddy ruins. A search is underway there for survivors.

Weather officials in Alagoas predicted rain until at least June 25, 2010. More than 40 centimetres (16 in) of rain fell over a four-day period.

Map of Northeastern Brazil

== Response ==
President of Brazil Luiz Inácio Lula da Silva met in an emergency session with the governors of both states to decide how to distribute emergency funds. The federal government sent supplies to the disrupted areas, consisting of R$100 million reais in funds, 20,000 food baskets, mattresses and blankets. 10 tons of supplies were delivered by 24 June which is not yet enough to cover the large amounts of destruction. Emergency services and the military embarked on missions to ensure supplies were safely delivered to isolated towns. There were difficulties with the delivery of aid as roads and rail routes were affected by the floods. This led to some citizens to retrieve their food from the mud for eating instead. On 24 June, the federal government announced it would grant an additional R$500 million reais for emergency relief efforts in the two states.

President Lula cancelled his trip to Canada for the meeting of the G20 major economies as the situation unfolded, sending economy minister Guido Mantega instead. Those affected by the floods watched the Brazil national football team take on the Portugal national football team in the 2010 FIFA World Cup in makeshift shelters.

There are plans to relocate the entire city of Branquinha, one of the most damaged cities in Alagoas, to a higher place near the main highways. No public service buildings were left standing and the State Secretary of Health issued concerns about contaminated water causing diseases.

== See also ==
- 2009 Brazilian floods and mudslides
- January 2010 Rio de Janeiro floods and mudslides
- April 2010 Rio de Janeiro floods and mudslides
- 2010 Tennessee floods
- 2010 Central European floods
- 2010 South China floods
