= January 2010 Rio de Janeiro floods and mudslides =

Extreme weather event in the State of Rio de Janeiro, Brazil

- The State of Rio de Janeiro within Brazil

Meteorological history
- Duration: 30 December 2009 – 6 January 2010

Overall effects
- Fatalities: At least 85
- Areas affected: State of Rio de Janeiro, Brazil

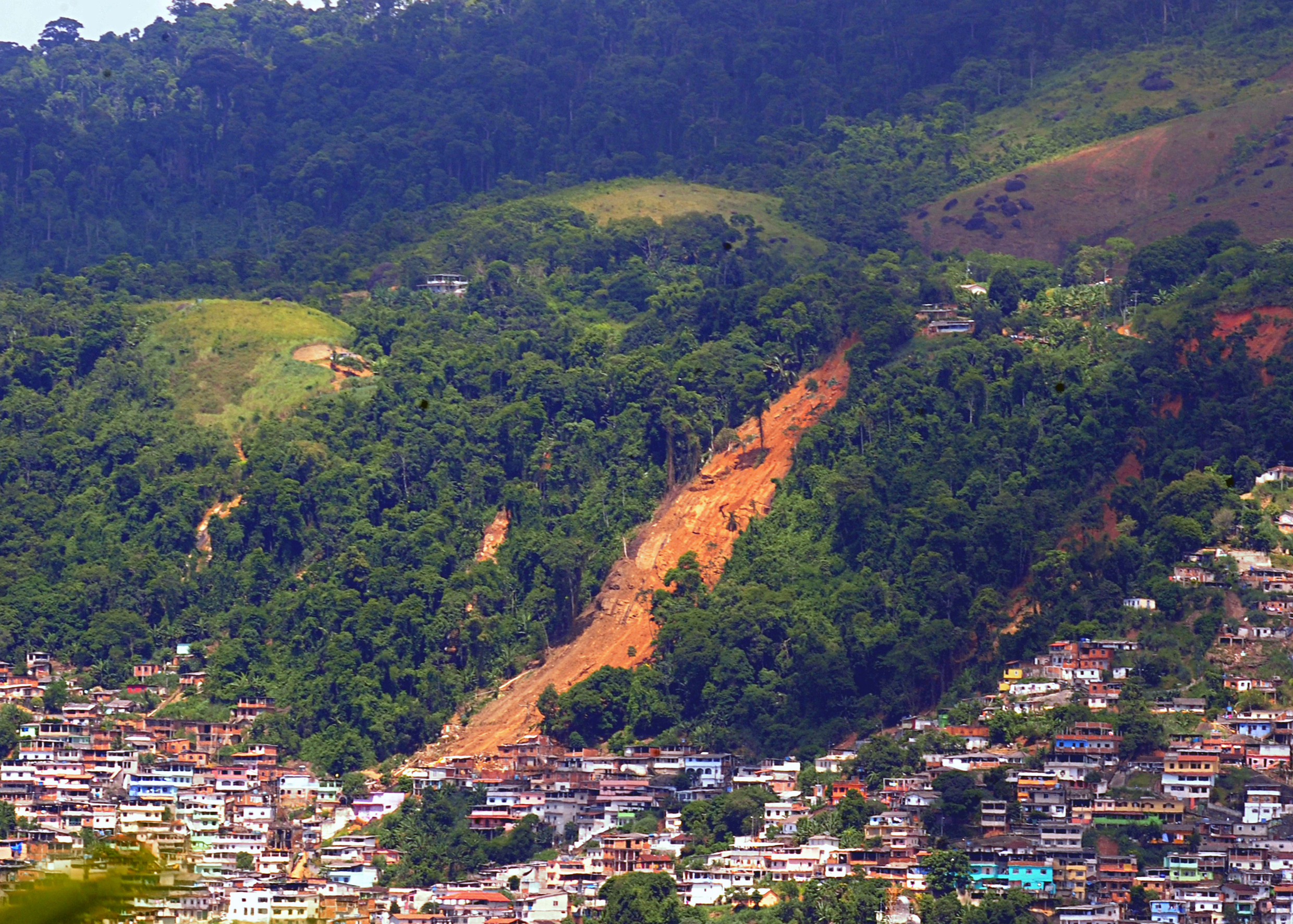
Angra dos Reis (RJ) - Vista do Morro da Carioca, in central Angra, where people died in the landslides.

The January 2010 Rio de Janeiro floods and mudslides was an extreme weather event that affected the State of Rio de Janeiro in Brazil in the first days of January 2010. At least 85 people died, with at least 29 people in the Hotel Sankey after it was destroyed by landslides, and many more have been injured. More than 4,000 people were forced to evacuate their homes.

The worst affected municipality was Angra dos Reis, about 150 kilometres (93 mi) southwest of the city of Rio de Janeiro. At least 35 people were killed at a resort on Ilha Grande: about forty people were staying in the hotel which was buried under a mudslide, and the death toll is expected to rise further. Brazil's only functioning nuclear power plant, Central Nuclear Almirante Álvaro Alberto, is also located within the municipality: plans were made for a temporary shutdown, as blocked roads would make any evacuation difficult or impossible in the event of an incident at the plant.

In Rio Grande do Sul, at least seven people died and 20 went missing after a bridge collapsed due to heavy rains.

Around 60 tons of dead fish washed up in a lagoon in Rio de Janeiro beginning in January, possibly as a result of local ocean anoxia caused by algal blooms triggered by increased eutrophication from the excess run-off produced by the flooding.

== See also ==
- 2010 Machu Picchu floods
- April 2010 Rio de Janeiro floods and mudslides
- Cyclone Catarina
- El Nino
- January 2011 Rio de Janeiro floods and mudslides
