= Panambí =

- Municipality and village
- Location within Misiones Province Location within Argentina
- Country: Argentina
- Province: Misiones
- Department: Oberá
- Time zone: UTC−3 (ART)

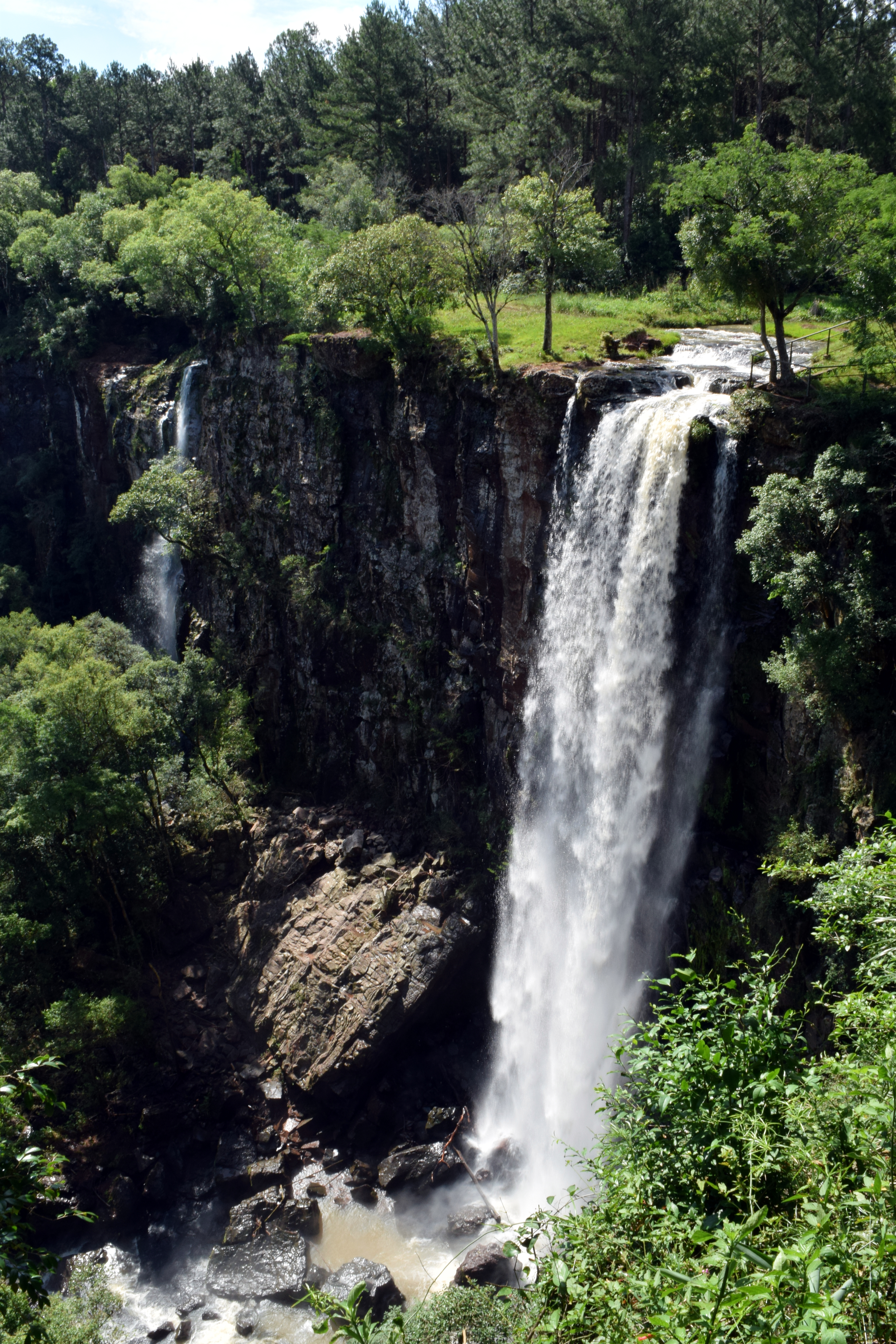
El Salto Paca, a local landmark, is located in Panambí.

Panambí is a village and municipality in Misiones Province in north-eastern Argentina.
