= Timeline of Nova Friburgo =

The following is a timeline of the history of the city of Nova Friburgo, Brazil.

== 19th century ==
- 1818 – King John VI proposed the creation of a planned settlement in Brazil.
- May 1818 – A royal decree of May 1818, authorized the Canton of Fribourg of Switzerland, to establish a colony of 100 Swiss families in the Morro Queimado Farm, in Cantagalo District.
- 1819 and 1820:
  - The region was settled by 265 Swiss families, in total 1,458 immigrants.
  - The St. John the Baptist Cathedral was established on 3 January 1820 by a decree of Dom João VI.
- 1822 – Following the Independence of Brazil, the Imperial Government continued the policy of populating the nation by attracting European colonization.
- 1824 – Eighty German families previously assigned to settlements in the Province of Bahia, for unknown reasons ended up in Nova Friburgo, where they arrived on the 3 and 4 May 1824.
- 1872 - The Baron of Nova Friburgo brought to the region the Leopoldina Railroad, to allow for the flow of the coffee from Cantagalo.
- 1890 – Similar arrivals of Italians, Portuguese and a minority of Syrians led to such population increases that the once village was elevated to city status on 8 January 1890.

== 20th century ==
- 1906 - The Jornal A Paz was founded.
- 1910 – 10 June: The Naval Restroom was inaugurated.
- 1916 – Everard Barreto de Andrade is considered the formally appointed mayor, nominated by Nilo Peçanha.
- 1912 – The Ypu Factory was inaugurated.
- 1913 – Galdino do Valle Filho was elected president of the City Council.
- 1922 – The election was scheduled.
- 1923 – Galdino do Valle Filho is considered the first mayor elected by direct vote in Nova Friburgo
- 1935 – The old city hall was inaugurated in June 1935, replacing the building of 1873.
- 1937 – The Hans Gaiser (Haga) Hardware Factory set up operations in the city.
- 1945 – Prohibition of gambling in Brazil, affecting Hotel Cassino and others casinos.
- 1950's:
  - The Olaria neighborhood expanded rapidly as the main working-class neighborhood at the time.
- 1960:
  - The population of Nova Friburgo was more than 70,000.
  - In February 1960, the city temporarily became the symbolic capital of the state of Rio de Janeiro.
- 1970: The population of Nova Friburgo was estimated at 90,420.
- 1980's
  - The textile industry is facing a severe crisis, and countless factories are closing their doors.
  - The St. John the Baptist Cathedral was designated a heritage site by the city of Nova Friburgo and the state of Rio de Janeiro, receiving its listing from INEPAC.
- 1990 – The first edition of the Nova Friburgo Lingerie Fair (Fevest) was launched.
- 1991 – 1995: The city's rural areas, particularly the district of Riograndina, endured years of terror due to the barbaric crimes committed by the brothers Ibraim and Henrique de Oliveira. The dramatic police manhunt mobilized the BOPE and ended with Ibraim's death in 1995.
- 2000 – The population of Nova Friburgo was estimated at 173,418.

== 21st century ==
- Early 2000s – Until the early 2000s, the historic buildings on Getúlio Vargas Square still housed the city’s courthouse, which was later moved to Euterpe Friburguense Avenue.
- 2004 – The former courthouse building was renovated by the Rio de Janeiro Court of Justice to house election offices and provide space for City Hall.
- 2008 – The Laércio Ventura Municipal Theater opened in September 2008.
- 2010 – The population of Nova Friburgo was estimated at 182,082.
- 2011 – The city was one of the areas most affected by the 2011 floods.
- 2018 – Nova Friburgo celebrated the 200th anniversary of its founding on May 16, 2018.
- 2020 – The municipality imposed lockdowns during the COVID-19 pandemic.
- 2021 – Nova Friburgo celebrates its 203nd anniversary with concerts streamed live online.
- 2022 – the population was estimated at 189,939 inhabitants.
- 2024 – Johnny Maycon was re-elected by Partido Liberal.
- 2025 – As of early August, 440 traffic accidents had been reported.
- 2026:
  - In July 08, the Usina Viva Project returns to Nova Friburgo with a free program featuring culture and artificial intelligence.
  - In July 16, Nova Friburgo records the fifth-lowest temperature in Brazil and tops the state rankings.
  - July 17 and August 2: The 2026 SESC Winter Festival will take place from July 17 to August 2. The main bands and artists performing at the event are: Cidade Negra, Barão Vermelho, Detonautas, Paula Fernandes, Adriana Calcanhotto, Xande de Pilares and Joanna.
  - A group of protesters in Getúlio Vargas Square in October 13, 2026
    October 8 and October 13, a pro-Lula demonstration took place, involving college students, and the march went from Getúlio Vargas Square to Nova Friburgo City Hall.

== See also ==
- List of mayors of Nova Friburgo
- History of Nova Friburgo
