= Nova Friburgo (district) =

- City district
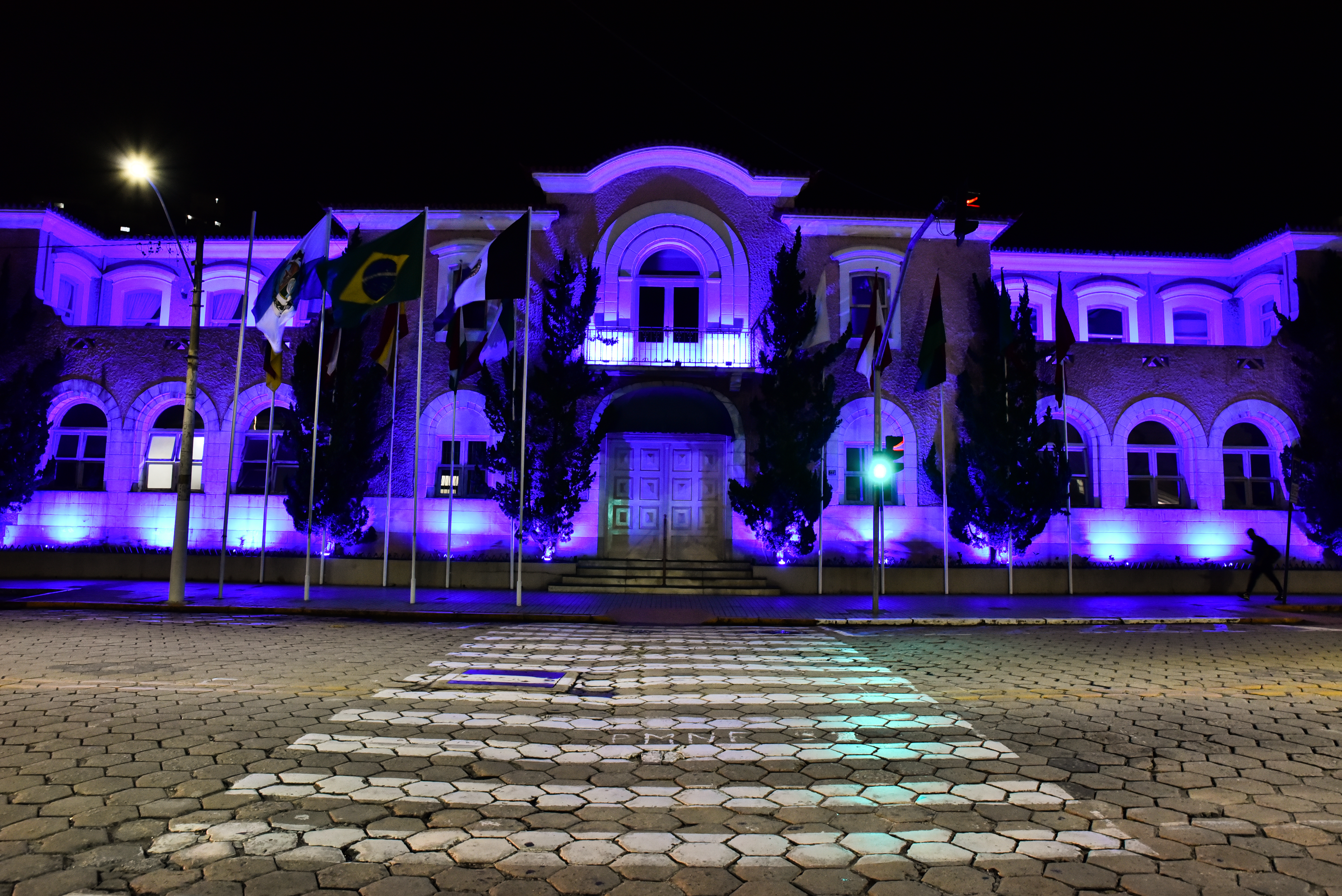
- Nova Frburgo City Hall
- Interactive map of Nova Friburgo
- Coordinates: 22°16′49.64″S 42°31′56.88″W
- Country: Brazil
- State: Rio de Janeiro
- City: Nova Friburgo

The Nova Friburgo District is the first district of the Brazilian municipality of Nova Friburgo, in the mountainous region of the state of Rio de Janeiro. The district consists of 27 neighborhoods. In 2022, the population was estimated at 104 787 inhabitants.

== Geography ==
The biome of Nova Friburgo District is the Atlantic Forest.

== Demography ==
In 2022, the population was estimated at 104 787 inhabitants according to the census conducted that year by the Brazilian Institute of Geography and Statistics (IBGE).

== Economy ==
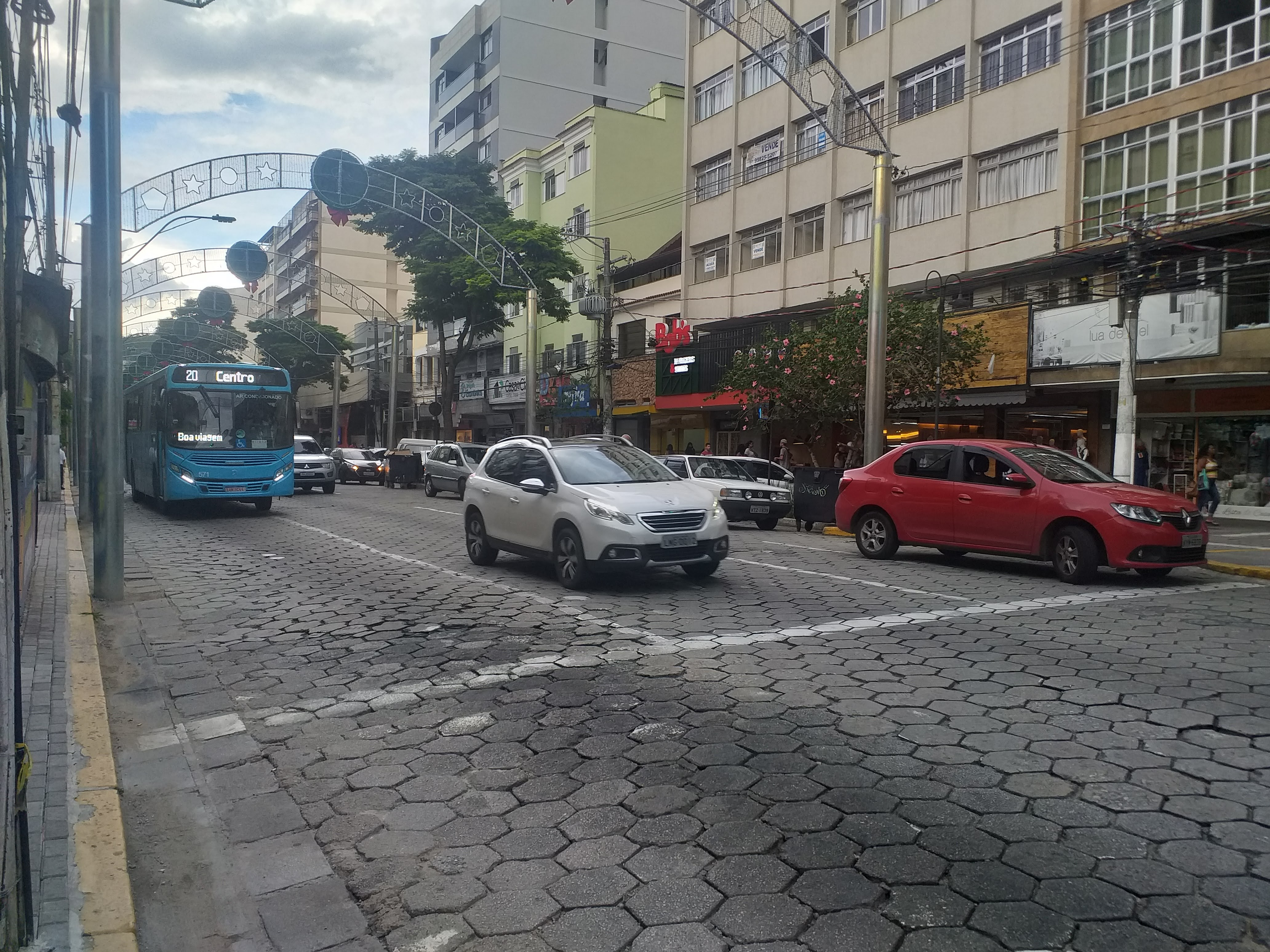
Avenue Alberto Braune, in the center of Nova Friburgo in 2024

The city’s main commercial and economic hub is Alberto Braune Avenue, renowned as a hub for shopping, businesses, banks and bustling activity. The avenue is home to the city’s highest concentration of shops.

One of the main shopping centres is Cadima Shopping, located in the city centre; it is one of the busiest in the region and opened in 1998. It is home to major retailers and brands such as Lojas Americanas, Casa e Video, Renner, Burger King, Cacau Show, Giraffas and Subway. Another shopping centre is Friburgo Shopping, located in the same district and opened in 1997. It houses major retailers and brands such as McDonald’s, Bob’s and Burger King.

== Transports ==
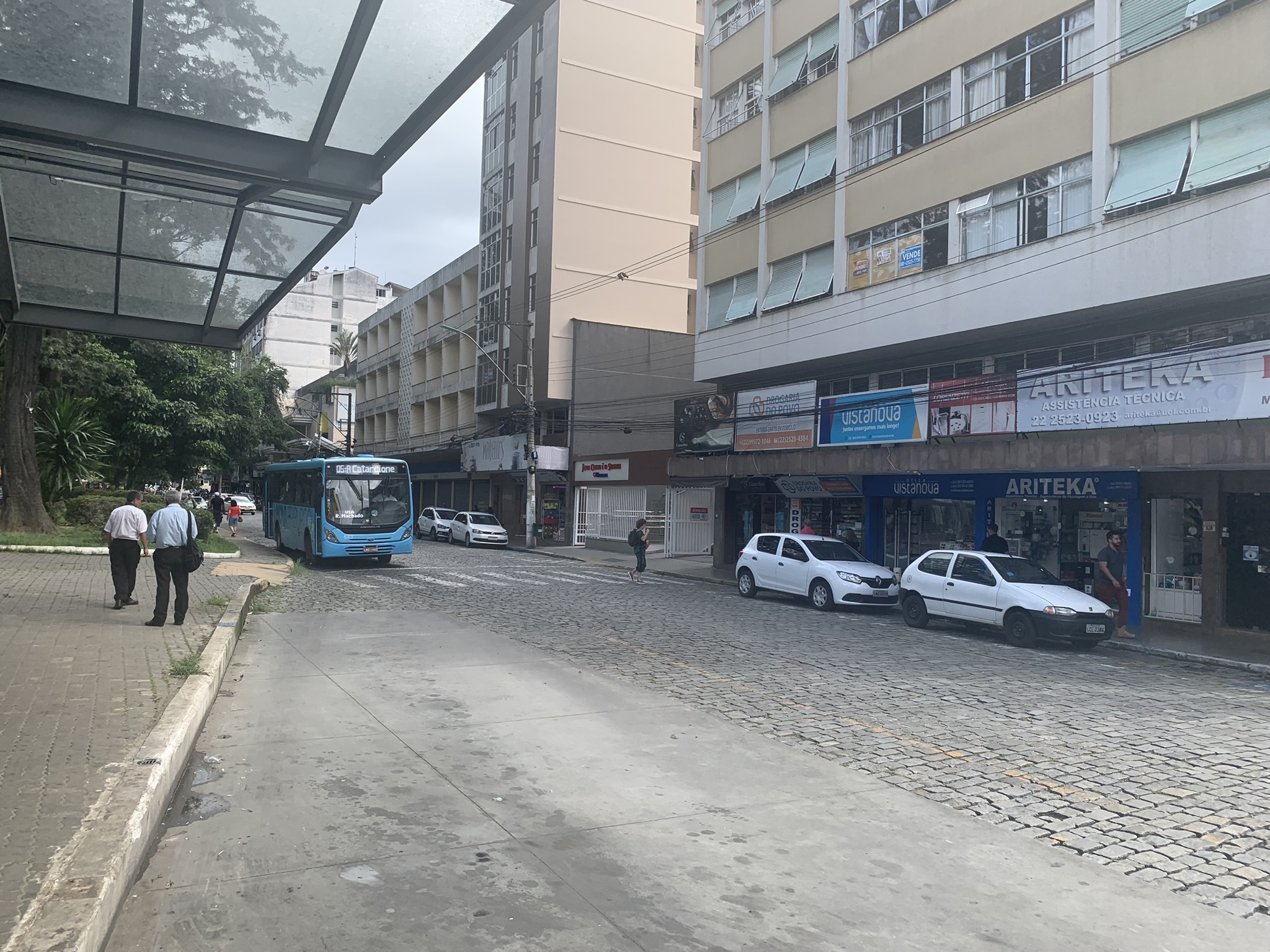
Bus Station of FAOL

The district seat is home to the NovaFaol bus terminal, located in the city center. There is also the old city bus station, now called Estação Livre, which serves the city with both urban and rural bus routes.

== Tourism ==
St. John the Baptist Cathedral in 2026

The main tourist attractions in the district seat are:

- Demerval Barbosa Moreira Square
- Getúlio Vargas Square
- Suspiro Square
- Nova Friburgo Country Clube
- St. John the Baptist Cathedral

== Neighborhoods ==
The Nova Friburgo district has 27 neighborhoods, with the Olaria neighborhood being the most populous in both the district and the city.

== See also ==
- Nova Friburgo
