= Culture of Nova Friburgo =

The cultue of Nova Friburgo, Brazilian municipality in the state of Rio de Janeiro, reflects a rich blend of traditions brought by Swiss settlers and Brazilian influences.

== Tourist attractions ==
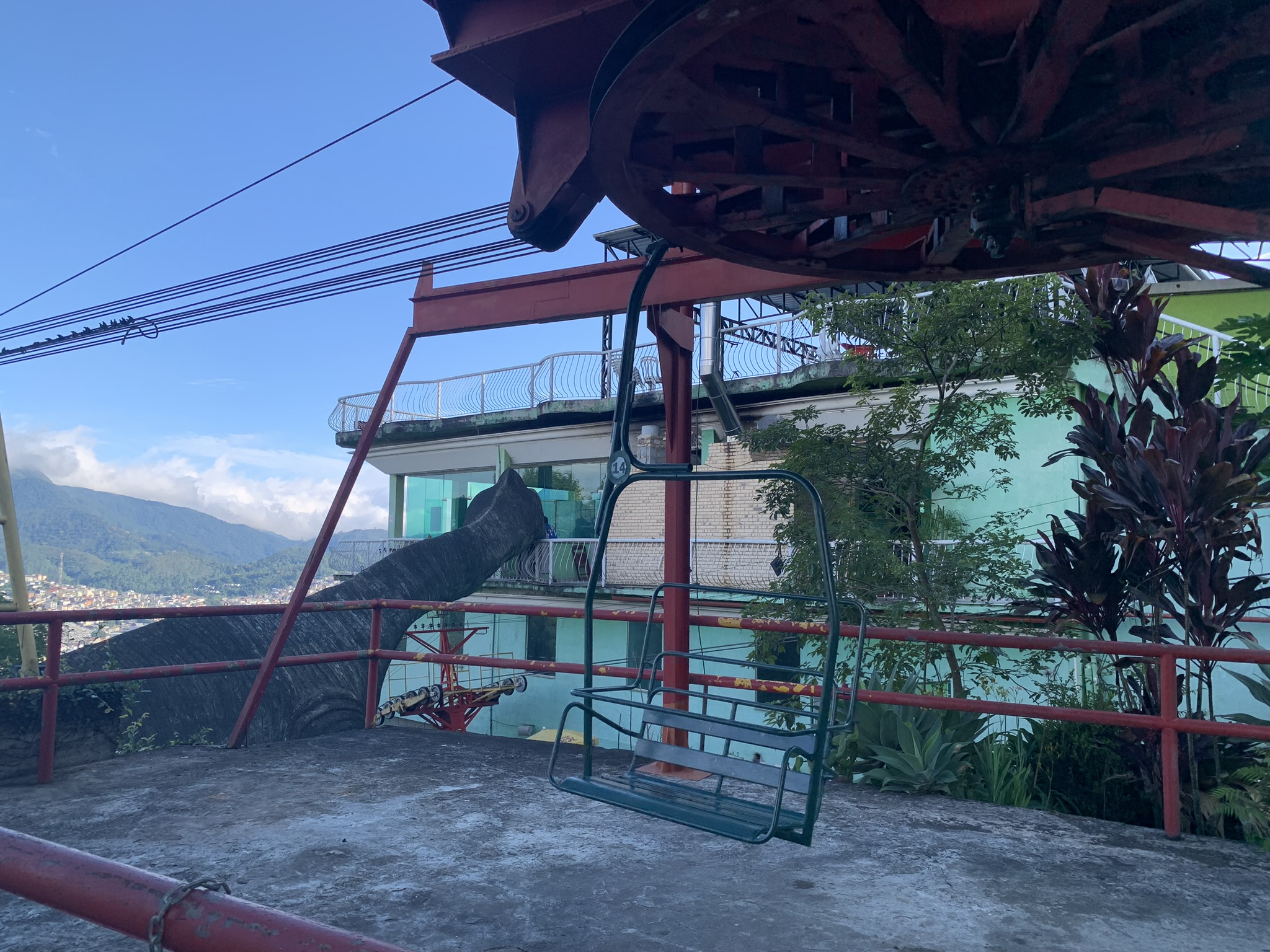
Suspiro Cable car

The city’s main tourist attractions are: Suspiro Cable car, Cão Sentado, Getúlio Vargas Square, Swiss Chocolaterie, among others.

=== City squares ===
- Getúlio Vargas Square
- Demerval Barbosa Moreira Square
- Suspiro Square
- Marcílio Dias Square

== Sports ==
The city excels in various sports, such as: rafting, canoeing, soccer, trekking and mountaineering.

=== The city's soccer teams ===
- Friburguense Atlético Clube
- Nova Friburgo Futebol Clube

== Museums ==
Nova Friburgo has somes museums, among them Jardim do Nêgo, Casa Suiça and Museu do Mel. The first museum of Nova Friburgo is the Fundação D. João VI, located in downtown Nova Friburgo.

== Theaters ==
Laércio Ventura Municipal Theater at night

Nova Friburgo has only one municipal theater, namely the Laércio Ventura Municipal Theater, opened in September 2008.

== Restaurants ==
Nova Friburgo offers something to suit all tastes and styles: Arabic, Brazilian, Italian, Japanese and Portuguese cuisine, amongst others.

== See also ==
- Culture of Brazil
