= List of mayors of Nova Friburgo =

Mayor of Nova Friburgo
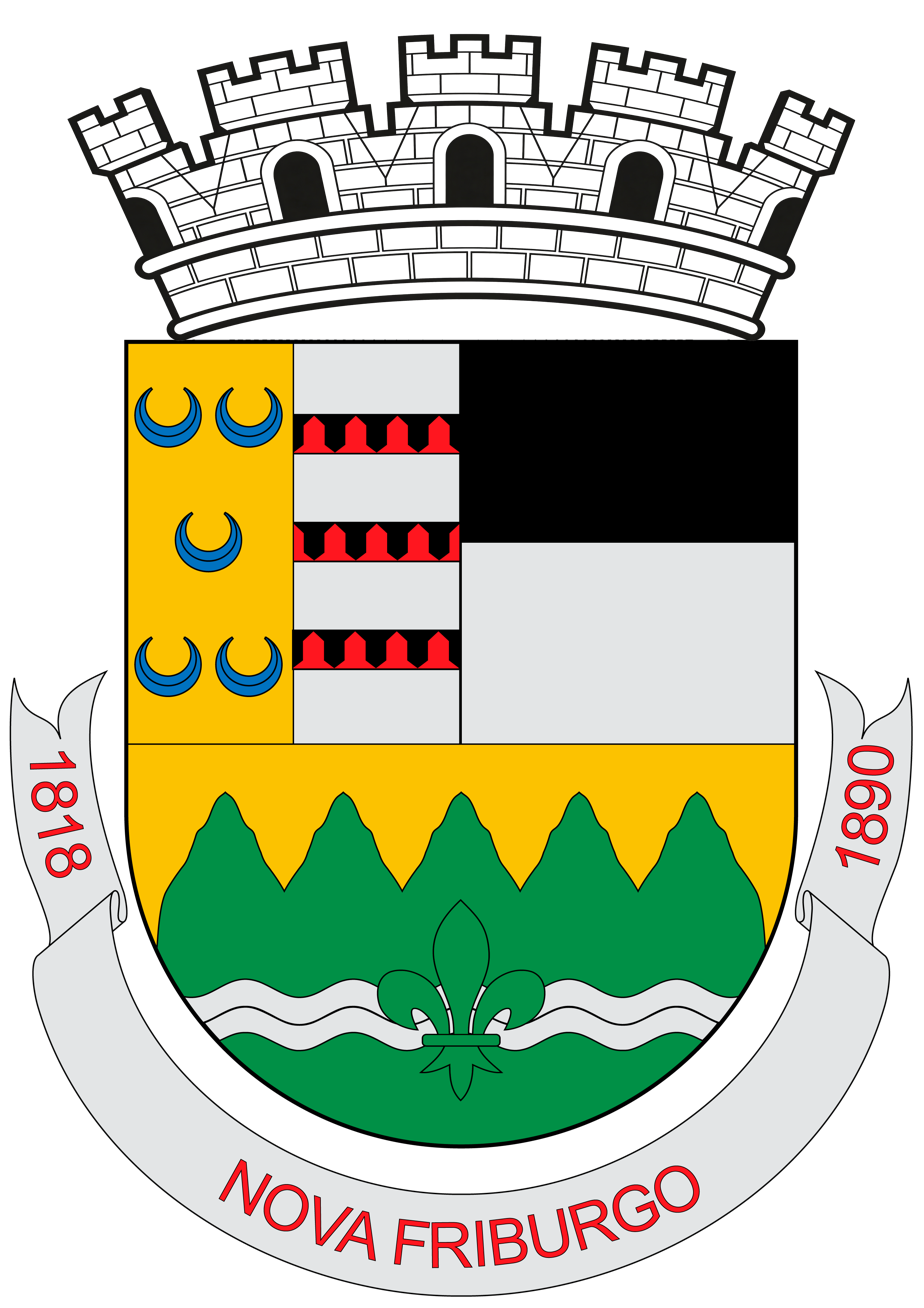

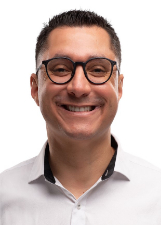
- Incumbent; Johnny Maycon
- Term length: Four years, renewable once
- Inaugural holder: Everard Barreto de Andrade
- Formation: 1916
- Deputy: Rodrigo Ascoly
- Website: https://www.pmnf.rj.gov.br

The following is a list of mayors of the city of Nova Friburgo, in the state of Rio de Janeiro, Brazil.

- Galdino do Valle Filho (1913–1916)
- Everard Barreto de Andrade (1916–1917)
- Sílvio da Fontoura Rangel (1917–1918)
- Gustavo Lira da Silva (1919–1922)
- Galdino do Valle Filho (1923–1923)
- Carlos Baltazar da Silveira (1923–1923)
- Plácido Lopes Martins (1923–1924)
- Antonio Segadas Viana (1924–1924)
- Décio Ferreira de Souza (1924–1924)
- Antonio Segadas Viana (1924–1924)
- Francisco Celestino Berçot (1924–1924)
- Joaquim José Antunes (1924–1926)
- Luiz Augusto Mury (1926–1926)
- Joaquim José Antunes (1926–1927)
- Galdino do Valle Filho (1927–1927)
- Carlos Baltazar da Silveira (1927–1929)
- Arnaldo Pinheiro Bittencourt (1929–1930)
- Government Junta (José Galiano das Neves and Carlos Alberto Braune)
- José de Souza Miranda (1930–1932)
- Hugo Floriano da Mota (1932–1935)
- Dante Laginestra (1935–1946)
- César Guinle (1947–1951)
- José Eugênio Müller (1951–1955)
- Feliciano da Costa (1955–1959)
- Amâncio Mário de Azevedo (1959–1963)
- Amadeu Villa (1962–1962)
- Vanor Tassara Moreira (1963–1964)
- Heródoto Bento de Mello (1964–1967)
- Joaquim Sydnei Soares (1965–1965)
- Amâncio Mário de Azevedo (1967–1971)
- Feliciano da Costa (1971–1973)
- Amâncio Mário de Azevedo (1973–1977)
- Feliciano da Costa (1977–1983)
- Heródoto Bento de Mello (1983–1988)
- Paulo Azevedo (1989–1992)
- Nelci da Silva (1993–1994)
- Heródoto Bento de Mello (1994–1996)
- Paulo Azevedo (1997–2000)
- Saudade Braga (2001–2004)
- Saudade Braga (2005–2008)
- Heródoto Bento de Mello (2009–2010)
- Sérgio Xavier (2011–2012)
- Rogério Cabral (2013–2016)
- Renato Bravo (2017–2020)
- Johnny Maycon (2021–2024)
- Johnny Maycon (2024-present)

== External link ==
- Nova Friburgo City Hall
