= Street theatre =

Form of theatrical performance

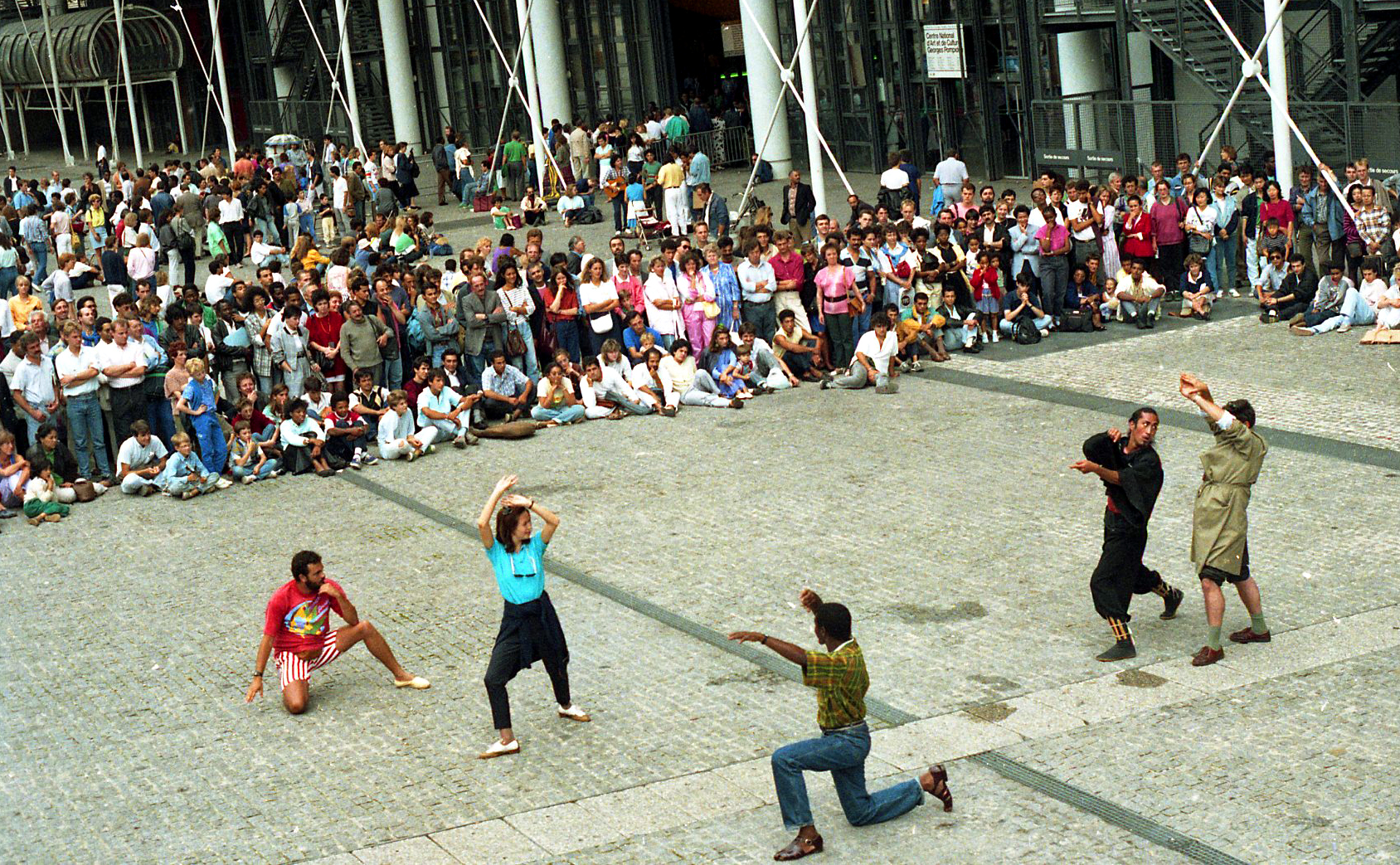
Street theatre outside the Centre Pompidou in Paris

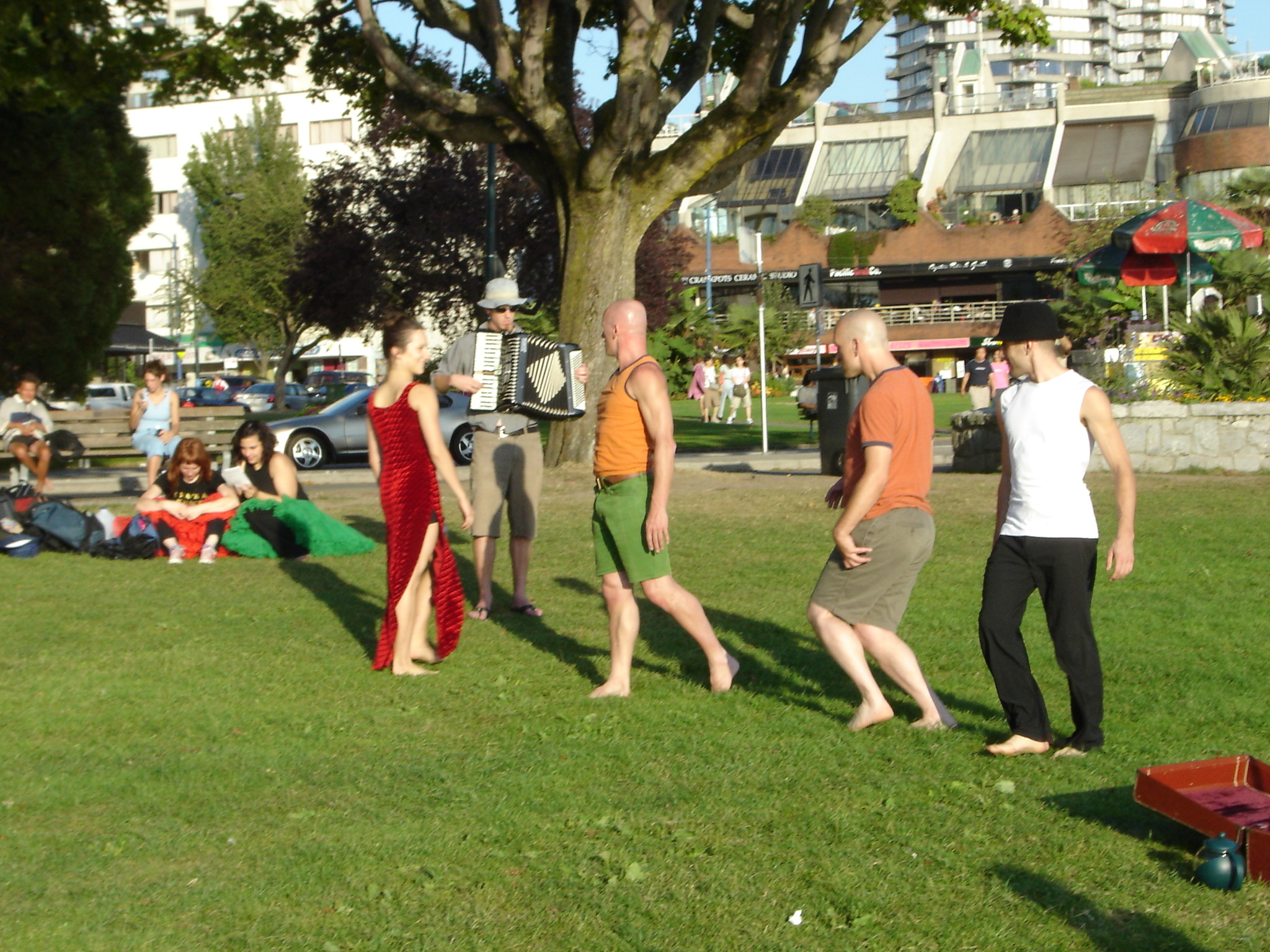
A troupe of street theatre performers by the beach in Vancouver, British Columbia, Canada.

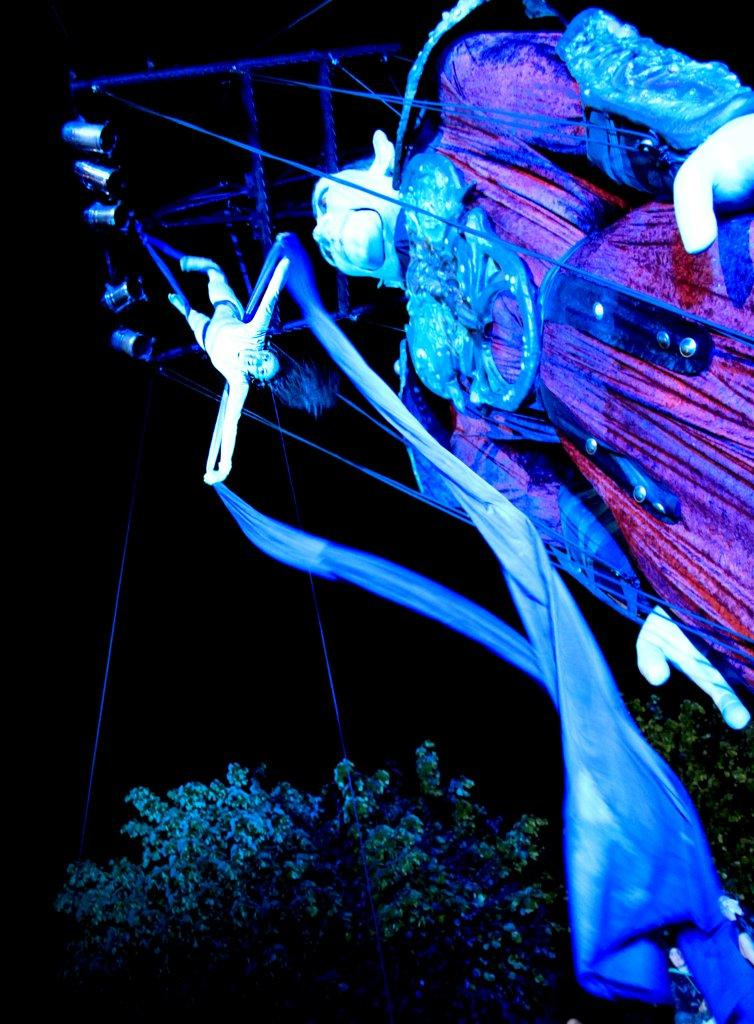
Acrobatics over Salvador: La Marioneta Gigante by Spanish company Carros de foc

Street theatre is a form of theatrical performance and presentation in outdoor public spaces without a specific paying audience. These spaces can be anywhere, including shopping centres, car parks, recreational reserves, college or university campus and street corners. They are especially seen in outdoor spaces where there are large numbers of people. Performers range from buskers to organised theatre companies, with the purpose of experimenting with performance spaces, promoting their mainstream work, or being commissioned for events such as street festivals, children's shows, or parades.

The logistics of doing street theatre necessitate simple costumes and props, and often there is little or no amplification of sound, with actors depending on their natural vocal and physical ability. This makes physical theatre, including dance, mime and slapstick, a very popular genre in an outdoor setting. The performances need to be highly visible, loud and simple to follow in order to attract a crowd.

Street theatre is distinguished from other more formal outdoor theatrical performances, such as performances in a park or garden, in that there is no discrete space set aside (or roped off) and a ticketed audience.

In some cases, street theatre performers have to get a licence or specific permission through local or state governments in order to perform. Many performers travel internationally to certain locations.

Street theatre is arguably the oldest form of theatre in existence: most mainstream entertainment mediums can be traced back to origins in street performing, including religious passion plays and many other forms. More recently, performers who would have made their living working in variety theatres, music halls and in vaudeville now often perform professionally in the many well-known street performance areas throughout the world. Notable performers that began their careers as street theatre performers include Robin Williams, David Bowie, Jewel and Harry Anderson.

Street theatre is a way to make traditional theatre accessible for those who may not be able to otherwise attend or afford tickets. The audience typically consists of anyone and everyone who wants to watch, and most performances are free public entertainment.

== Reasons for staging work on the street ==
Performance artists with an interest in social activism may choose to stage their work on the street as a means of directly confronting or engaging the public. For example, multimedia artist Caeser Pink and his group of performers known as The Imperial Orgy staged a piece titled Our Daily Bread that brought performers onto the streets of the New York's financial district to ceremoniously lay loaves of Wonder Bread along the sidewalks, each with an advertisement from Satan offering to buy people's souls in exchange for material possessions. The performance caused an uproar when police were called out and bomb-sniffing dogs were brought in to inspect the loaves of bread for explosives.

Other artists consider a paying, theatre-going public to be unrepresentative of the public to whom they are trying to communicate, and performing to 'the man on the street' may be considered a more democratic form of dissemination.

Some contemporary street theatre practitioners have extensively studied pre-existing street and popular theatre traditions, such as Carnival, commedia dell'arte etc. and wish to present them in a situation close to their original context.

Whatever the reason for choosing the street, the street is a place with a different set of possibilities than the conventional theatre space. Sue Gill of Welfare State International argues that a street theatre performance is not a lesser form than an indoor performance, nor is it simply taking what you do on stage and placing it outdoors, but a form with an energy and an integrity of its own.

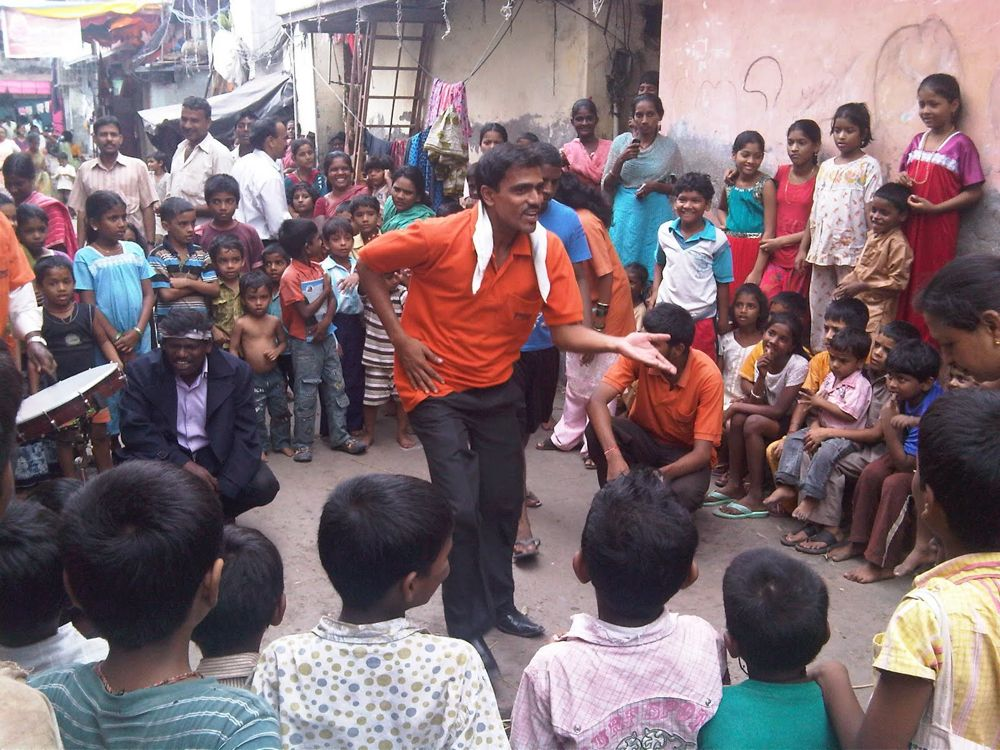
A street play (nukkad natak) in Dharavi slums in Mumbai

Many companies are politically motivated and use street theatre to combine performance with protest. This has occurred through the guerrilla theatre of San Francisco Mime Troupe, The Living Theatre, the carnivalesque parades of Bread and Puppet Theatre, and the work of Ashesh Malla and the Sarwanam Theatre Group of Nepal.

A character-based street theatre which developed in the 1960s and 1970s was developed by groups like Lumiere and Son, John Bull Puncture Repair Kit, Exploded Eye and Natural Theatre Company. The performances were unannounced and featured characters who acted out a pre-arranged scenario, looking beautiful or surreal or simply just involving passers by in conversation. They did not seek to trick in a Candid Camera way, but rather invited the audience to pretend along with them. No amount of planning or rehearsal could dictate what would happen.

Another example would be Natural Theatre's Pink Suitcase scenario. A number of smartly dressed people carrying bright pink suitcases enter a set of streets or buildings. They search for and miss their companions. In their search they get on buses, hail cabs, end up in shop windows, etc. By the time they meet up at a pre-arranged spot with the help of passers-by, perceptions of the area have changed and shopping has ceased for at least a few moments. The humour is universal and this piece has been seen in nearly seventy countries. It is usually performed by four or five actors, but has been done with twenty-five.

== Interactive street theatre ==
Interactive street theatre is a combination of two separate art forms, street theatre and interactive art.

Unlike other interactive art, the presentation of interactive street theatre is outside in a public place and most of the time at festivals. The audience of interactive street theatre consists of passers-by who stop to participate on a voluntary basis. The nature of this type of performance is temporary, generally lasting only a few hours, and is considered much more accessible and easier to participate in than in a gallery or a museum, as those who might not have ever been to a theatre or museum can participate in interactive street theatre.

Some interactive art installations allow visitors to walk in, on, and around them, or allow them to play with the object of the installations. Another way interactive theatre is done is that spectators themselves become part of the artwork. There are also types of interactive street theatre where that spectator becomes an active part of the show and works together with the artist to create a magnificent collective art piece.

=== Peru ===
In Peru, interactive street theatre was used to raise awareness of the many misconceptions of family planning and use of contraceptives. The play "Ms. Rumors" was performed as a means of promoting a much greater understanding of information regarding contraceptives and planned parenthood. The play told the audience the truth about contraceptives through the character of a pharmacist, which in turn contradicted the false claims that the character Ms.Rumors suggested. The play lasted around four months and was around twenty minutes long. The performance was followed by a forum to discuss any questions the audience had about parent planning, which worked better than private counselling since people would have the support of their peers, and the answers would educate the entire group. The play "Ms. Rumors" focused on the information that is usually misrepresented regarding birth control pills or "the pill". One of the rumours about birth control pills is that they can cause side effects such as cancer, which is false. The public play was placed in the city plazas and also outside of hospitals and clinics where people are possibly going to receive information regarding parent planning and contraceptives. The significance of this play was that it promoted safe sex information that protects against unwanted pregnancies or sexually transmitted diseases that can be caused by unprotected sex. It educated the public on misinformation such as condoms being uncomfortable, contraceptives causing abortions, and many other misconceptions that were made up due to lack of knowledge on contraceptives and family planning.

=== South Africa ===
In South Africa, interactive street theatre was used to raise awareness of health issues such as AIDS or HIV and how certain behaviours promote the increase of the virus. Puppet shows were performed in the streets to educate the public of how deadly contracting AIDS or HIV virus is. The show consisted of the main character having AIDS and transmitting the disease to others, which ultimately led to the death of the character and the transmission of it to other people as well. Having these performances played in public will raise awareness to the deadly virus, that many people may not have had knowledge of. It educated the audience about risks, and how to avoid them with safer behaviours they could do to prevent contracting the virus. It also educated the viewers on different, and much safer behaviours to use in order to stop transmitting the virus to others. This awareness could work to increase the knowledge of the virus, and educate the public on methods to decrease the transmutation of the disease.

== See also ==
- Barn theatre
- Carros de foc
- Close-Act Theatre
- Freak show
- Medicine show
- One-Mensch-Theater
- Royal de luxe
- Sideshow
- Street musician
