= José Eugênio Müller =

Brazilian politician

Mayor of Nova Friburgo
- In office 28 March 1947 – 12 October 1947
- Appointed by: Macedo Soares
- Succeeded by: César Guinle
- In office 31 January 1951 – 28 October 1955
- Preceded by: César Guinle
- Succeeded by: Feliciano da Costa

Member of the Chamber of Deputies
- In office 1935–1937
- Constituency: Santa Catarina
- In office 1957 – December 1958
- Constituency: Rio de Janeiro

Personal details
- Born: 28 November 1889 Itajaí, Brazil
- Died: 3 May 1973 (aged 83) Rio de Janeiro, Brazil
- Party: Partido Evolucionista Brasileiro; Social Democratic
- Spouse: Maria Augusta Amaral
- Children: 5

José Eugênio Müller (28 November 1889 – 3 May 1973) was a Brazilian politician. He was twice a member of the Chamber of Deputies, first from Santa Catarina, then from Rio de Janeiro. He was also twice the mayor of Nova Friburgo, first by appointment by Macedo Soares from 28 March to 12 October 1947, then he was elected to the position and held it from 31 January 1951 to 28 October 1955.

== Life ==
He was born in Itajaí and was the son of Guilhermina Büchele and Eugênio Luís Müller, a politician from Santa Catarina.

He participated in the founding of the Aliança Liberal in Santa Catarina and aligned himself with Getúlio Vargas in the Revolution of 1930. He organized the 8th Battalion of Santa Catarina in support of the provisional government during the Constitutionalist Revolution of 1932. He was elected a member of the Chamber of Deputies for the state of Santa Catarina as a member of the Partido Evolucionista Brasileiro in 1934. He assumed office in 1935 and left when the National Congress was dissolved by Vargas in the 1937 Brazilian coup d'état.

Müller was appointed mayor of Novo Friburgo by Macedo Soares in 1947. He was later elected mayor of the city and held the position a second time from 1951 to 1955. He was the president of the State Bank of Rio de Janeiro from 1954 to 1957. In 1954, Müller was affiliated with the Social Democratic Party and ran for seat in the Chamber of Deputies as an alternate. He was later called upon to serve, and was a member of the Chamber of Deputies from Rio de Janeiro from 1957 to December 1958. He died 3 May 1973 in Rio de Janeiro.
