= Close-Act Theatre =

Street theatre company in the Netherlands

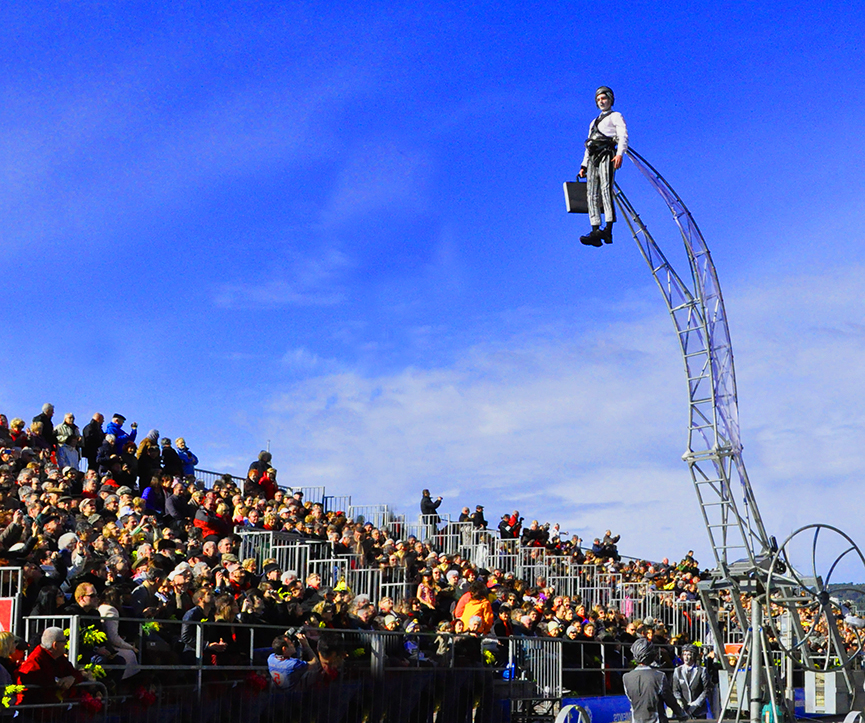
A performance of Convoi Exceptionnel

Close-Act Theatre is an international street theatre company that was founded in 1991 in the Netherlands. The group originates from collaboration of designers, actors, dancers, choreographers and musicians, all the disciplines are combined. Close-Act is a street theatre company where most of their performances are made for an audience of 5,000 to 10,000 people. The artistic directors of Close-Act are Hesther Melief and Tonny Aerts.

The group performed worldwide on festivals including the Daidogei World Cup, Klein Karoo National Arts Festival Oudsthoorn and Festival Internacional Cervantino.

== Productions ==
The group has many different productions. Their bigger spectacles have included Globe, Malaya, Pi-leau, Convoi Exceptionnel and Invasion.

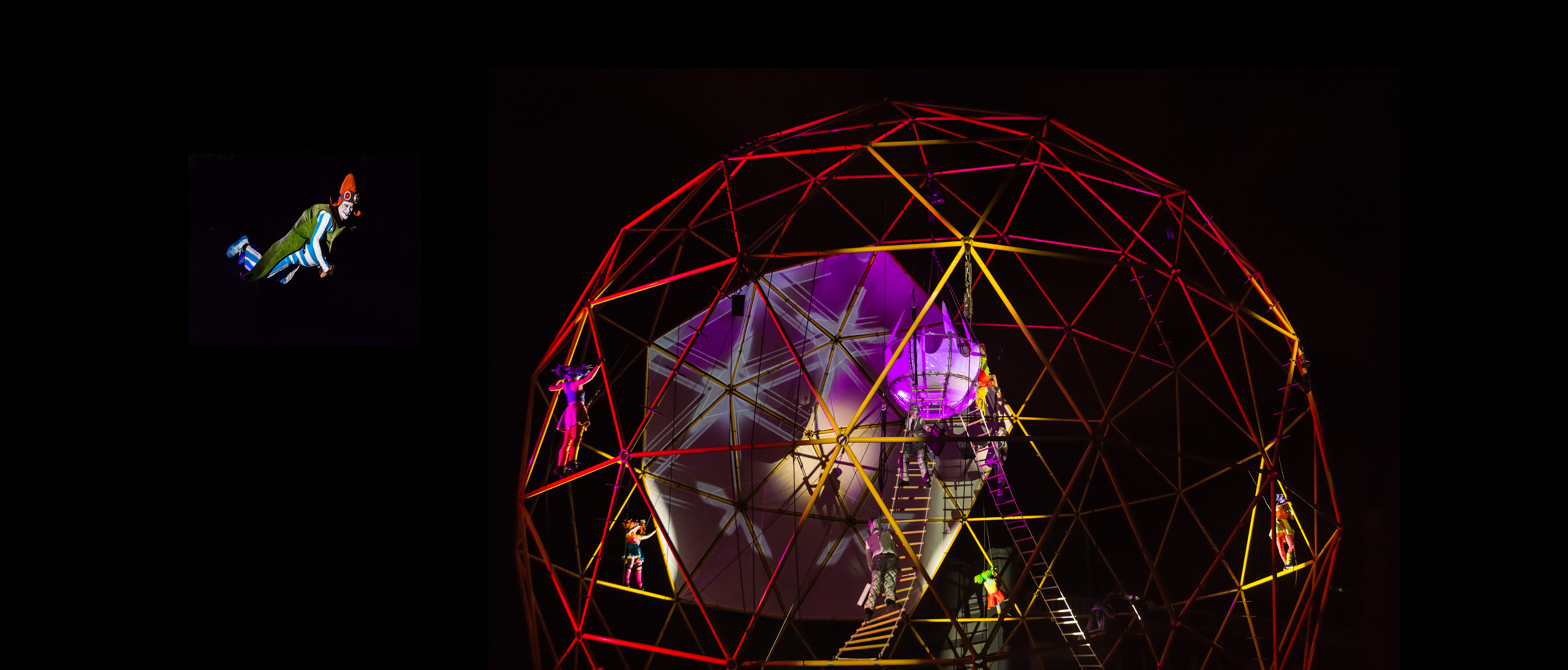
Globe

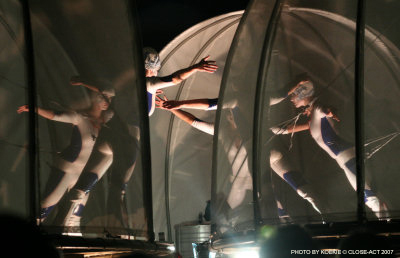
Pi-leau

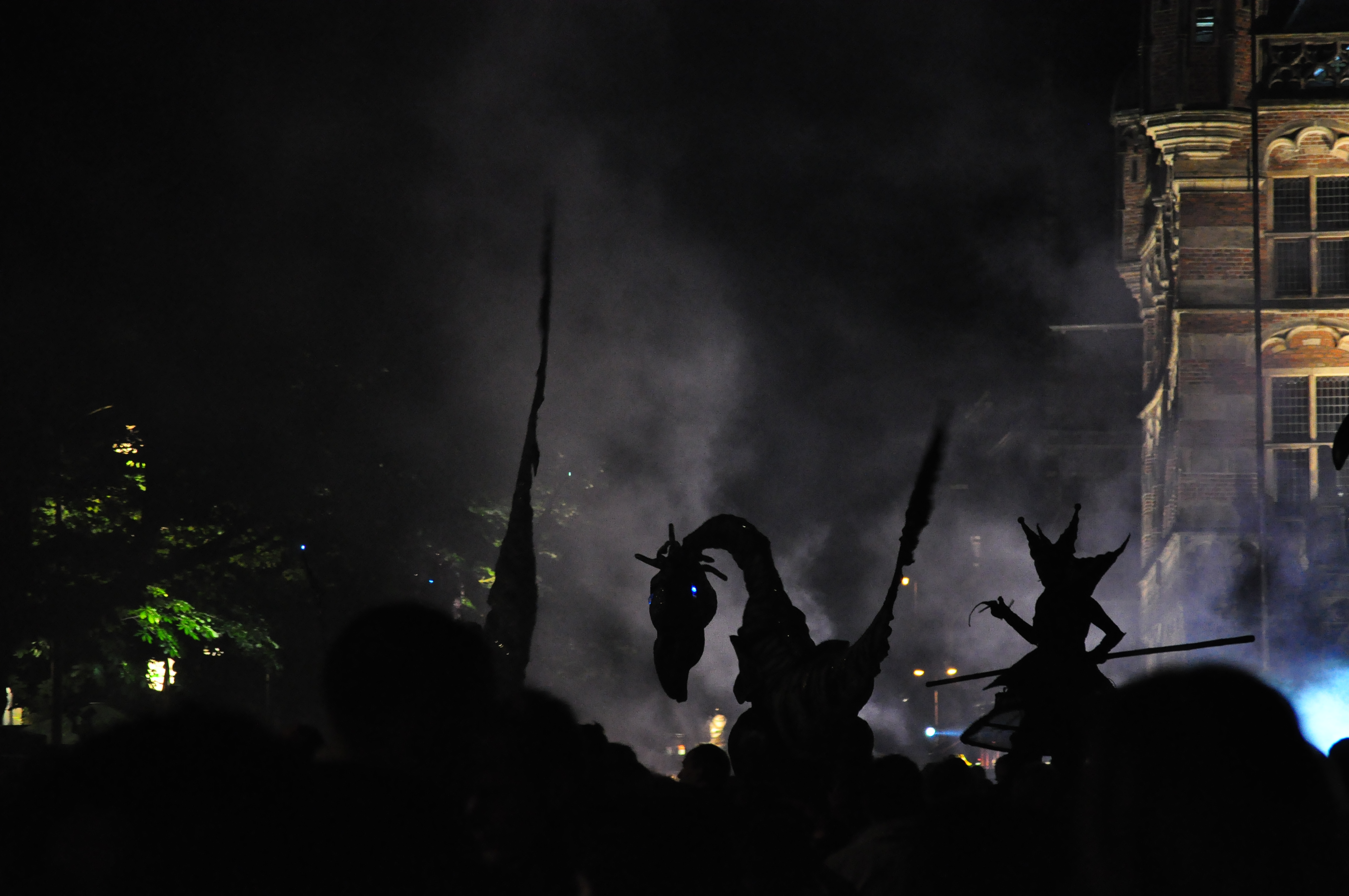
Invasion

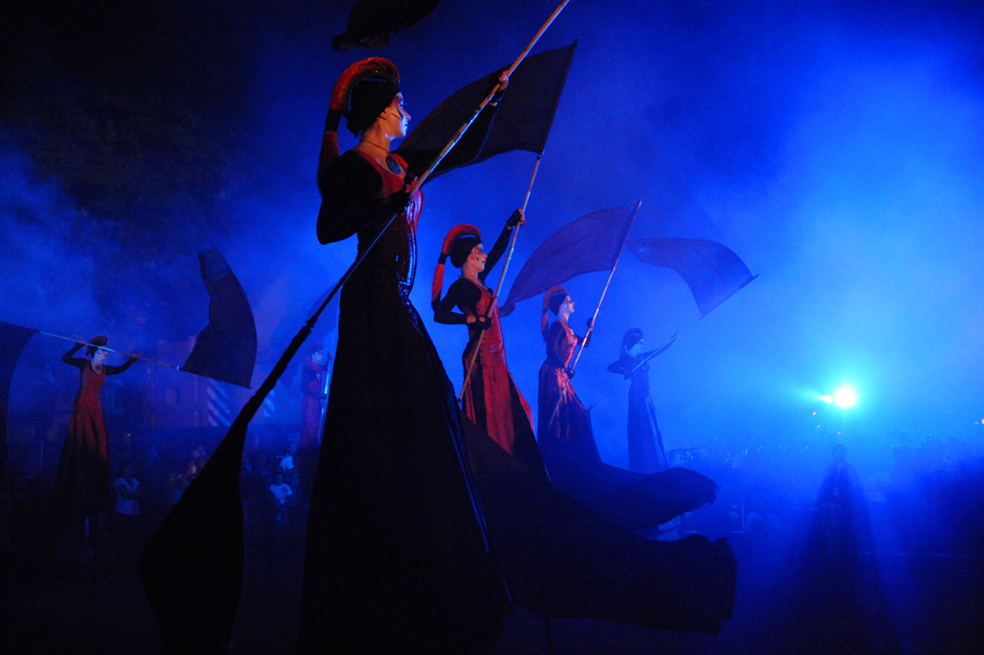
Actred
