= Carros de foc =

Street theater company

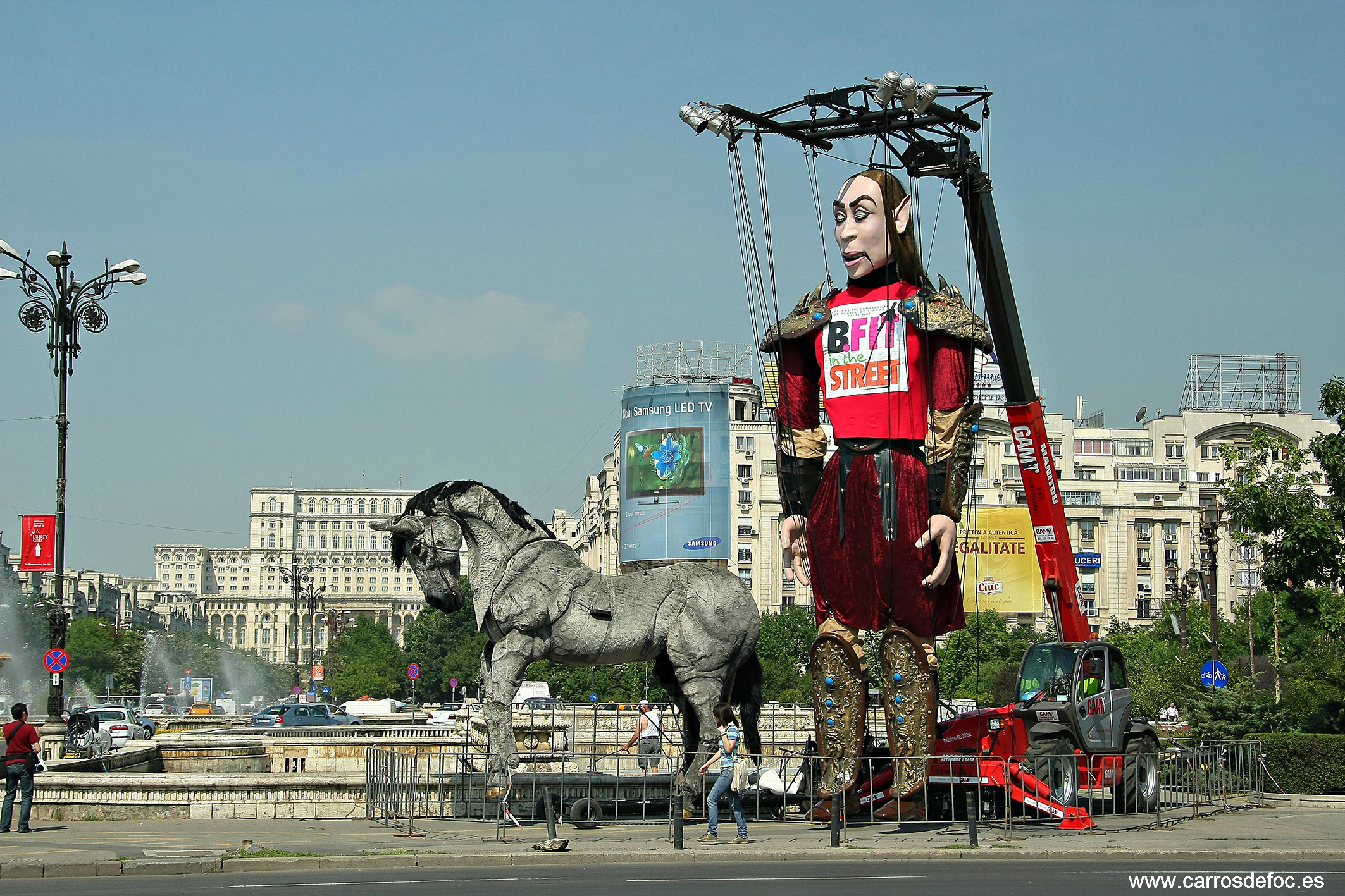
Salvador, La Marioneta Gigante in Bucharest, Romania

Carros de Foc is a street theater company with its headquarters in Alicante, Spain. The unique traits of their shows are the Giant Mobile Sculptures that are combined with different artistic disciplines in order to create surprising shows. The theatre company has represented Spain in different street theater festivals around Europe and Africa.

== History ==
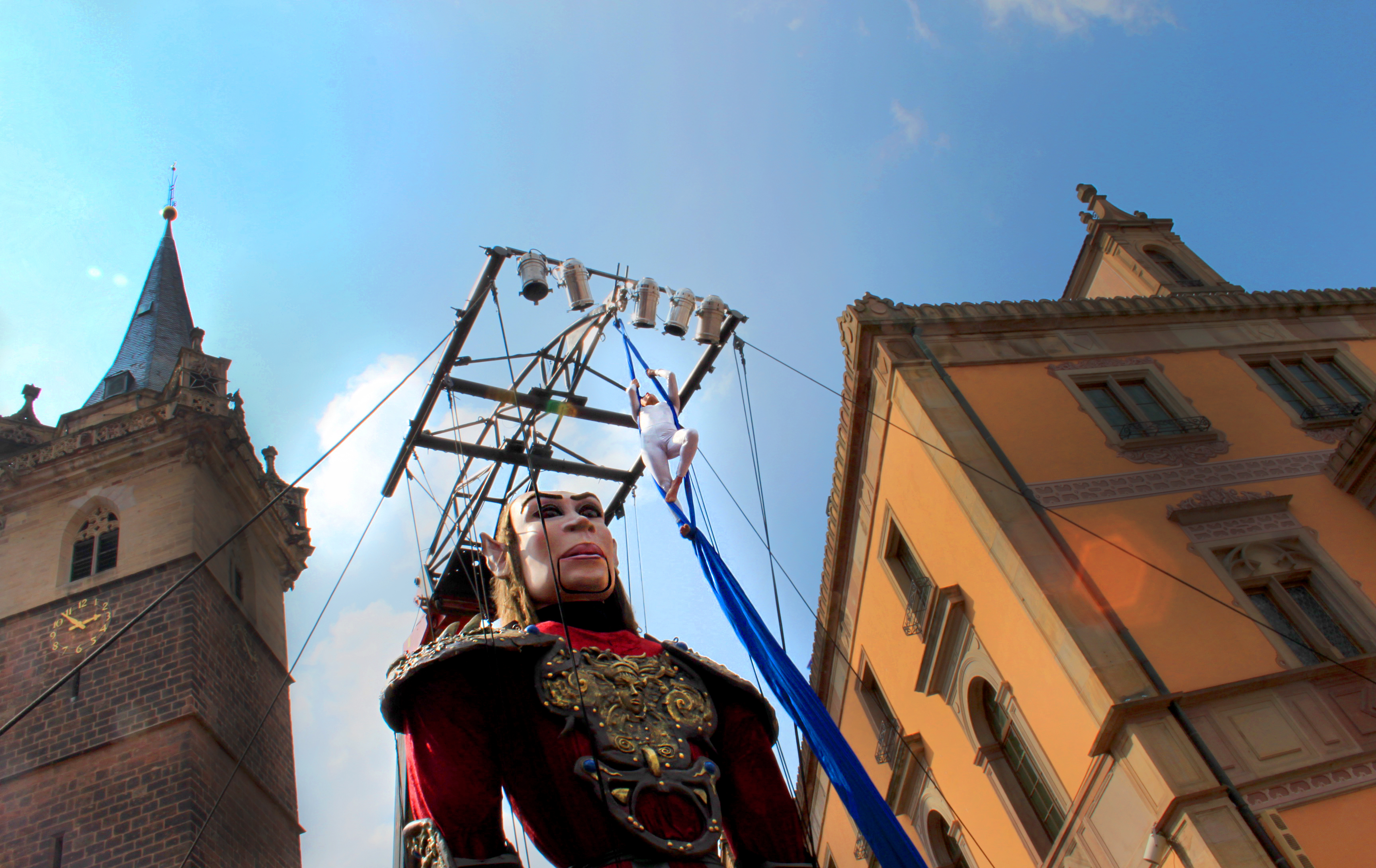
Salvador in Obernai, France

Founded by Miguel Ángel Martín Bordera, son of "falleros" of long tradition and renowned prestige, Carros de Foc has evolved from a street animation group towards a new urban theater concept away from the conventional. It is a Spanish Urban Theatre company whose philosophy in their works is to transport the audience into magic and fantastic atmospheres. They try to turn every urban space or event where they participate into a unique experience for the audience through a refined work with lighting effects, image and sounds. There is where The Giant Mobile Sculptures become important and join the other artistic disciplines, such as air acrobatics, rope choreographies or fire fans.

== Artistic concept ==
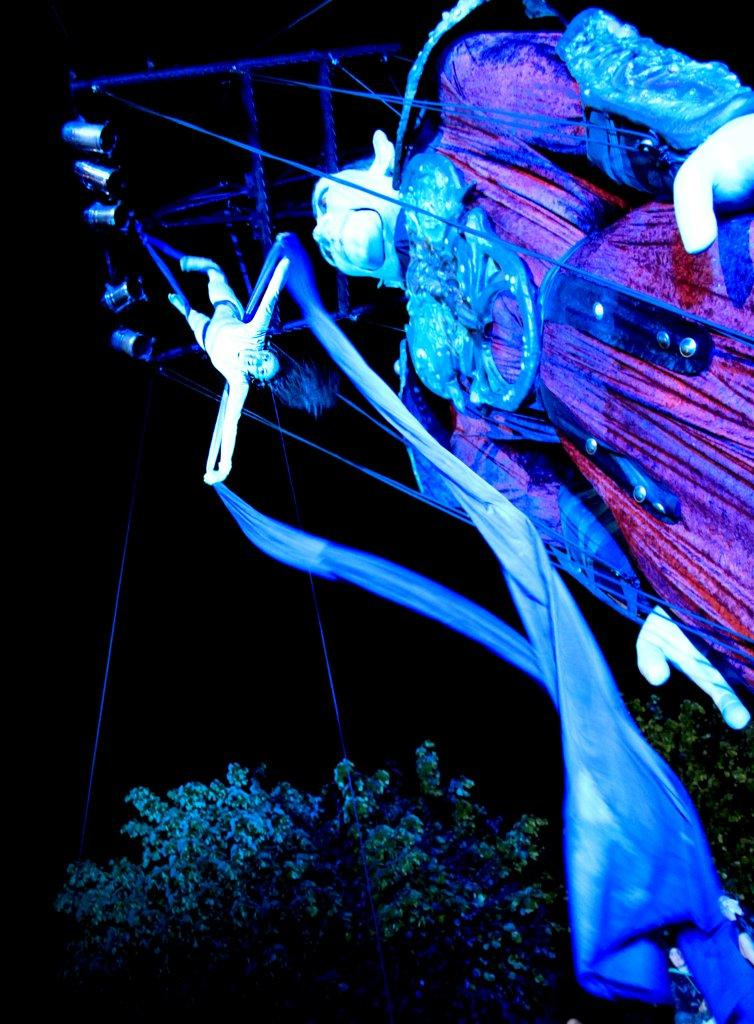
Acrobatics over Salvador, La Marioneta Gigante

Their shows combine different artistic disciplines such as air acrobatics, dance, hoop acrobatics, and theater performance with the Giant Mobile Sculptures. The Giant Mobile Sculptures are original creations which seem to come to life; they are jointed and provided with mobility, reaching 12 meters tall. Their realistic looks make them surprising and they represent animals or fantastic characters. The scenic design where the company structures their performances is both own designed and produced and is at exhibition's service in order to create a complete visual experience. The character's portrayal, the costumes and the body make up, which have latex details, are all combined to join the different artistic disciplines and be the core of their exhibitions, composing a nonpareil and creative force product.

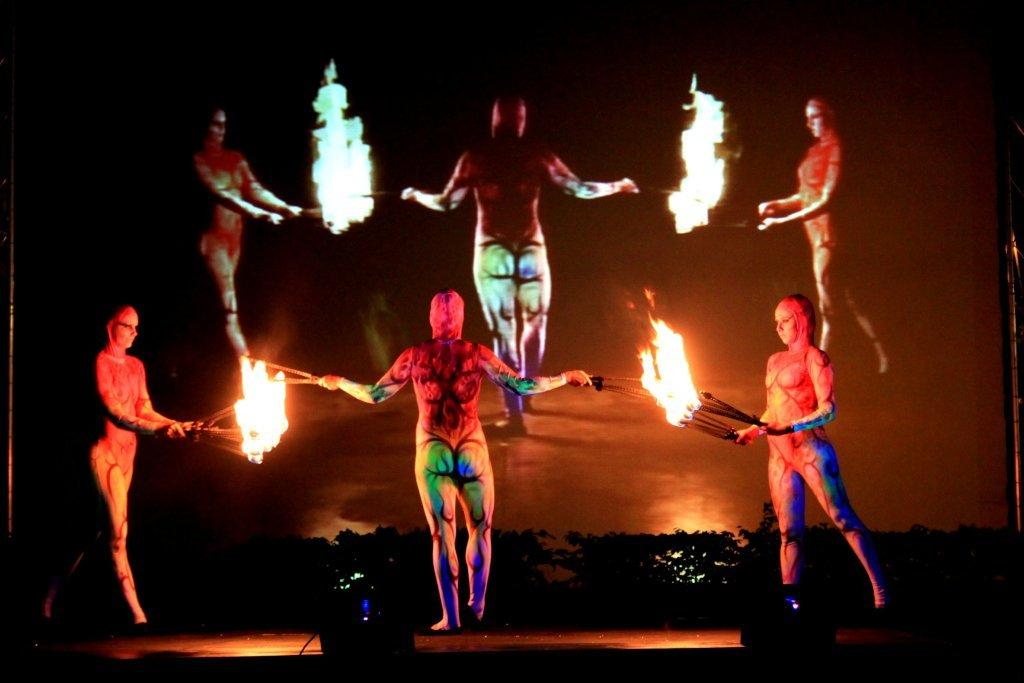
Fire juggling at "Natural Spirit" show

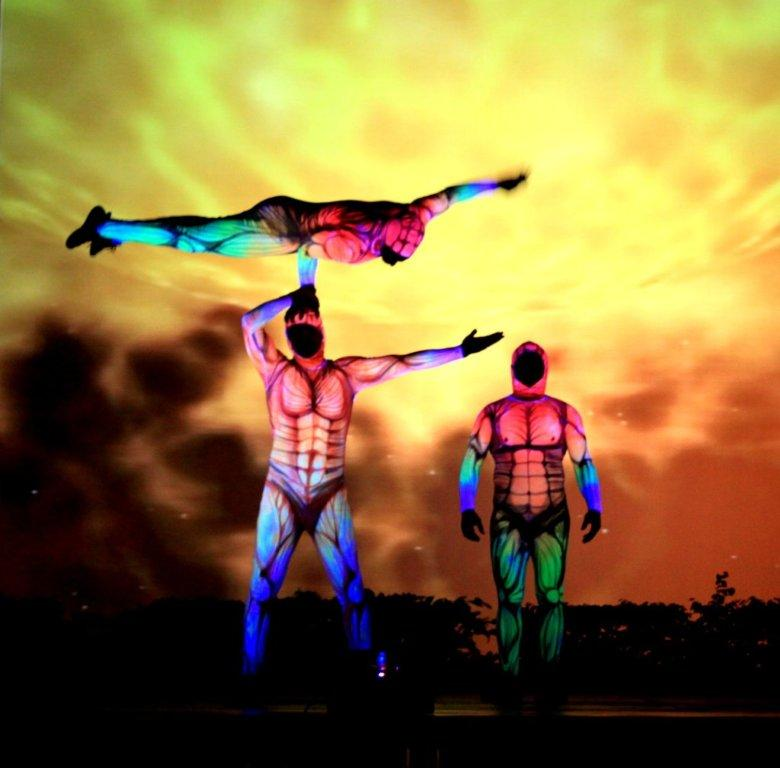
Acrobatics during "Natural Spirit"

== Shows ==
=== Large Format ===
- Natural Spirit. Salvador
- La Leyenda de los Pueblos Olvidados
- Dimonis
- Copernicus
- Lauca de la Fira

=== Medium Format ===
- Salvador, La Marioneta Gigante
- Águila Sophia
- Can Can Express
- El Druida de Jagul
- La Leyenda de los Pueblos Olvidados
- Natural Spirit (MF)
- Dimonis

=== Itinerant ===
- Adramelech
- Piratas
- Toro Viriato
- Ángel y Caballo Real
- Caballo Real in the forest
- Nemoris
- Una Tribu en tu ciudad
- Espejismo
- Euterpe
- Ocean Show
- Noche Mágica
- Universo
- Árbol Viviente
- El Santo Grial
- La Leyenda de los Pueblos Olvidados
- Dimonis
- Can Can Express
- El Druida de Jagul
- Mirage
- La Mangrana
- Paris Parade. Chile

=== A la carte Show ===
- San Jorge Cáceres 2011
- San Juan y San Pedro en Segovia
- Carnaval Romans
- Ciudad Deportiva Alaquas
- La Crida 2014 Fallas Valencia
- Fantasy in Katara
- Salvador in Segovia
- Salvador en Qingdao
- Salvador en Shanghai
- King Salvador in Changsha
- Monegros Desert Festival
- Three Kings Parade 2014. Madrid
- The Magic Box of letters
