= Miguel Ángel Martín Bordera =

Spanish artist

- Born: September 24, 1966 (age 59); Alicante, Spain
- Occupations: Artist, inventor, paintor
- Known for: Founder of Carros de foc
- Parent(s): Ángel Martín (1940); María Teresa Bordera (1940)

Miguel Ángel Martín Bordera is a Spanish artist born in Alicante in Spain on 24 September 1966. He is the founder and current director of the street theater company named Carros de foc.

== Origin and career ==
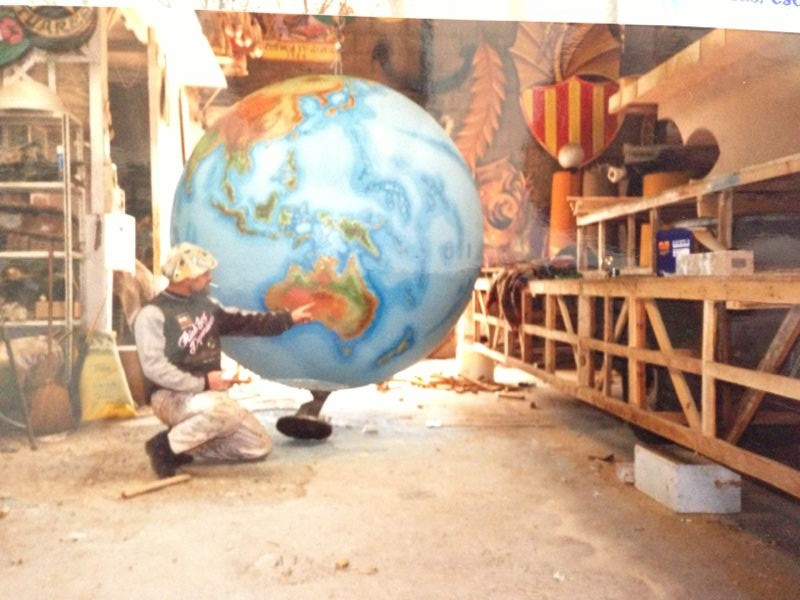
Modelling work for the scenic decoration of Miguel Angel

He was born in an artistic environment, his parents Angel Martin and María Teresa Bordera were painters and sculptors of in Alicante and contributed between 1960 and 1990, to the develop of the Sant Joan d´Alacant feast. They are noted as "Monumentos de Hogueras" builders.

Miguel Angel Martin, influenced by his parents, since he was very young, he started developing drawing and painting skills by copying works of Classic and Baroque authors like Fundación Gala-Salvador Dalí. Lately he was interested especially for the surrealistic tendency of Salvador Dalí, making him a visit in a trip of the Fundación Gala-Salvador Dalí in Figueras. Afterwards, studied marketing design, career that abandons to dedicate himself totally to the art.

In Angel Martin's workshop, he collaborates with Swedish artist Bengt Lindström in the reproduction of a series of sculptures applying the technic that he dominates for the reproduction of the Ninots in Hogueras de Alicante.

As of 80th decade he participates in different exhibitions, contests and plastic arts awards like the Winter Exhibition in Santa Barbara Castle, convened by Alicante's Council and in the first edition of the Painting Contest of San Vicente, getting the first award. Between 1984 and 1988 joins the group Pañés, sculpture and plastic expression group, formed by Pablo Ruiz Carretero and Ricardo Casal, he participates with them in the design of giant sculptures for a street exhibition. He works in the building of many "hogueras" of Alicante, "fallas" and floats, in the workshops of Pedro Soriano Moll, Ramón Marco Marco and Ángel Martín, obtaining many awards in the "Hogueras de San Juan de Alicante". He also works in the allegorical floats for the parades of the Alcoy celebrated in many locations like Alcoy.

In 1994, Miguel Angel Martin founded Carros de Foc. Since then as artistic director he has managed multitude street theatre projects along his more than 20 years of experience. His works have been able to be seen in different countries in the World like: Spain, Portugal, France, Italy, Netherlands, Romania, Morocco, China or Chile, where he has developed the creation, the design, the production and artistic management of itinerant street theater shows. Recently, in 2012 he was confided in Chile with the artistic management of the Paris Parade, with a total audience of 600.000 persons, in addition in more than 130.000 homes, the show was displayed through the TVN (National TV of Chile).

Miguel Angel Martin, has also represented Spain into different street theatre festivals like the 10th anniversary of the Mawazine Festival, the most important in Maghreb, celebrated in Rabat, in which he received the congratulation from the director of Instituto Cervantes of Rabat, Federico Arbós, Natural Spirit, work of Miguel Angel Martin, was the perfect closing in 2012, in the XXVII edition of the International Theatre Festival of Cadiz (FIT).

During 2012 to 2013 Miguel Angel Martin Bordera, develop projects of artistic directions in China representing his master piece the king Salvador, the giant marionette, in the cities of Shanghai, Shenyang, Taicang, Qingdao or Changsha.

Also his masterpieces have been seen in cities like Bucharest, Sibiu, or Alba Iulia in Romania, in the French cities like Paris, Nice, Arles, Clamart, Obernai, Cambrai, Romans, La Grande Mottec o Aurillac to what it is necessary to add representations in Doetinchem in the Netherlands or in Pavia's city in Italy.

In January 2013, in Santiago de Chile he were conducted The Parade The Druid of Jagul placed in The International Festival Santiago of Chile to Mil. In September 2013 he were conducted the performance of Urban Theatre for the celebration of The XX Anniversary of the Spanish Cities Heritage of the Humanity, for the UNESCO.

For Katara Cultural Village Miguel Angel developed the master piece Fantasy in Katara that was represented in October 2013 in Doha-Qatar on the occasion of the Eid al-Adha Festival. Throughout the length and breadth of the whole Spanish geography and from the beginning of Miguel Angel artistic path it have been a numerous Spanish cities where they could have seen his spectacle, being the scenes the principal streets, avenues and squares of cities such as Madrid, Valencia, Alicante, Ibiza, Sabadell, Malaga, Salamanca, Vitoria, Segovia or Pontevedra, among others, where Miguel Angel has developed artistic projects for their festivities, events or The Three Kings Parade.

2014 was a very productive year for Miguel Angel Martin, thanks to the imagination and the effort in each show that he creates, Carros de Foc has been present all over the world realizing among others, a tour along the Arab Emirates and taken his shows to South Korea, China and Europe.

In addition Miguel Angel Urban Theatre Company has been present in many Spanish cities, representing his shows in festivals, events and other acts like The Medieval Fair of Melilla, the XX Anniversary of the Spanish Cities Heritage of Humanity in Segovia, The "Crida" of Valencia & The 9 of October in Alicante.

The year 2015 was full of opportunities, with very important performances that continued nourishing M.A.M experiences. The year started with the presentation of the new giant sculpture Euterpe on The Three Kings Parade in Madrid, followed by The Carnivals in Cadiz, Alicante & Saint Raphael (France).

The Urban Theatre released the new spectacle, " The Box of the Magic Letters" in the act of closing of the Gala Importantes of "The Information" newspaper.

== The carácter of his Works ==
The Giant Mobile Sculptures that appear in the street theatre works of Miguel Angel Martin Bordera, are original creations, of big dimensions. Due to their realism, they seem to be alive. They are articulated and mobility gifted reaching 12m of height. Their realistic character makes them surprising and they represent animals like a horse, an eagle or fantastic characters. The scenography where his creations are performed are own made and they are put to the service of the work so that the visual experience is complete. The characterization of the characters, the costumes, the body make-up, that includes latex worked, are combined for adding to the different artistic disciplines that integrates the performances a fantastic emotional and expressive strength.

== Latest creations ==
=== Natural Spirit ===
Natural Spirit in his great version, is one of the master pieces where the giant sculptures of Carros de Foc, Royal Horse, Eagle Sophia and the biggest puppet in the world named Salvador with 38 inches height. These three sculptures are the conductive trio that introduces us into the show to put in value the concept of Natural Spirit. The aim is to make us reflect on the aggression of mankind towards the nature, the need to reach a well-deserved respect towards the environment. The intention is to form a balance that bring sustainability between man and nature. Many ways are used to express and demonstrate this: music, lights, high flying acrobatics using fabrics, rhythmic dancers using fire, acrobats, interpretation and video. Different formats merge with different scenes each representing one of the earth's element; fire, air and water, interacting at the same time with the giant sculptures of " Salvador", " Águila Sophía" or "Caballo Real". This is undoubtedly a show of great visual impact, that it does not stop surprising where ever it goes in the world like in Spain, France, Portugal, Morocco, Romania, and Italy.

=== The Magic Box of Letters ===
The play is to reflect the basic values of the humanity. The protagonist is a young girl named Euterpe, created with the purpose of talking about the forgotten values, seeing beyond and touching upon the internal lethargic feelings of humanity.

The show is divided into three parts. The first part is the presentation of Euterpe, where she describes her human and industrial condition. At the same time of Euterpe presentation, a creation of a vertical choreography symbolizes the great risk that is to live in today's modern society.

The second part, Euterpe makes a tribute to the father figure as a creator and by extension to all the creators. The father figure is symbolize through the character that performs an acrobatic mid air spectacular. . Through this six meter high aerial acrobatic choreography, the staging is done. What it will mean for the creator to be side by side with his daughter to support her unconditionally through her life.

In the scene with which the stage play ends there is a reflection about the strength of the letters that creates words and how to use them properly, depending how they are being pronounced.

Euterpe invites us to continuously use kind words that open doors. This scene is performed with the elevation of the puppet levitating into the air above the square, creating a sublime visual scene.

During this scene four vertical dancers perched on the side stairs and stage space, to visually enhance this scene, symbolizing the industrial humanization.

== References in TV ==
- Miguel Ángel Martín en Canal 9
- Miguel Ángel Martín en TV1
- Miguel Ángel Martín en TVN Chile
- Miguel Ángel Martín en Antena 3
- Miguel Ángel Martín en Directo. Programa en Conexión
- Miguel Ángel Martín en el programa En Clau Económica Canal 9
- Miguel Ángel Martín en Reyes Magos TV1
- Miguel Ángel Martín en Carros de Foc TV1
