= Suspiro Square =

Suspiro Square is a public space in Nova Friburgo, Rio de Janeiro, Brazil. In January 2011, it was destroyed by the flood that struck Nova Friburgo and other municipalities in the Serrana Region. In 2014, the square was revitalized.

== See also ==
- Demerval Barbosa Moreira Square
- Getúlio Vargas Square
