= Demerval Barbosa Moreira Square =

Public space in Nova Friburgo

- Praça Demerval Barbosa Moreira
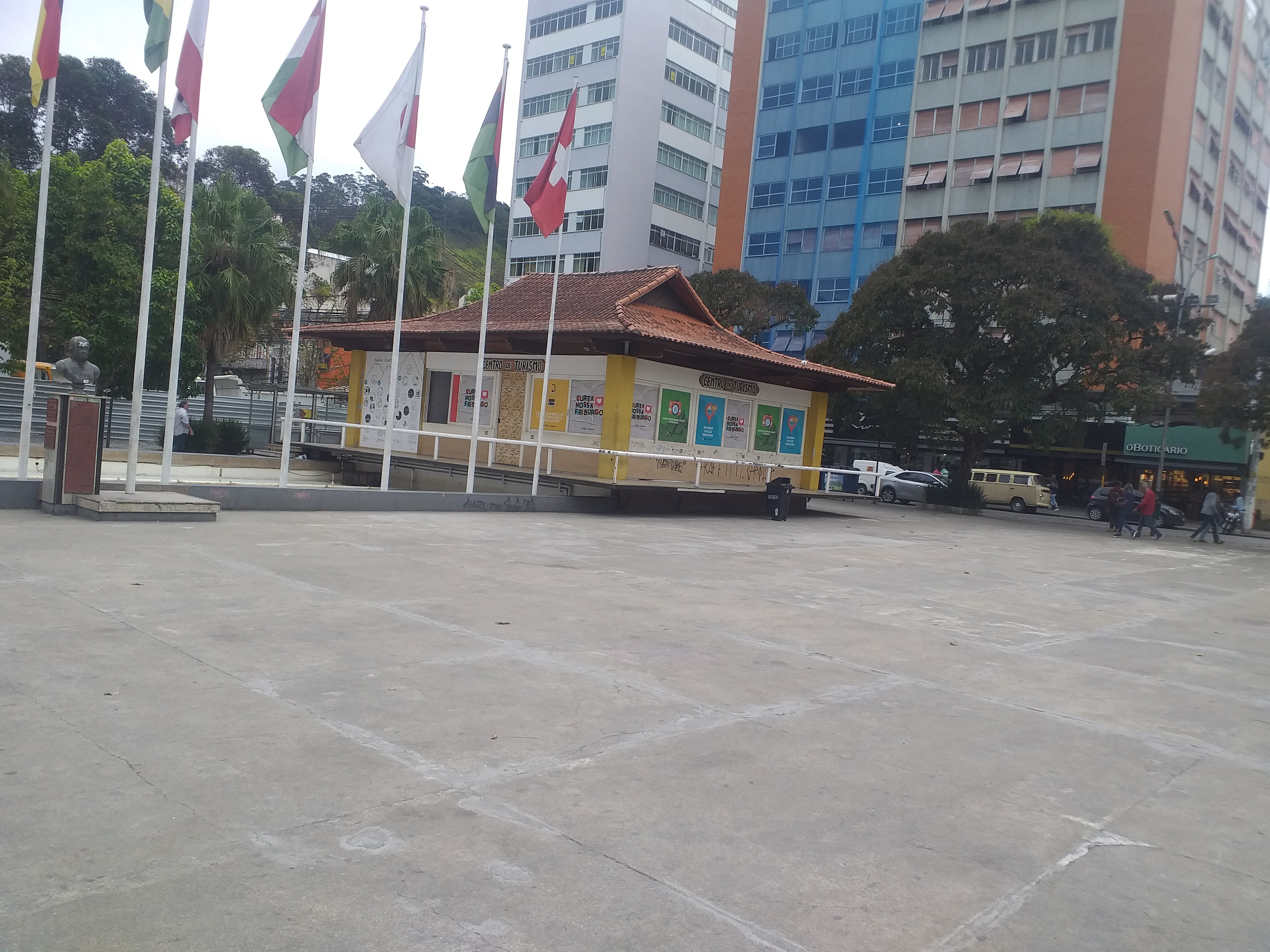
- Interactive map of Demerval Barbosa Moreira Square
- Type: Public Park
- Location: Nova Friburgo, Rio de Janeiro
- Coordinates: 22°16′55.86″S 42°31′52.85″W
- Operator: City of Nova Friburgo

Demerval Barbosa Moreira Square is a public space in Nova Friburgo, Rio de Janeiro, Brazil. It is named in honor of Dr. Dermeval Barbosa Moreira. It is located next to Getúlio Vargas Square and Alberto Braune Avenue.

The square is frequently used for cultural events, such as street theater, carnival, and others.

== Gallery ==
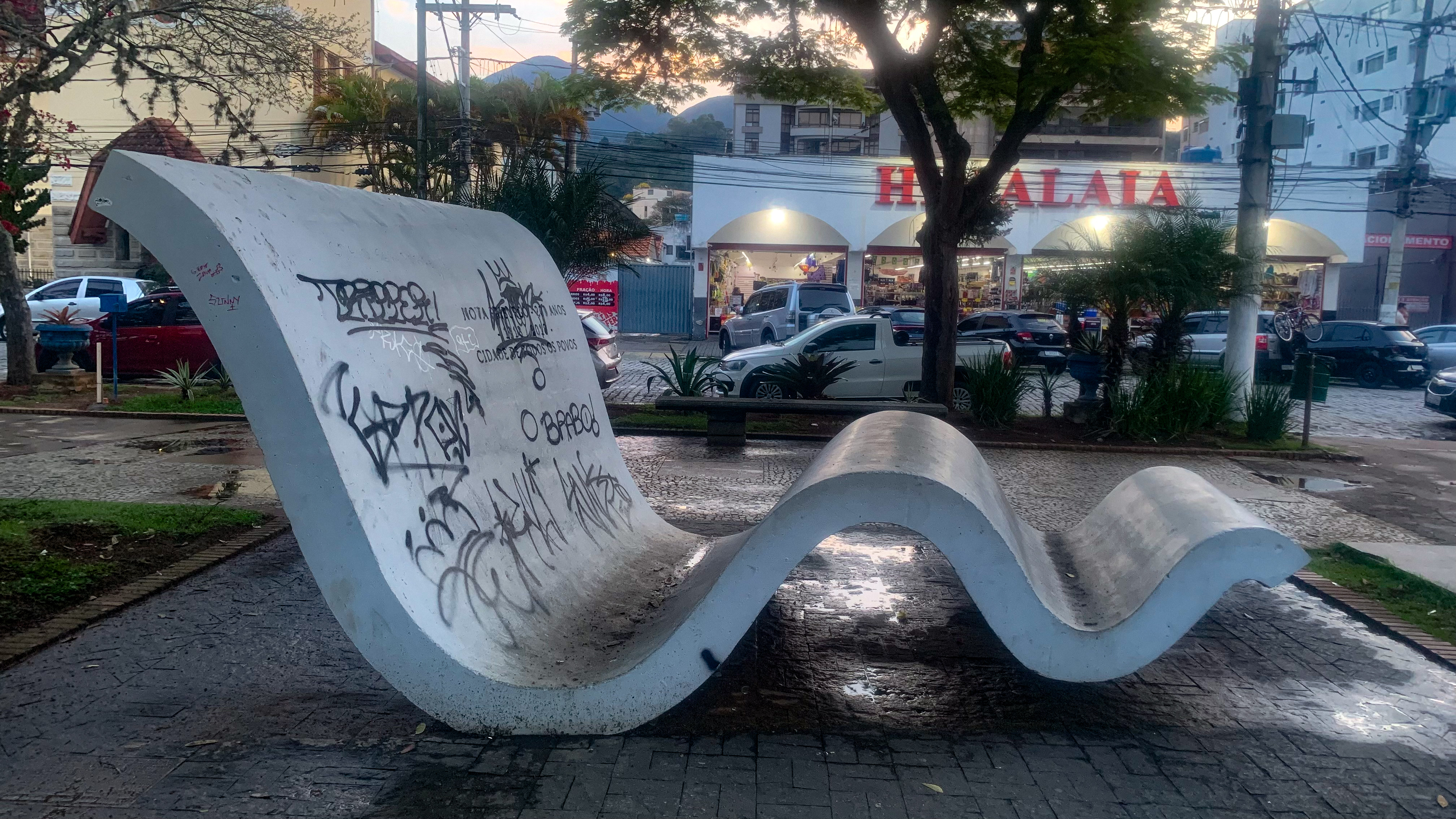
Vandalism

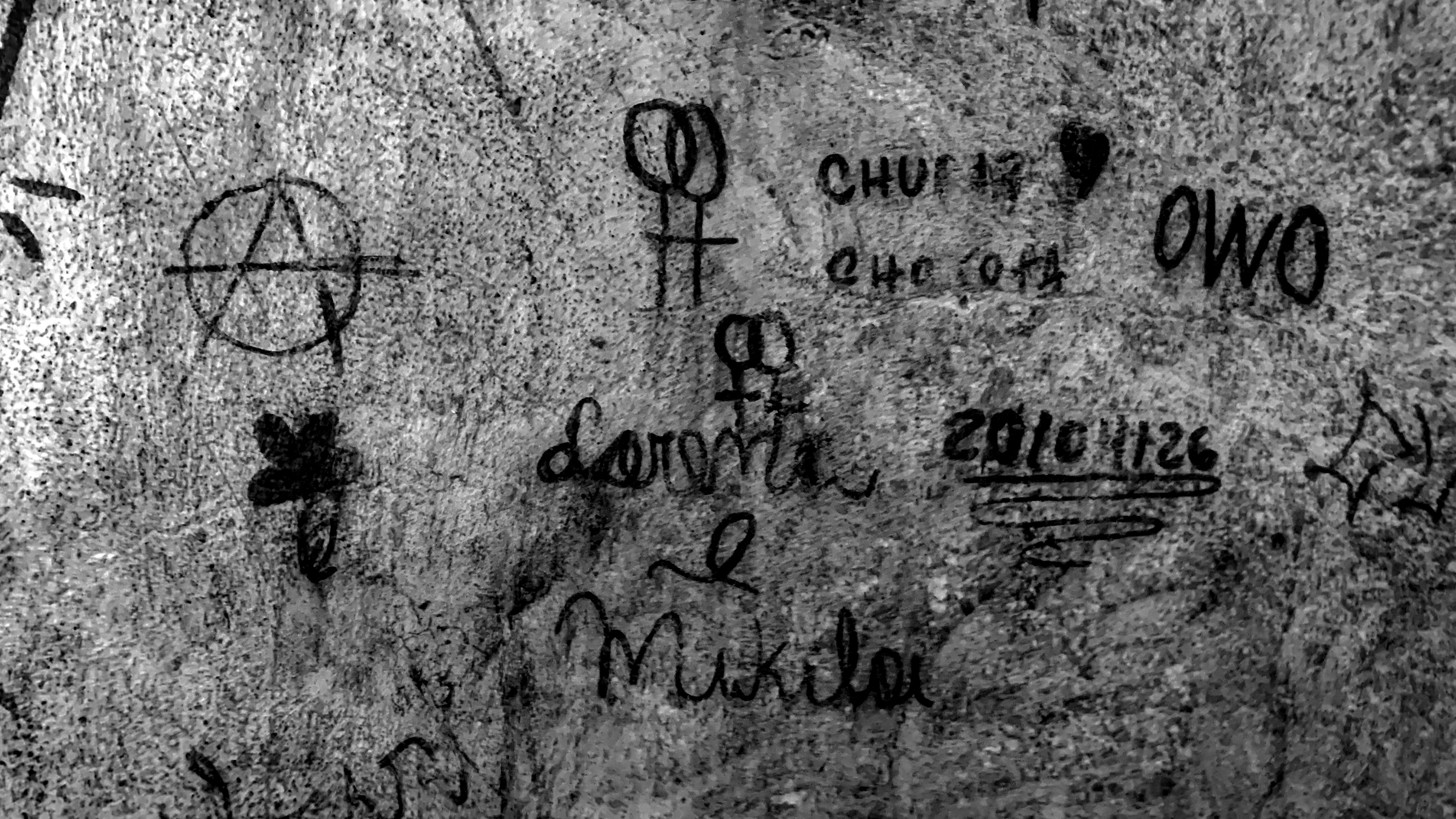
Another vandalism

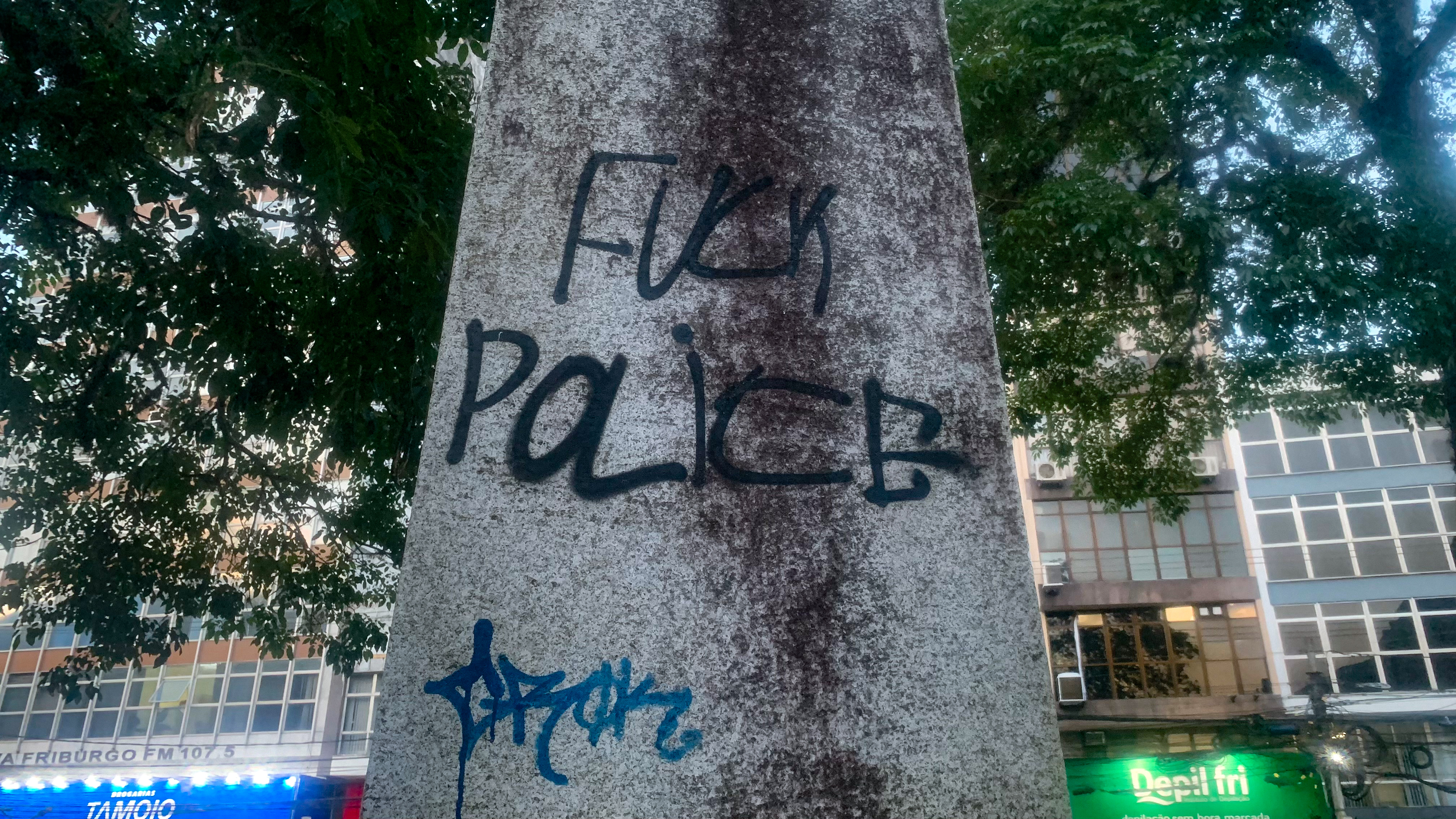
Graffiti reading "Fuck police"

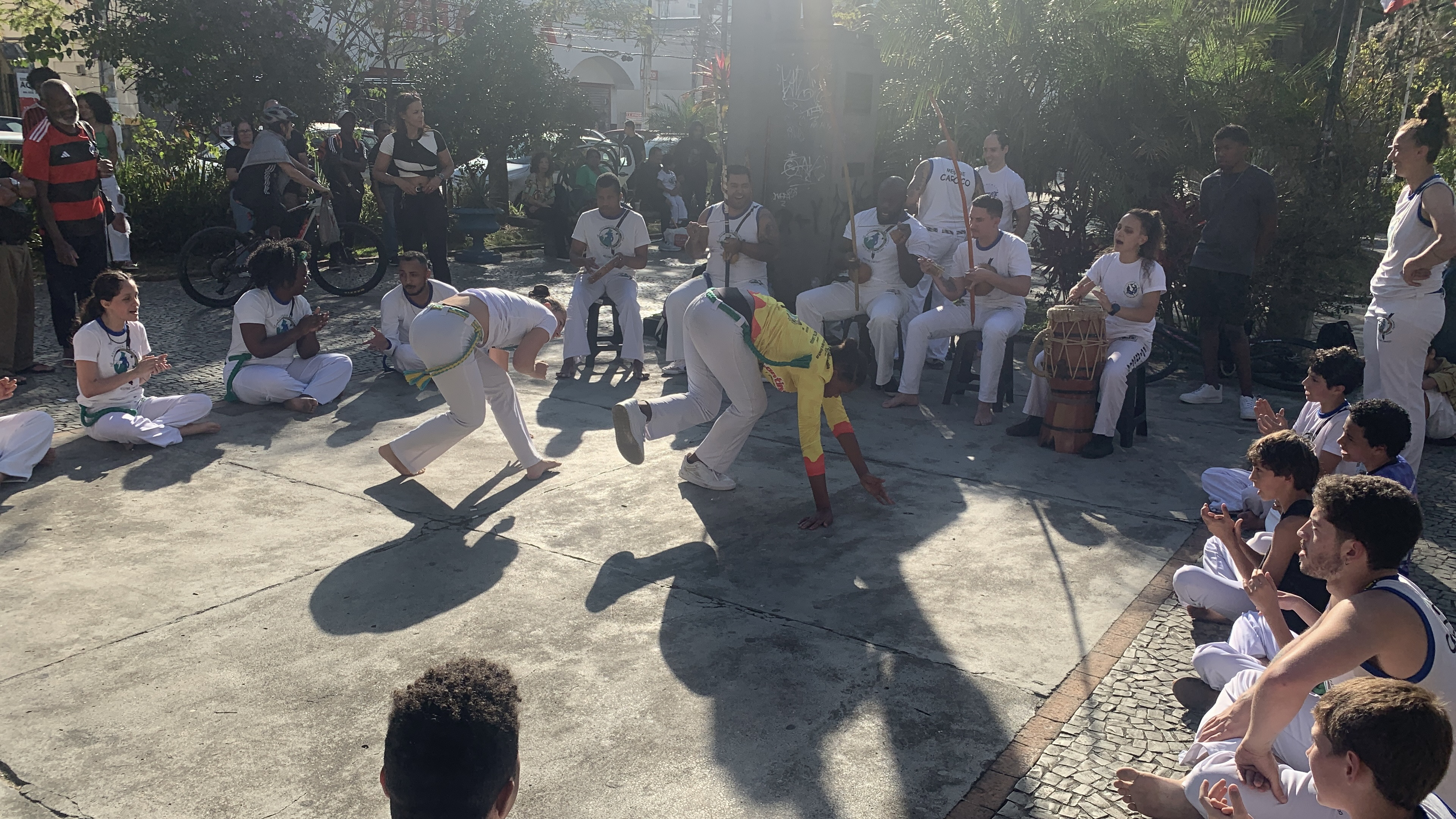
Capoeira

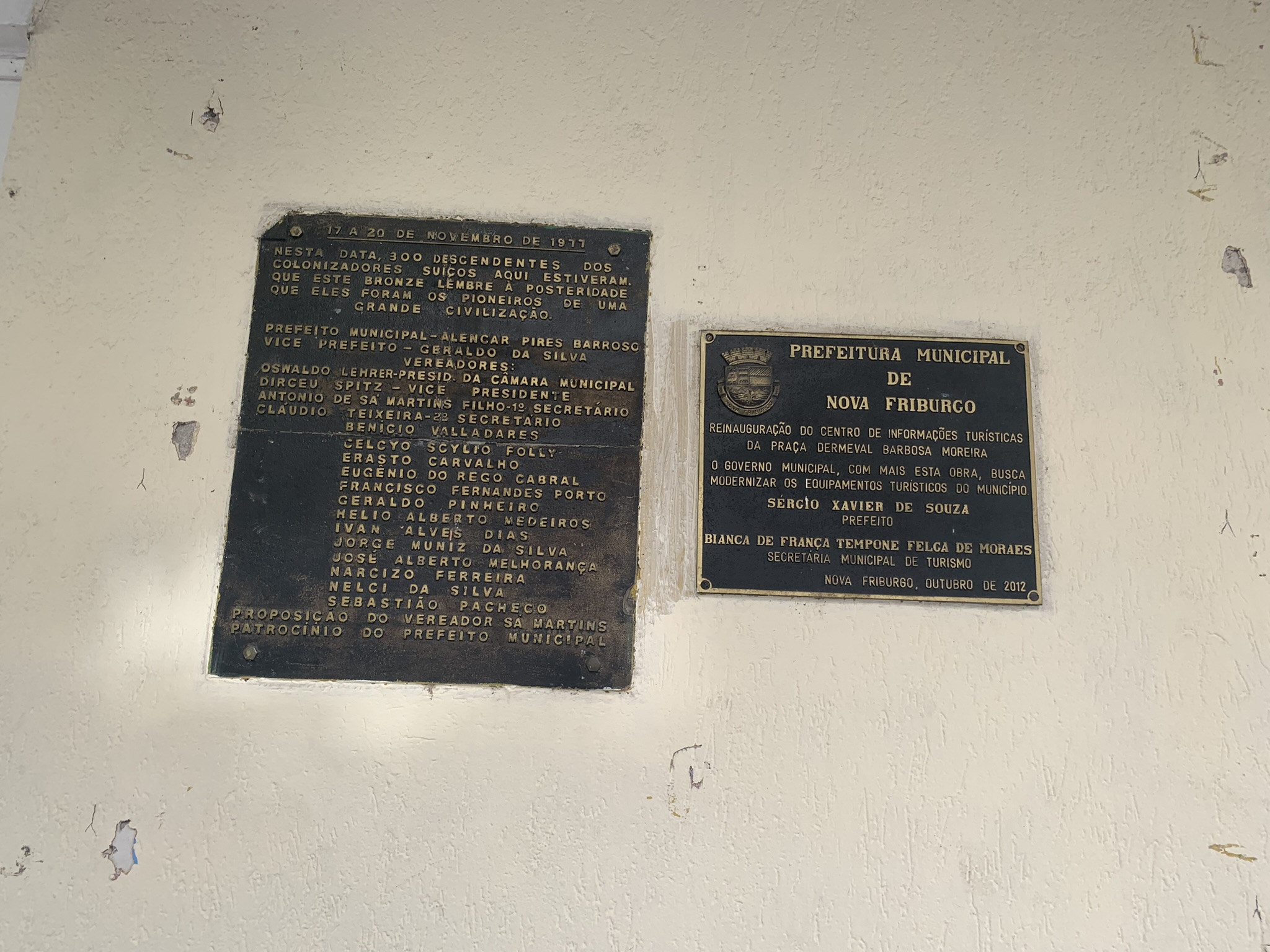
Commemorative plaque

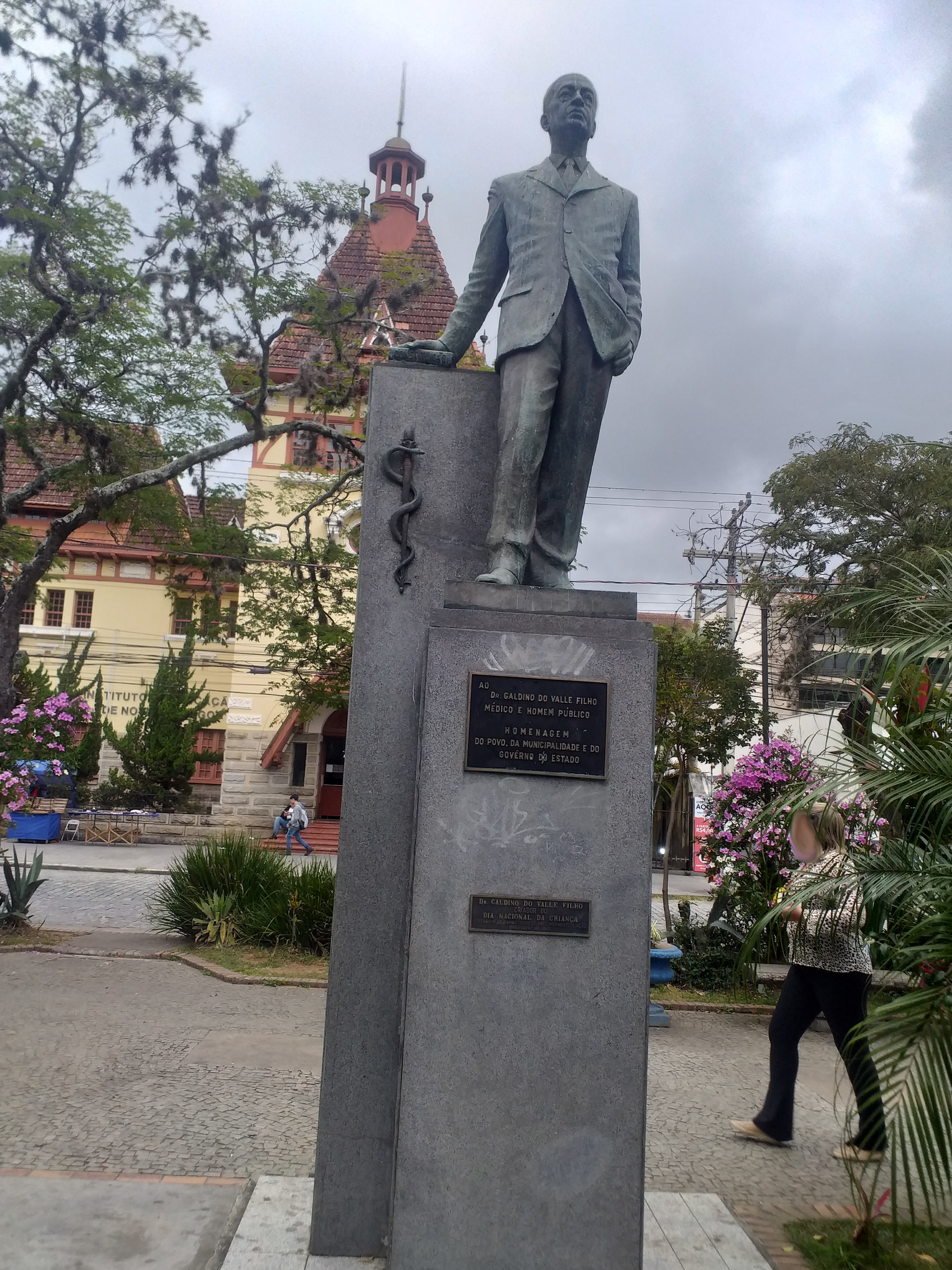
Statue of Dr. Galdino do Valle Filho

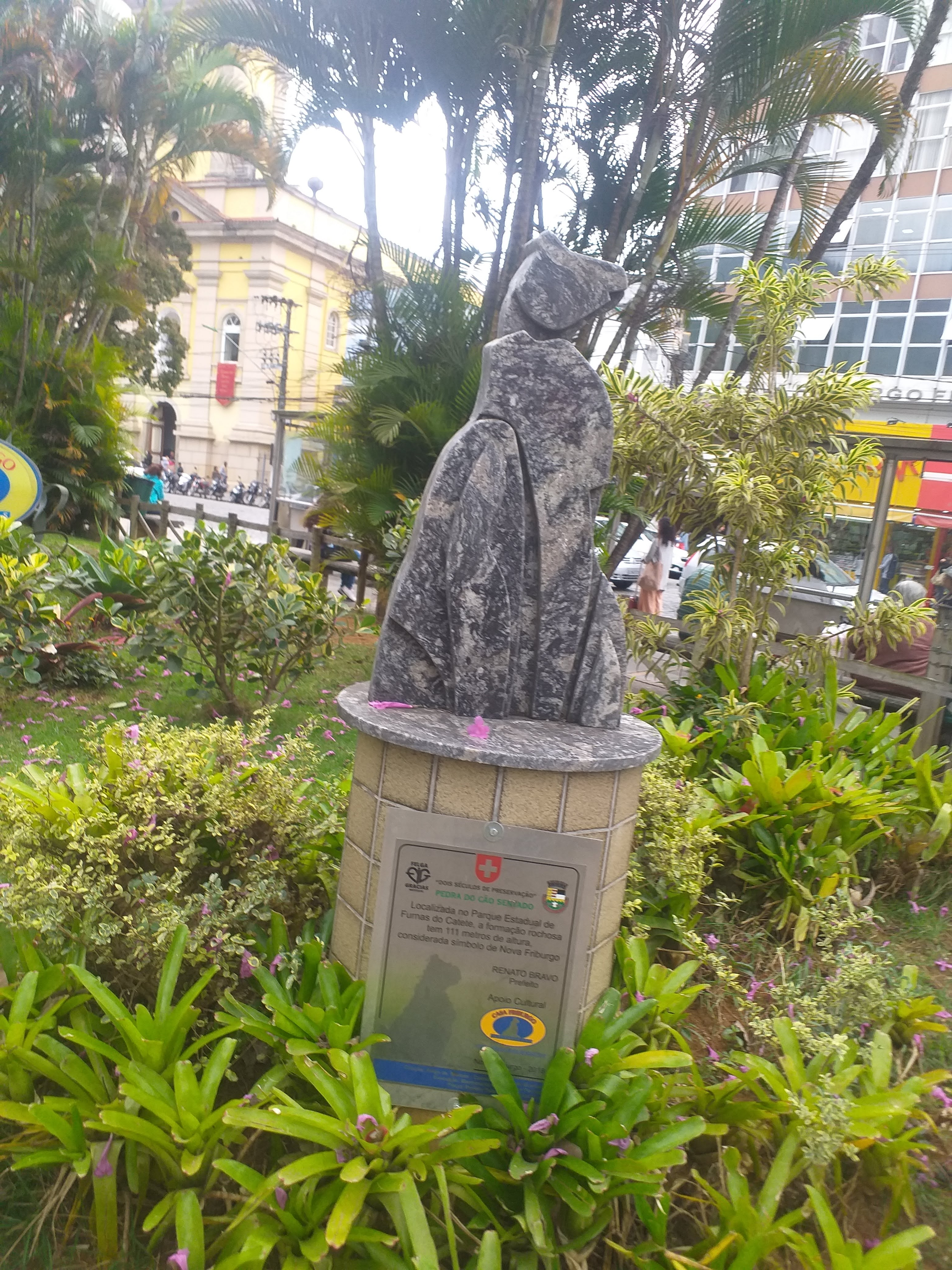
Cão sentado

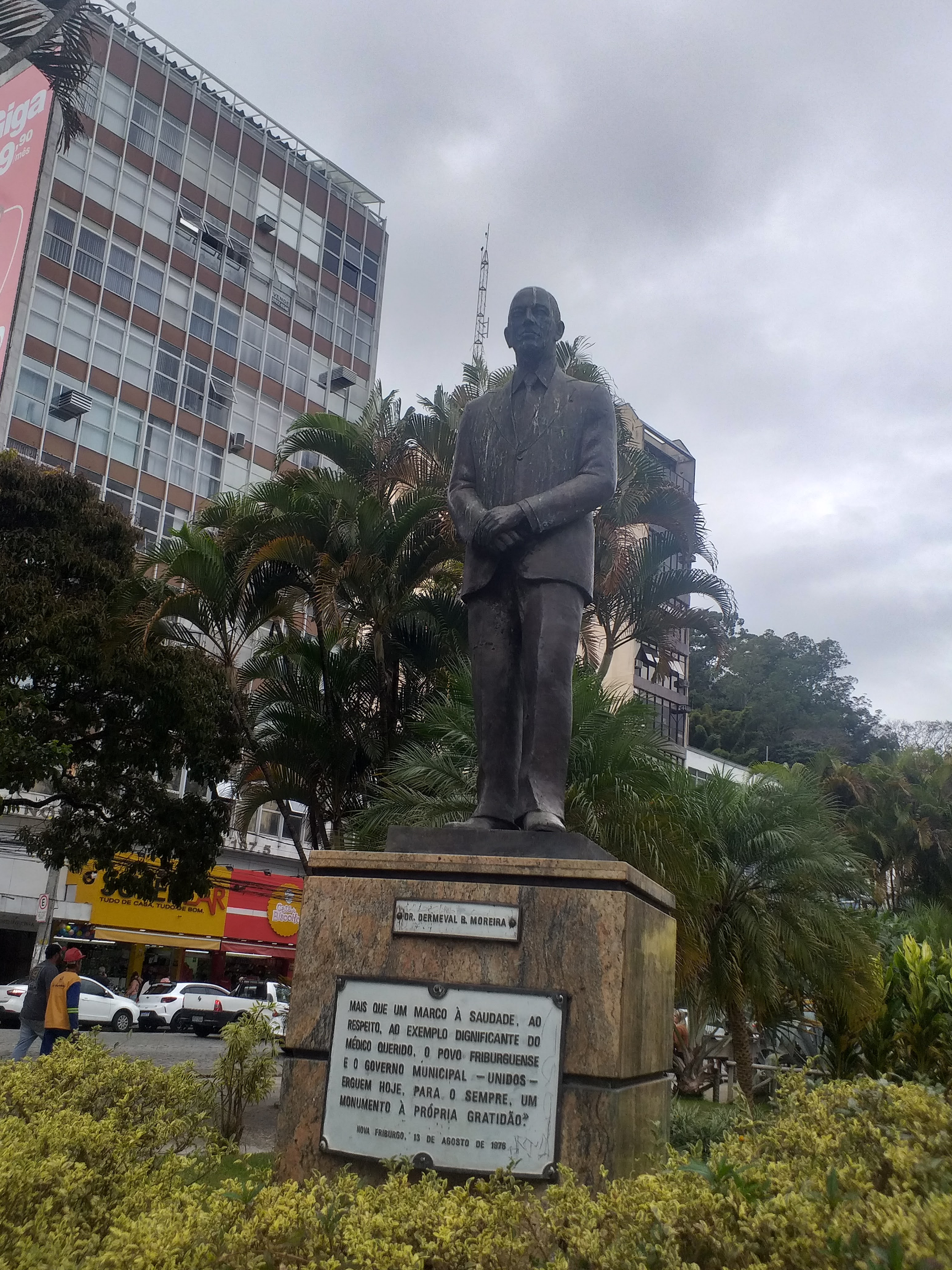
Tribute to Demerval Barbosa Moreira

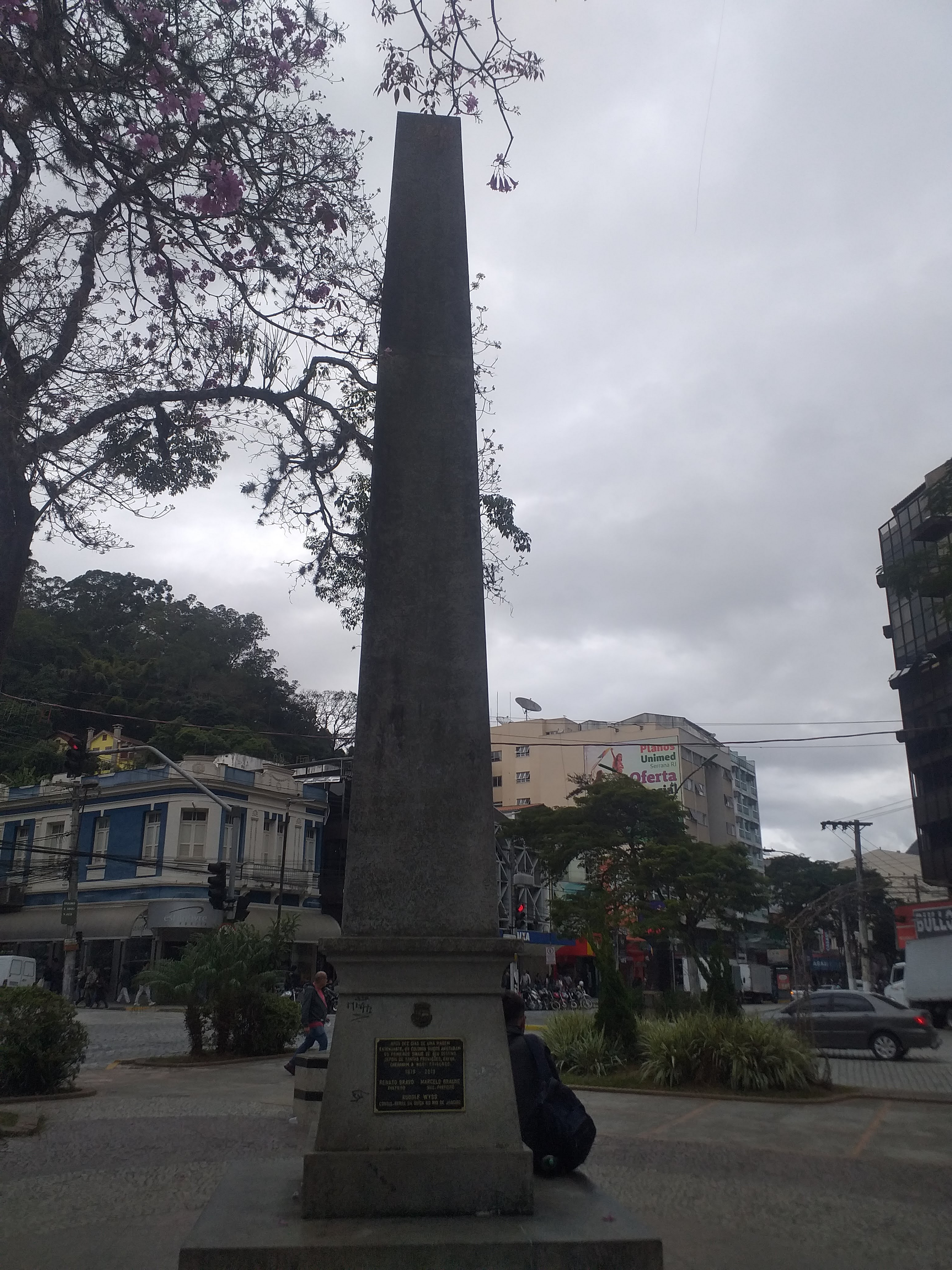
