= Laércio Ventura Municipal Theater =

- Teatro Municipal Laércio Ventura
- Laércio Ventura Municipal Theater at night in 29 July 2026
- Interactive map of the Laércio Ventura Municipal Theater area

General information
- Location: Rua Salusse 616, Nova Friburgo, Brazil
- Coordinates: 22.27967451943106°S 42.53631083679323°W
- Year built: 2008
- Owner: Nova Friburgo City Hall

The Laércio Rangel Ventura Municipal Theater (originally known as the Ariano Suassuna Municipal Theater), is a theater in the city of Nova Friburgo, in the state of Rio de Janeiro. The auditorium has a capacity of 564 spectators, with 482 on the ground floor and 82 in the balcony. In 2011, it was affected by the 2011 climate disaster. It was closed for a while but then reopened without any renovations. It is named in honor of Laercio Rangel Ventura.
