= The Imperial Orgy =

American artist collective

The Imperial Orgy is an artist collective founded in 1993 by artist Caeser Pink. Known primarily for their multimedia performances, music recordings, and film works, the group's creative work expresses an underlying philosophy of personal, spiritual, and political liberation based on independent thinking and enlightened individualism.

== Early years ==
The group formed in the film department of the Penn State University when Caeser Pink brought together a collection of film students to create a live multimedia presentation. The original collaborators were David Paterson, Michael Abrams, Louis Terrier, Samantha Delp, Lynn Anne Verbeck, and Ron Aurand. The performance was a free form mix of music, dance, video art projections, theatre, performance art, humor, and costuming. Once the project was ready for presentation the group could not find a theatre willing to allow them to present the performance. Instead The Imperial Orgy was presented in a night club that normally featured local cover bands.

Imperial Orgy circa 1994

The themes explored in the performance included anti-establishment politics, alternative spiritual concepts, and personal and sexual liberation. The reaction to the performance was extreme, split between those who loved and those who hated the message presented. Quickly the group became the center of controversy as they repeated the performance at various venues in the area of the Penn State University. Performances were cancelled due to protests and threats of violence from religious organizations, their event posters were banned from the university causing a freedom of speech fight championed by the student newspaper, and women's studies classes debated the group's presentations of sexuality.

== New York years ==
Imperial Orgy circa 1998

In 1995 the core group, minus Ron Aurand moved to New York City. During the move creative differences led to a succession of personnel changes and a period of relative inactivity. By 1997 The Imperial Orgy had regrouped with a larger community that included costume designers, choreographers, filmmakers, and a core line-up of Caeser Pink, Eric Mauriello, Tony Dilullo, Joyce Isabelle, Louis Terrier, Samantha Delp, and Lynn Anne Verbeck.

This began a flurry of activity that included performances at some of New York City's best venues, the production of a cable TV series, the creation of innovative websites, art exhibitions, fashion shows, poetry readings, multi-artist music concerts, political salon debates, and music recordings. Reaction to The Imperial Orgy was mixed and seemingly confused. Major record labels courted the group but were rejected because they wished to turn the group into a traditional rock band for marketing purposes. The group landed on the cover of international publications such as .Net Magazine, Gig Magazine, and Mac Today Magazine. Their television series was syndicated in many cities across the U.S. and in France, Netherlands, and Australia. This period of activity climaxed with the production of a giant counter-culture masquerade ball at Webster Hall, a four-story theatre/night club in New York's East Village.

== New millennium ==
Performance piece titled Frozen

Performance piece titled I Am A Murderer

By the beginning of the millennium, The Imperial Orgy had expanded to become a large collective with hundreds of collaborators. Their multimedia performances featured a rotating cast of dozens of musicians, actors, dancers, performance artists, filmmakers, costume designers, choreographers, and tech designers. Among the notable collaborators are:

- Drummer, vibraphonist, and classical composer Frank Picarazzi
- Drummer Ron Wilson (Lou Christie)
- Actress and singer Erica Mansfield (A Chorus Line, Mamma Mia!)
- Actress and singer Jen Oda (The Hirosaki Players, Royal Pains, Spider-Man 3, Back Stab)
- Singer, songwriter, and bassist Bonnie Bowers
- Dancer, actress and singer Ivette Oliveras
- Actress and singer Agelica Lee Aspiras (Spelling Bee)
- Singer and dancer Talia Wright
- Saxophonist Kim Bock (Kim Bock Quartet)
- Fashion designer Vilma Mare
- Fashion designers Gaelyn & Cianfarani
- Fashion designer Garo Sparo
- Photographer Anthony Lepore
- Photographer John Kolesa
- Guitarist Reeves Gabrels
- Photographer Matthew Seigelbaum
- Performance artist Amber Ray
- Actress Vanessa Del Rio
- Artist Ademola Olugebefola

Performance piece titled Struggle The Void

Shortly after 9/11 The Imperial Orgy began two years of inactivity. Caeser Pink worked at Ground Zero in the months after 9/11 and traveled across the United States by car while writing the book "Murder Of The Holly King" which chronicled the experience of exploring America in the aftermath of the terrorist attacks. In 2003 the group founded a non-profit organization the Arete Living Arts Foundation to fund artist projects and develop innovative artists. In 2004 Caeser Pink returned to his economically and socially troubled hometown, Lewistown, Pennsylvania for a year where he utilized the non-profit organization to offer free computer classes in video editing, web design, and graphic design.

In 2006 The Imperial Orgy released a music CD titled Gospel Hymns For Agnostics And Atheists, and in 2007 a second CD titled All God's Children. Both CDs caused controversy due to their lyrical content. The recordings were banned from many college radio stations, and the unusual nature of the music and themes brought a wave of press coverage from college newspapers and regional press outlets. Among the issues that caused controversy was Pink's message against religious intolerance and his promotion of spirituality that transcends denominations.

On April 5, 2010 The Imperial Orgy blasted into outer space when Stephanie Wilson, an astronaut aboard the Discovery space shuttle took the group's All God's Children CD into orbit for the listening pleasures of the international space station. The seven-member crew aboard Discovery were on a 13-day mission carrying supplies and science equipment for the space station.

== Recent works ==
- In 2008 The Imperial Orgy teamed up with the legendary The Living Theatre troupe for a performance in their Soho theatre.
- In 2009 The Imperial Orgy partnered with the Chashama Gallery for a multimedia performance and an exhibition of Imperial Orgy artists at their Manhattan Gallery that included artists Stephen Woods, Jorge Namerow, Jody Fallon, Jennie Booth, Liya Sheer, Keith Duncan, Helene Ruiz, and Danylo Pelonis, photographers Cheryl Fallon, Steve Geyer, and Joyce Isabelle, and the premier of the Caeser Pink film Temple Paintings #2 .
- In 2009 The Imperial Orgy also began production of a series of black and white art films titled Meditations.
- In 2010 they group released a recording on CD and LP titled Four Legs Good, Two Legs Baaad!.
- In 2010 Caeser Pink published his novel The Murder Of The Holly King. Although published as fiction, the book is actually a memoir written in a free-form style similar to Henry Miller's Tropic series. Pink supported the publication with promotional tours where he combined book readings with acoustic music performances. Often accompanied by Heather Milburn on violin and accordion.
- In 2011 The Imperial Orgy began recording a new album tentatively titled "A Whole New Way Of Makin' It Happen," with recording engineer Robert Hornablue.
- In 2020 The Imperial Orgy released a music video titled Yeah! Yeah! Yeah! The video won 20 awards from film festivals around the world. It was filmed at the Greenpoint Gallery in Brooklyn, New York. Although the video is controversial, it was used in a civil rights campaign to promote unity and acceptance. The video is a hard-hitting satire of prejudice and bigotry.
- In 2023 The Imperial Orgy released a music video titled The Prescription. The song is about the corporate role in prescription drug addiction and questions the reason for the widespread use of psychotropic drugs. Most of the video was shot in Caeser Pink's hometown in Lewistown, Pennsylvania.
- In 2024 The Imperial Orgy released the album "A whole New Way Of Makin' It Happen!" on CD and as a two-disc vinyl LP. The album is an epic concept album that includes guest stars Reeves Gabrels (The Cure, Tin Machine, David Bowie), and Mike Garson (David Bowie, NIN, Smashing Pumpkins). The styles range from Punk, Trip-hop, classic rock, spoken word, funk, jazz, ambient, to Neo-classical.

== Discography ==
- A Whole New Way Of Makin' It Happen! - Double LP, CD
- Four Legs Good, Two Legs Baaad! - LP CD 2010
- A Happy Thought (Bootleg Series II) - Digital release - 2009
- Sexual Revolution (Bootleg Series I) - Digital release - 2008
- All God's Children - CD 2007
- Gospel Hymns For Agnostics & Atheists - CD 2006
- The Imperial Orgy Community Sampler - CD 2002
- The NY Demo Tapes - CD 1997

== Films ==
- The Prescription (Music Video) - 2023
- Yeah! Yeah! Yeah! (Music Video) - 2020
- Meditations - 2009
- Temple Paintings - 2008
- Ecumenicals Series - 2007
- The Bottom Rung - Hi8 Video - 1995
- Heart Beats Fire - VHS -1994
- Politic America - 16mm - 1994

== DVDs ==
- The Imperial Orgy TV Show Season #1 - VHS DVD 2001
- Early Documentaries - DVD 2004
- Eye 17 Experimental Films - DVD 2005

== Television ==
- The Imperial Orgy TV Show 2002
- Live from Webster Hall 2010
- Live at Chashama Gallery

== Books ==
- The Orgy Hymnal (A collection of lyrics, poetry, and photography)
- The Murder Of The Holly King (Novel)
