= Rogério Cabral =

Brazilian politician (born 1962)

Pedro Rogério Vieira Cabral (Nova Friburgo, June 29 1962) is a Brazilian farmer and politician who served as a city council member in Nova Friburgo, municipal secretary of agriculture, and a representative in the Rio de Janeiro State Legislative Assembly for the PSB. In January 2013, he took office as mayor of Nova Friburgo.
