= Dante Laginestra =

Brazilian politician

Dante Laginestra (1902–1964) was a Brazilian politician. He was mayor of Nova Friburgo. On April 7, 1945, he founded the newspaper A Voz da Serra.

He was of Italian descent.
