= Alberto Braune Avenue =

Coordinates: 22°17′09″S 42°31′53″W

- Avenida Alberto Braune
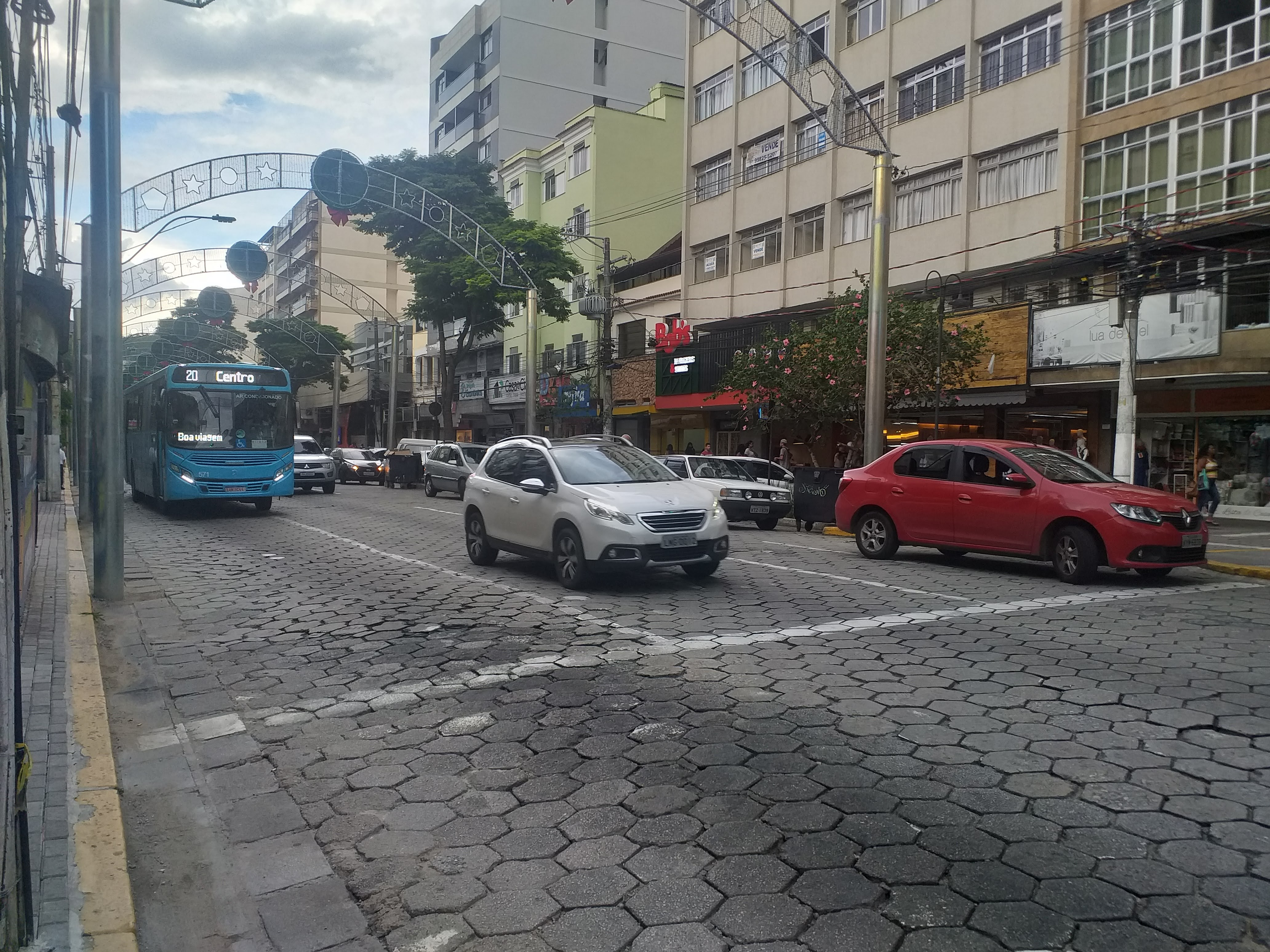
- Interactive map of Alberto Braune Avenue
- Type: Avenue
- Location: Nova Friburgo, Rio de Janeiro
- Postal code: 28613-000 and 28613-001
- North: Praça Demerval Barbosa Moreira
- South: Rua Moisés Amélio

The Alberto Braune Avenue is the main and most important avenue in Nova Friburgo, a Brazilian municipality in the mountainous region of Rio de Janeiro. It is located in the city center, where the City Hall, Cadima Shopping, and numerous stores and bank branches are situated.
