= Nova Friburgo City Hall =

Coordinates: 22.2880°S 42.5317°W

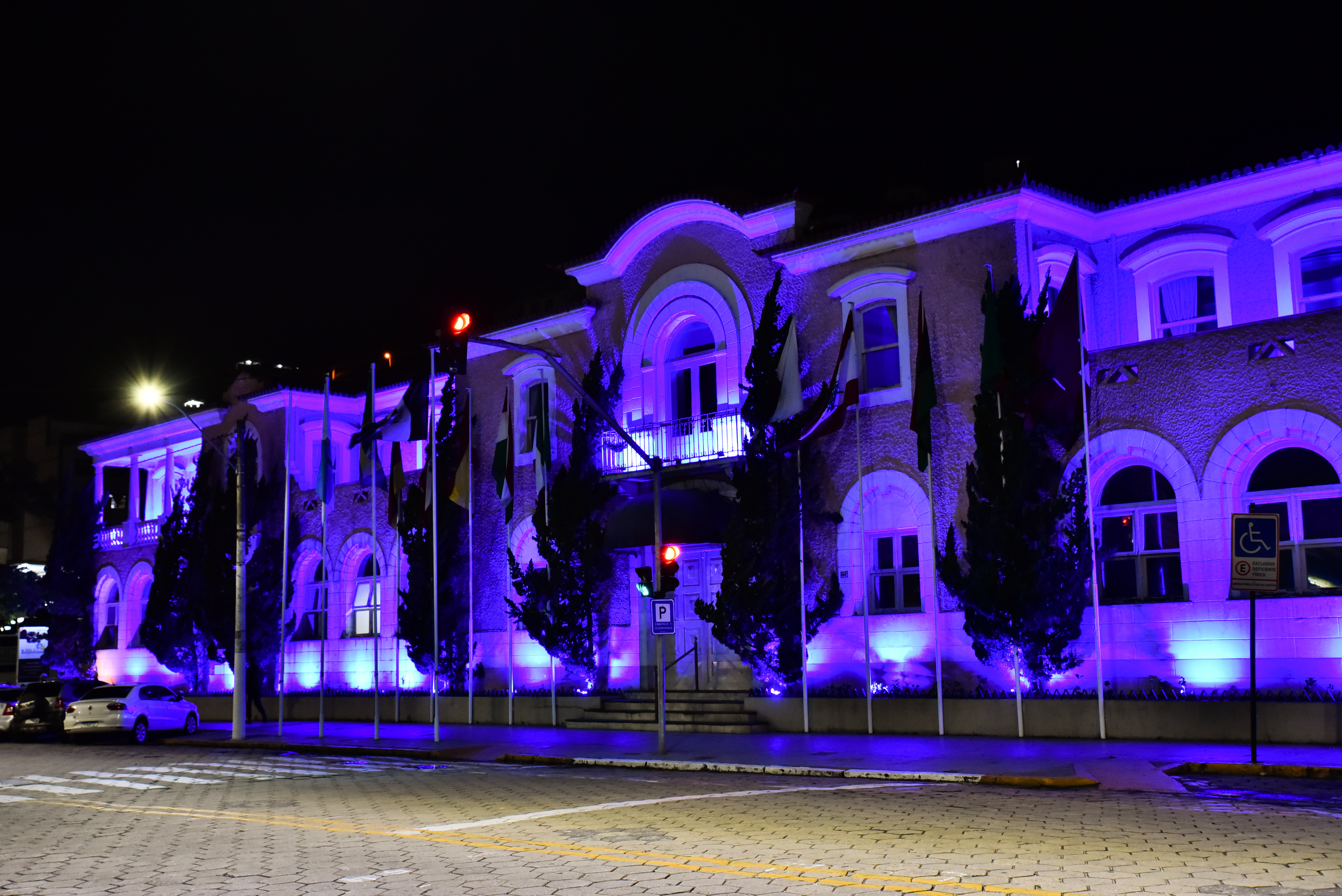
- Nova Friburgo City Hall in 2022

General information
- Location: Alberto Braune Avenue, Nova Friburgo, Rio de Janeiro
- Years built: 1988 (The current); 1935 (The old)

Nova Friburgo City Hall is located at Alberto Braune Avenue in Nova Friburgo, Rio de Janeiro, Brazil. The contemporary building was listed by Inepac in 1988, and replaced the Old Nova Friburgo City Hall, a historic building constructed in 1935.

== History ==
=== Old city hall ===
The old city hall was inaugurated in June 1935, replacing the building of 1873.

=== Current city hall ===
The current Nova Friburgo City Hall, located on Alberto Braune Avenue, is a Neocolonial-style building originally constructed to serve as the Leopoldina Railway station. After decommissioning, the building was restored and adapted toserve as the municipal administrative center.
