= Getúlio Vargas Square =

Public space in Nova Friburgo

- Praça Getúlio Vargas
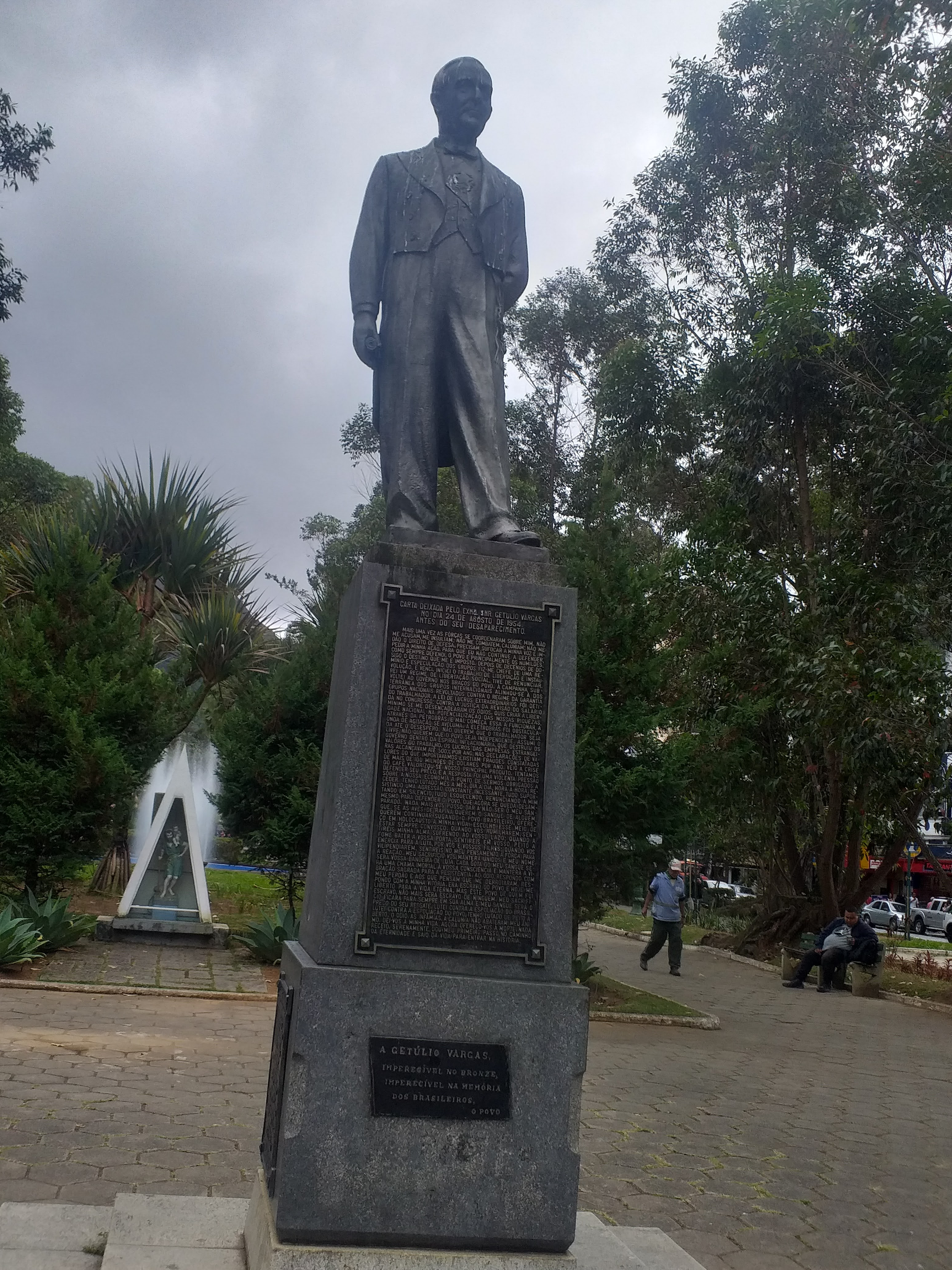
- Interactive map of Getúlio Vargas Square
- Type: Public Park
- Location: Nova Friburgo, Rio de Janeiro
- Coordinates: 22°16′49.728″S 42°31′56.834″W
- Operator: City of Nova Friburgo

Getúlio Vargas Square is a public space in Nova Friburgo, Rio de Janeiro, Brazil. It is located next to Demerval Barbosa Moreira Square.

It is designated as a national heritage site by IPHAN since 1972.

As in many Brazilian cities, its name honors President Getúlio Vargas.

== Gallery ==
Commemorative plaque

Vergilivs

Getúlio Vargas Square in 2026

Suicide note left by Getúlio Vargas

== See also ==
- Demerval Barbosa Moreira Square
