= Nêgo's Garden =

- Jardim do Nêgo
- Established: 1981
- Location: Nova Friburgo, Rio de Janeiro, Brazil
- Coordinates: 22°15′33″S 42°37′08″W
- Type: open-air museum
- Owner: Geraldo Simplício

The Nêgo's Garden (Jardim do Nêgo) is an open-air sculpture museum located in the Campo do Coelho district on the RJ-130 highway in the Brazilian municipality of Nova Friburgo. It was damaged in the January 2011 Rio de Janeiro floods and mudslides and closed for several months; the disaster resulted in the destruction of the head of the "Bebezão" sculpture. It was created by Geraldo Simplício, better known as Nêgo.

In 2014, the British newspaper The Guardian included the garden on a list of “Brazil's hidden treasures”.

== Background ==
The Nêgo's Garden was created in 1981 when the visual artist Geraldo Simplício, known as Nêgo, was inspired to transform the earthen ravines on his property into monumental sculptures.

From that point, Nêgo began sculpting large-scale human and animal figures, some of which reached 10 meters in height. The garden covers an area of nearly 30,000 square meters.

== Sculptures ==
There are 17 sculptures made of clay.
