= Transport in Nova Friburgo =

Nova Friburgo is a Brazilian municipality in the state of Rio de Janeiro. There are two coach stations.

== Air transport ==
There's no airport in Nova Friburgo.

== Hightways ==
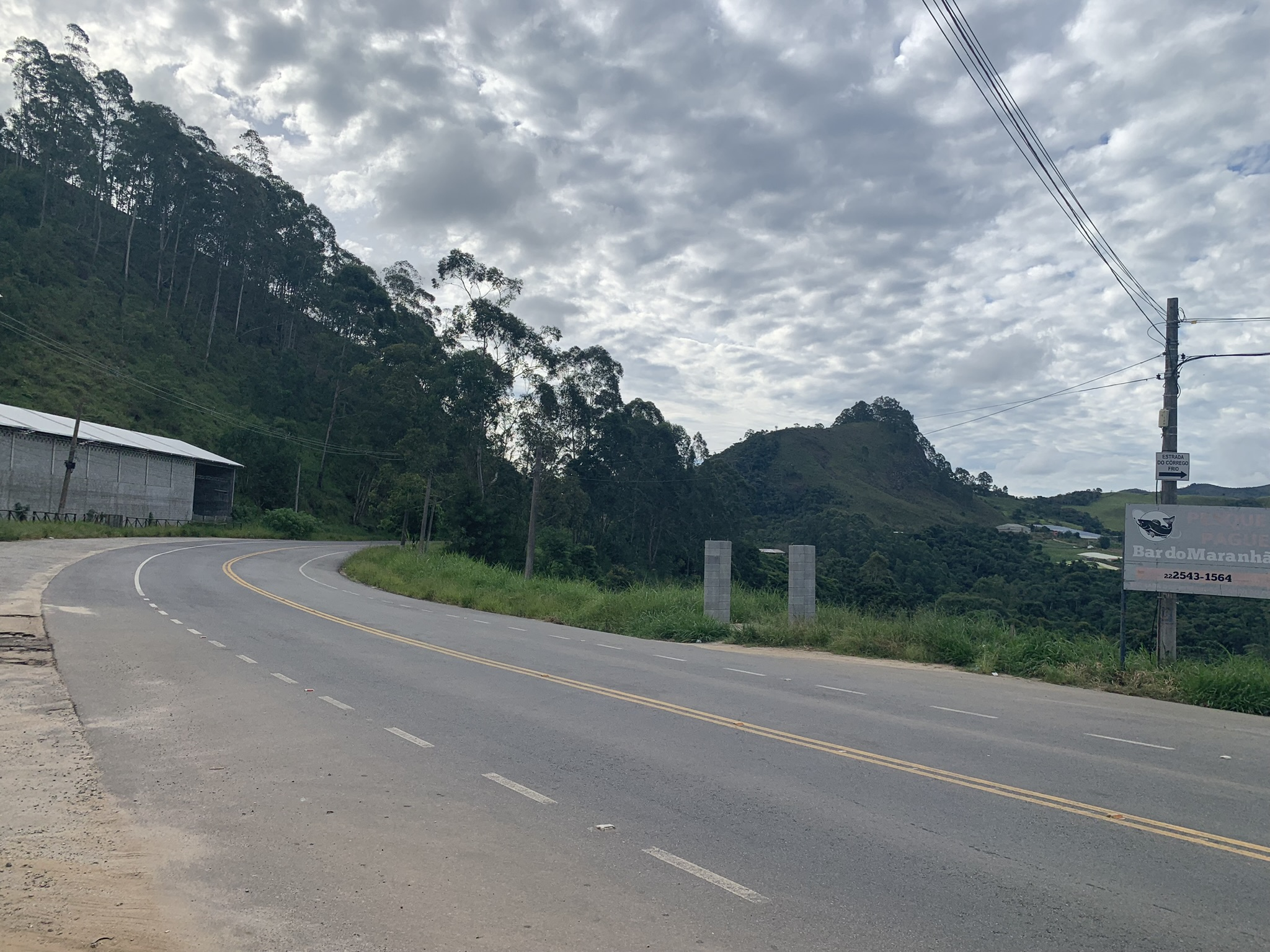
RJ-130 in Campo do Coelho

Nova Friburgo is connected to four state highways: RJ-116, which begins in Itaboraí and ends in the district of Comendador Venâncio, RJ-142, which ends in Casimiro de Abreu, RJ-150, which connects to São José do Ribeirão, a district of Bom Jardim and RJ-148, which ends Córrego da Prata, in municipality of Carmo.

== Rail transport ==
The railway arrived in Nova Friburgo on 18 December 1873 and remained in service until it was closed down in July 1964.

== Bus ==
There is only one bus company: FAOL (Friburgo Auto Ônibus Ltda.).

Nova Friburgo has two bus terminals: the Rodoviário Sul, which opened in 1995 and is located in Ponte da Saudade, and the Terminal Norte, located in Duas Pedras. In the city center stands the old city bus station, now called Estação Livre, which serves the city with both urban and rural routes.
