= Academia Friburguense de Letras =

The Academia Friburguense de Letras (Portuguese: Friburguense Academy of Letters) is a Brazilian literary organization located in Nova Friburgo. The Academia Friburguense de Letras was founded on June 22, 1947.
