= Climate of Nova Friburgo =

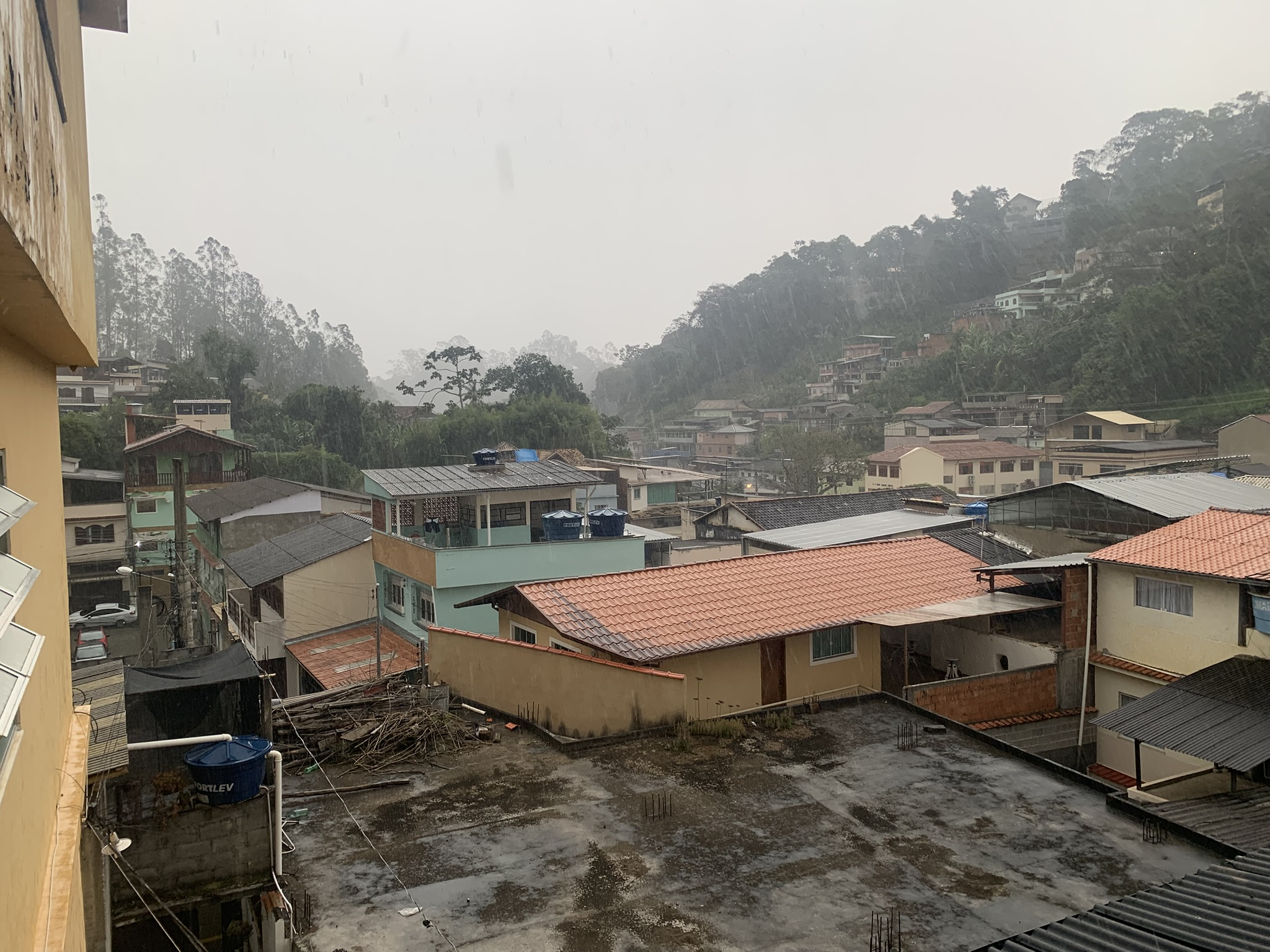
Rain in the Catarcione neighborhood on November 29, 2024

Nova Friburgo is the coldest city in the state of Rio de Janeiro, with the mild mesothermal climate according to Köppen-Geiger climate classification (Cfb), with four relatively distinct seasons.

== Temperature ==
Nova Friburgo's average annual temperature is 36 °C (97 °F) during the day and 14.5 °C (58.1 °F) at night. In the coldest month, July, has a temperature of 9.9 °C (49.8 °F). In the hottest month, March, has a temperature of 35 °C (95 °F). The highest absolute temperature officially recorded in the history of Nova Friburgo was 37.3°C on October 30, 1948. The lowest temperature, meanwhile, was recorded at 05 °C (41 °F) in 2025.

=== Averages ===
Climate data for Nova Friburgo
Month	Jan	Feb	Mar	Apr	May	Jun	Jul	Aug	Sep	Oct	Nov	Dec	Year
Mean daily maximum °C (°F)	35.2 (95.4)	33.3 (91.9)	35.8 (96.4)	33.6 (92.5)	32.2 (90.0)	29.4 (84.9)	30.2 (86.4)	33 (91)	33.6 (92.5)	35 (95)	36 (97)	34 (93)	36 (97)
Mean daily minimum °C (°F)	17.8 (64.0)	17.7 (63.9)	17.5 (63.5)	16.1 (61.0)	13.0 (55.4)	10.6 (51.1)	9.9 (49.8)	10.8 (51.4)	12.9 (55.2)	14.9 (58.8)	16.2 (61.2)	17.0 (62.6)	14.5 (58.1)
Source: Source: National Institute of Meteorology (climatological norm for 1981–2010); Precipitation, relative humidity, and hours of sunshine: 1961–1990 climatological norm;, temperature records: February 1, 1961, to February 28, 2003).

== Precipitation ==
The wettest month is January with 232.1 mm. While the driest is August of only 23.7. 1,279.8 mm of total precipitation fall a year.

Climate data for Nova Friburgo
Month	Jan	Feb	Mar	Apr	May	Jun	Jul	Aug	Sep	Oct	Nov	Dec	Year
Average precipitation mm (inches)	232.1 (9.14)	165.2 (6.50)	154.6 (6.09)	61.4 (2.42)	39.8 (1.57)	32.3 (1.27)	24.7 (0.97)	23.7 (0.93)	52.4 (2.06)	86.3 (3.40)	186.1 (7.33)	221.2 (8.71)	1,279.8 (50.39)
Average precipitation days (≥ 1.0 mm)	14	11	11	7	5	5	4	3	5	9	12	14	100
Source: Source: National Institute of Meteorology
