= Pedra do Cão Sentado =

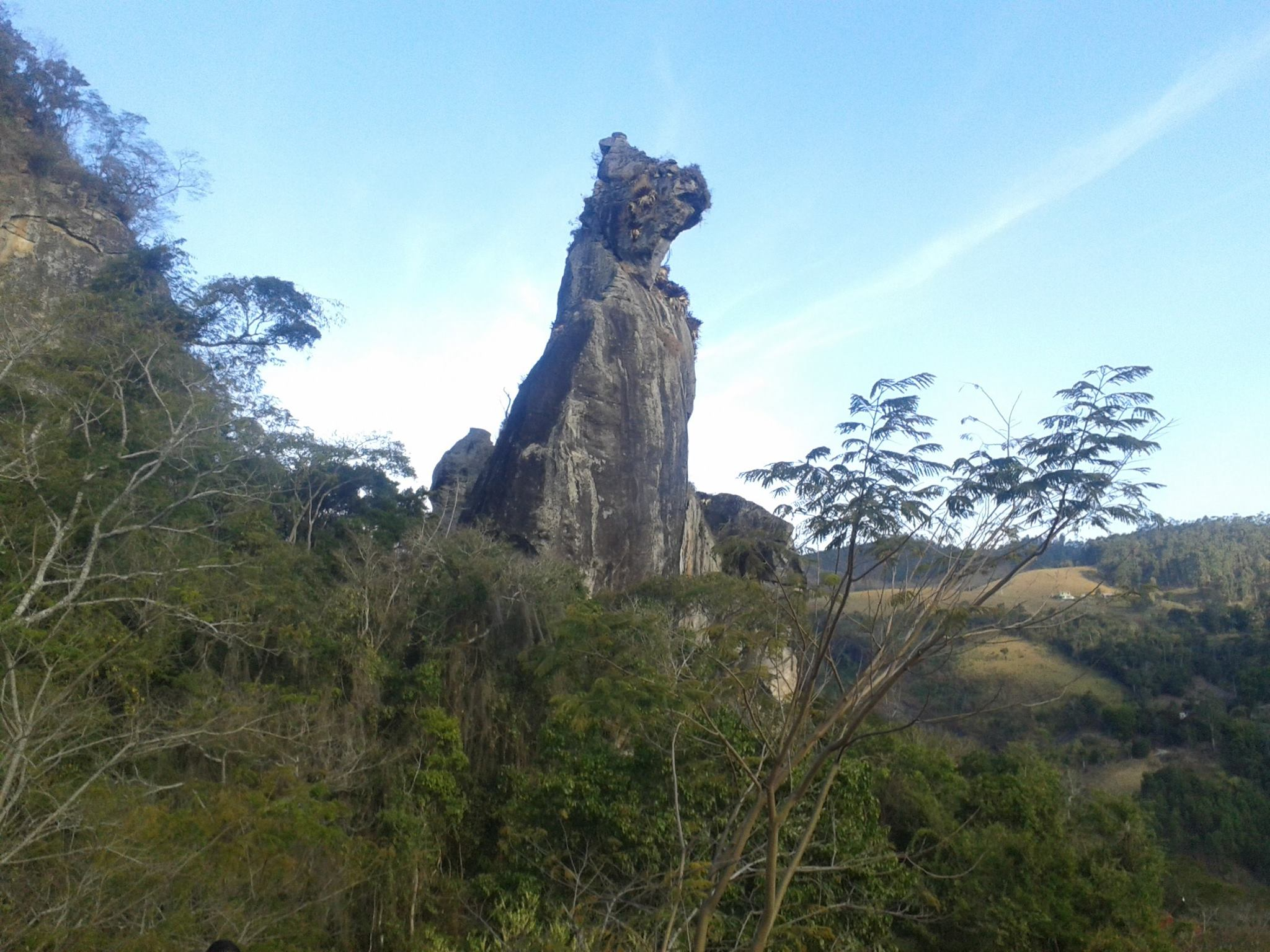

Geography

The Pedra do Cão Sentado (Rock of the Sitting Dog) is a natural monument considered a symbol of the city of Nova Friburgo.

== Location ==
The monument is located at RJ-116, connecting Nova Friburgo to the municipality of Bom Jardim.

== History ==
The park was established in 1962.
