= Riograndina =

District of Nova Friburgo

Coordinates: 22°11′53″S 42°30′42″W

Riograndina is the second district of the Rio de Janeiro municipality of Nova Friburgo, located in the northern part of the city.

In 2022, the population was estimated at 6 115 inhabitants according to the census conducted that year by the Brazilian Institute of Geography and Statistics (IBGE).

The neighborhood is home to the well-known Casarão de Riograndina.

== History ==
The district was established by Municipal Law No. 1809, dated January 25, 1924.

In the past, the neighborhood was crossed by the Cantagalo Line of the Leopoldina Railroad, which was used to transport coffee and provide local passenger service. The railroad line was decommissioned in 1964 and completely dismantled in 1967.
