= Ypu Factory =

Factory in Nova Friburgo

- Native name: Fábrica Ypu
- Founded: 1912
- Founder: Maximilian Falck and Willian Peacock Denis
- Defunct: Unknown
- Headquarters: Nova Friburgo, Rio de Janeiro, Brazil
- Products: textile and apparel
- Website: www.instagram.com/fabricaypu/

The Ypu Factory was a textile and manufactured goods industrial complex founded in 1912 in Nova Friburgo, in the state of Rio de Janeiro. It is located on Maximiliano Falck Avenue, in the Ypu neighborhood.

== Background ==
In the 20h century, two German businessmen, Maximilian Falck and William Peacock Denis, established a textile factory, transforming the economic, social, and urban structure of the city of Nova Friburgo.

Maximilian Falck started in 1912, the production of trimmings in a warehouse on the Ypu farm, along the banks of the Santo Antônio River, with modest production and few employees. It was after hiring Emil Cleff that the company expanded and diversified its production line, becoming a massive industrial complex spanning 44,000 square meters.

Fourteen looms were imported from Germany, and the raw materials came from abroad. Five years after it was founded, it had 155 workers trained by technicians from Germany.

Maximilian Falck died in 1944, leaving behind three heirs: Maximilian Falck Jr., Edith, and Cecília Falck. The factory shaped the town and gave rise to an entire neighborhood bearing the same name.

In 1954, the factory launched the famous Friburgo belt collection.

=== Emil Cleff ===
Emil Cleff

Emil Cleff was born in April 7 1869 in Barmen, Germany. He traveled to Brazil for the first time in 1893 to reorganize a textile factory in Bahia and returned to Europe after completing this consulting assignment. He founded a textile trimmings factory under the name Cleff & Cie in the town of Flinez-lez-Montagne, France. He had to flee the city during World War I, and shortly thereafter, his business was destroyed in the bombings.

He immigrated in 1921 to Nova Friburgo, where he became a partner at the Ypu Factory after being contacted by its founder, Maximilian Falck.

== Decline and Auction ==
After decades of significant success and family-run management, the factory faced financial crises and management disputes until it ceased its core operations.

== Products ==
The main products manufactured at the YPU plant are:

- Sianinha
- Guipure
- English embroidery
- Lace trim
- Cord
