= Amparo (Nova Friburgo) =

- City district
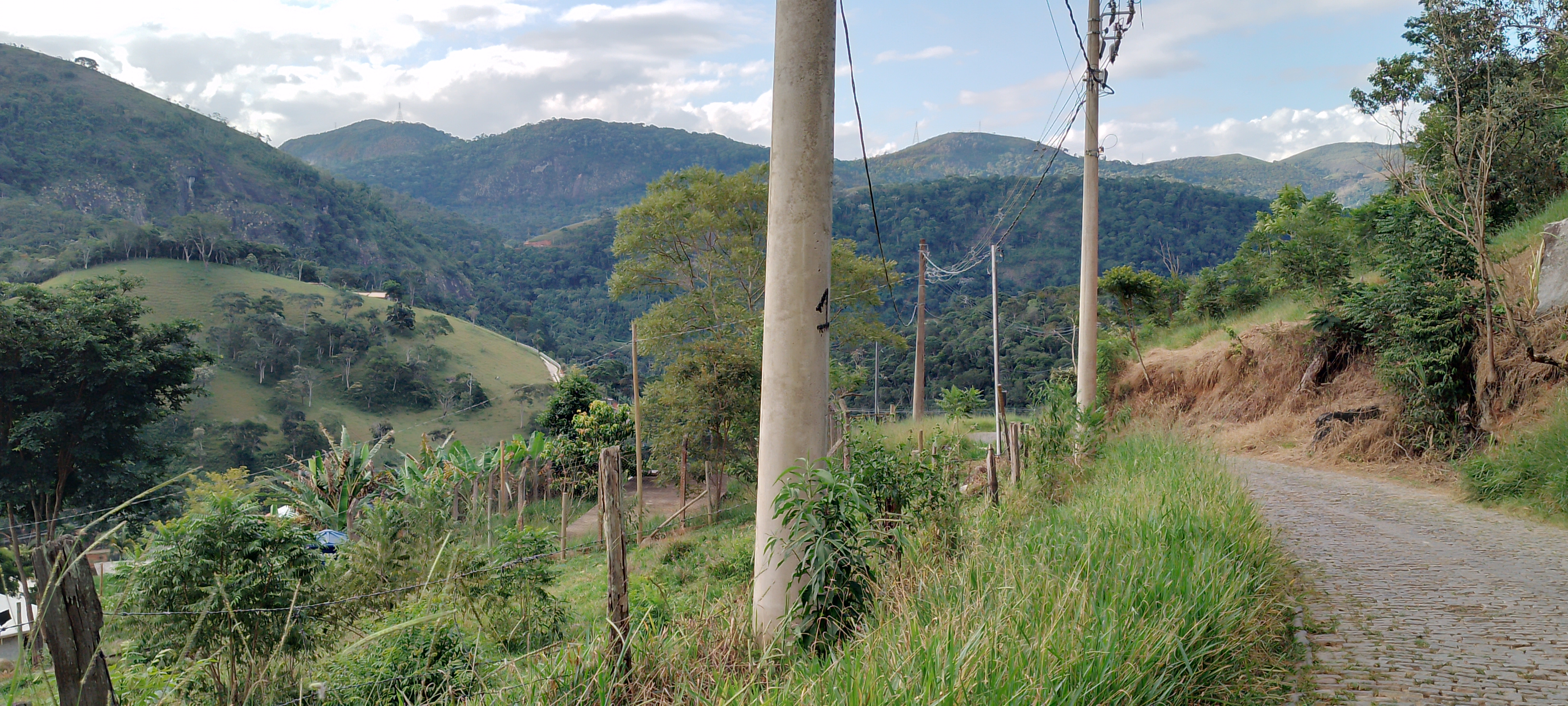
- Amparo in 2023
- Interactive map of Amparo
- Coordinates: 22°15′16″S 42°27′31″W
- Country: Brazil
- State: Rio de Janeiro
- City: Nova Friburgo

Amparo is the fourth district of the municipality of Nova Friburgo in the state of Rio de Janeiro.

Until the end of the 20th century, Amparo was predominantly rural. Today, it is becoming a residential neighborhood with tourist attractions.

== Demography ==
In 2022, the population was estimated at 4 696 inhabitants according to the census conducted that year by the Brazilian Institute of Geography and Statistics (IBGE).

== Geography ==
The biome of Amparo is the Atlantic Forest.
