= Mury (Nova Friburgo) =

- City district
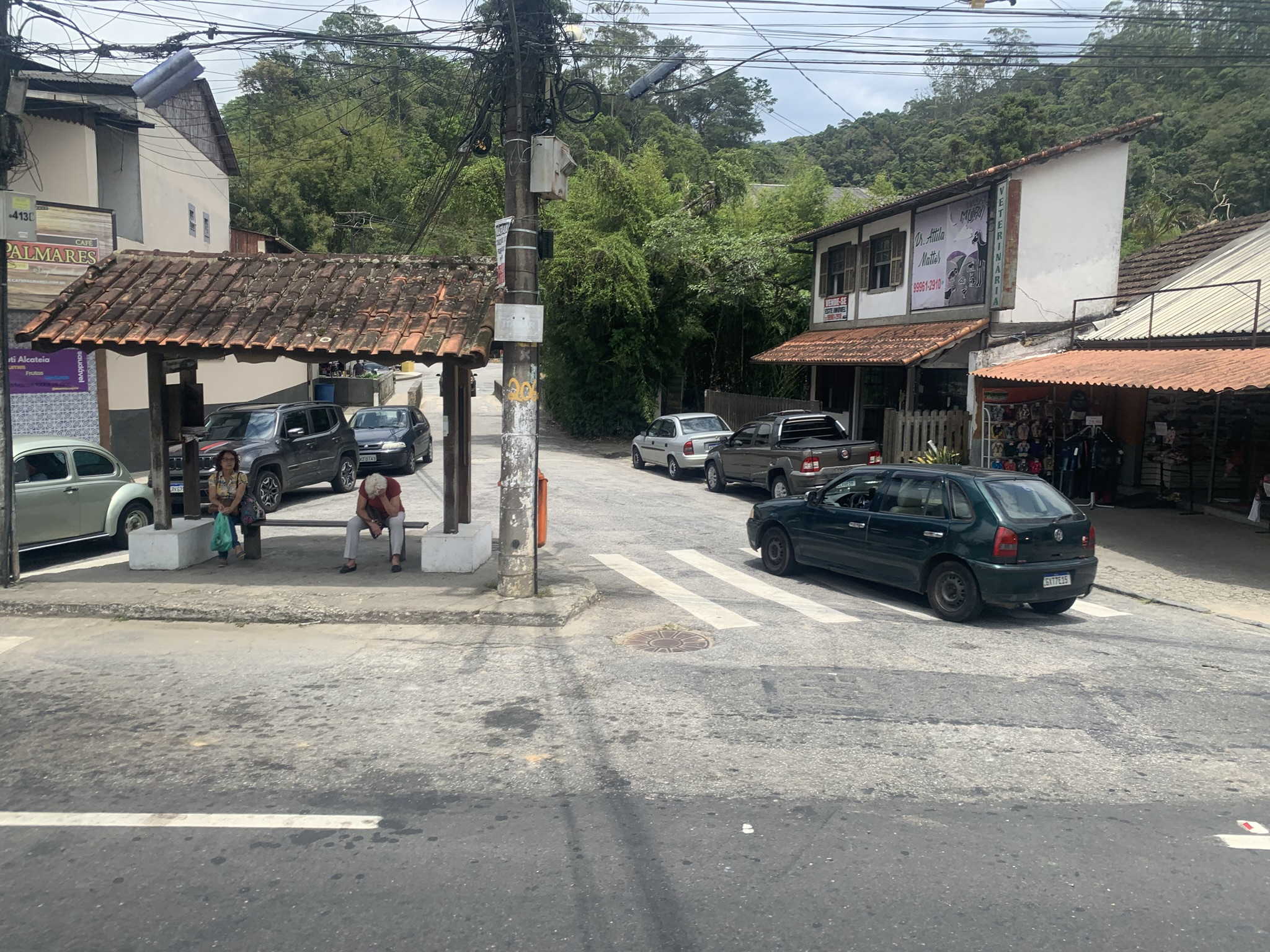
- Partial view of Mury
- Interactive map of Mury
- Coordinates: 22°20′18″S 42°31′01″W
- Country: Brazil
- State: Rio de Janeiro
- City: Nova Friburgo

Mury is the 8th district of the municipality of Nova Friburgo in the state of Rio de Janeiro.

It is located in the southern part of the municipality and, according to the IBGE's 2022 Census, has a population of 6,712.
