= St. John the Baptist Cathedral, Nova Friburgo =

Coordinates: 22°16′54″S 42°31′51″W

St. John the Baptist Cathedral
- Catedral São João Batista
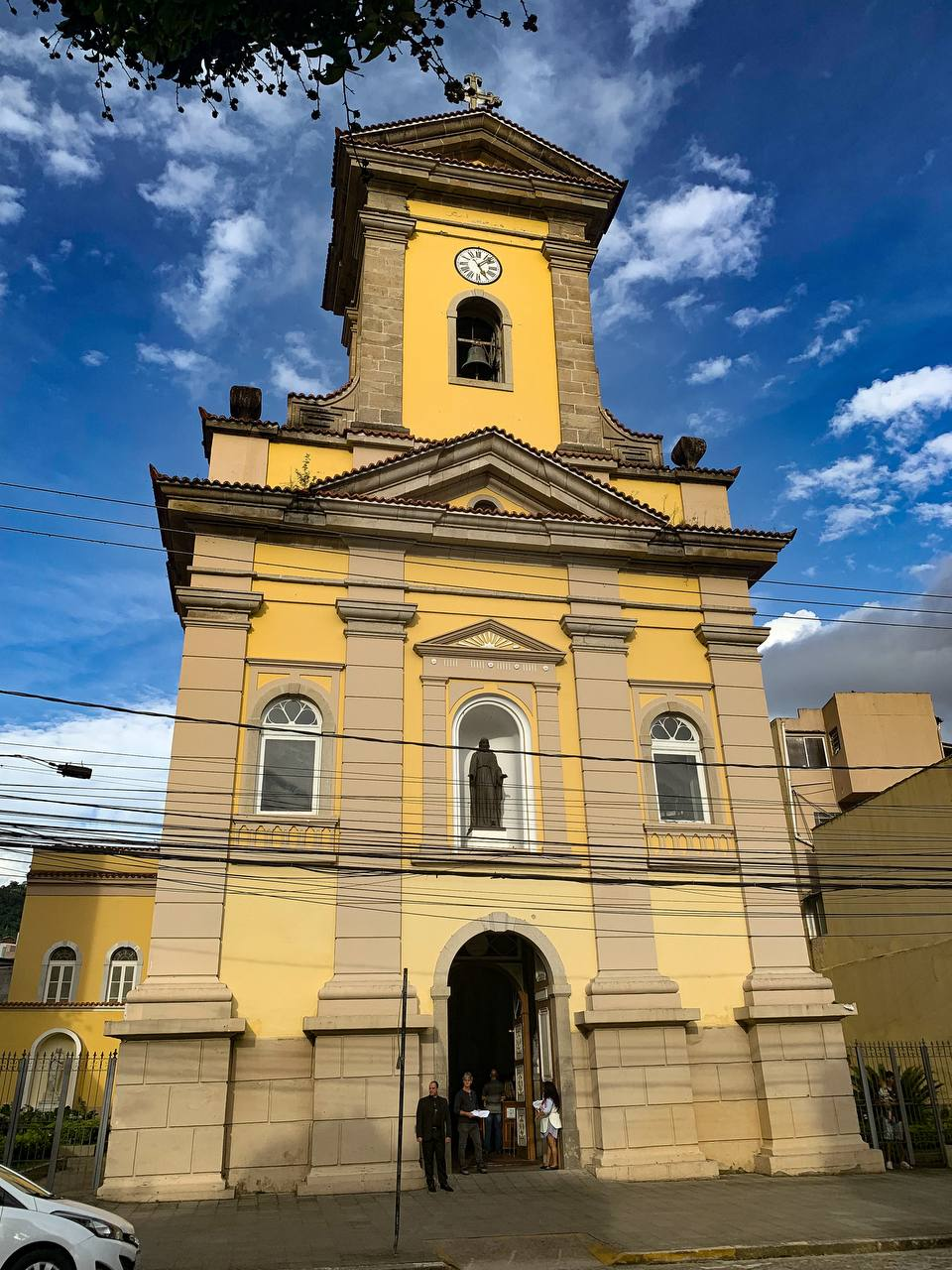
- St. John the Baptist Cathedral, Nova Friburgo
- Location: Nova Friburgo
- Country: Brazil
- Denomination: Roman Catholic Church

The St. John the Baptist Cathedral (Portuguese: Catedral São João Batista) is a Catholic church located in Nova Friburgo, in the state of Rio de Janeiro in Brazil. It falls under the pastoral responsibility of Bishop Luiz Antônio Lopes Ricci. It is listed by IPHAN.

It is one of the city's main tourist attractions.

== History ==
The Cathedral of St. John the Baptist was established on 3 January 1820 by a decree of Dom João VI, ratified on 11 January 1820 by the Bishop of Rio de Janeiro, Dom José Caetano da Silva Coutinho.

The church was built in 1861 and opened in 1869. In the 1980s, the Cathedral of St. John the Baptist was designated a heritage site by the city of Nova Friburgo and the state of Rio de Janeiro, receiving its listing from INEPAC.

In December 2019, the community celebrated the 150th anniversary of the church popularly known among Friburgo residents as the Mother Church.

== See also ==
- Catholic Church in Brazil
- John the Baptist
