= Casa & Video =

Department store chain in Rio de Janeiro

Casa & Vídeo Brasil SA

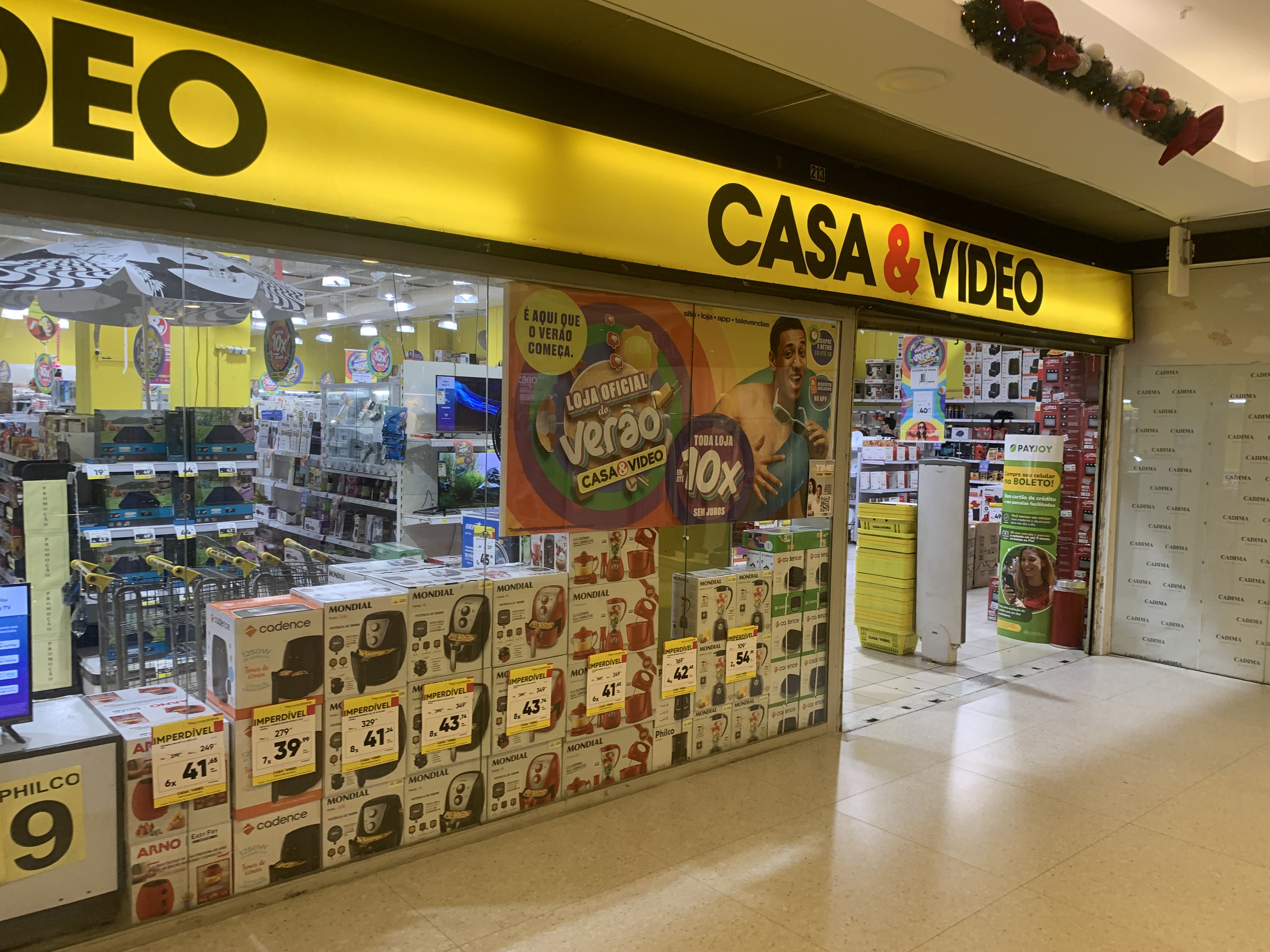
- Entrance to one of the shops
- Type: Private
- Industry: Retail
- Founded: Rio de Janeiro (1988)
- Headquarters: Rio de Janeiro, Brazil
- Number of locations: 241 stores (2025)
- Number of employees: 3500 (2010)
- Website: casaevideo.com.br

Casa & Vídeo (also written CASA&VIDEO) is a department store chain, founded in Rio de Janeiro in 1988. As of 2025, the company has more than 220 stores in various cities in the four states of southeastern Brazil.

The business begun in 1988, when a store was opened in the 5th floor of a building in Copacabana, selling television mounts and, soon later, ceiling fans. The name of the store came from these products they used to sell: CASA ("Home", in Portuguese), from the utility of the fans, and VIDEO, from the TV mounts.

In 2008, when it had 70 stores, became involved in a financial crisis after the arrest of executives and seizure of goods by Federal Police. The chain then had its assets and liabilities disposed judicially.

The chain resumed operations in 2009, as part of a judicial reorganization plan. Lojas Americanas negotiated the purchase of Casa & Video, but the deal did not happen.
