= Campo do Coelho =

- City district
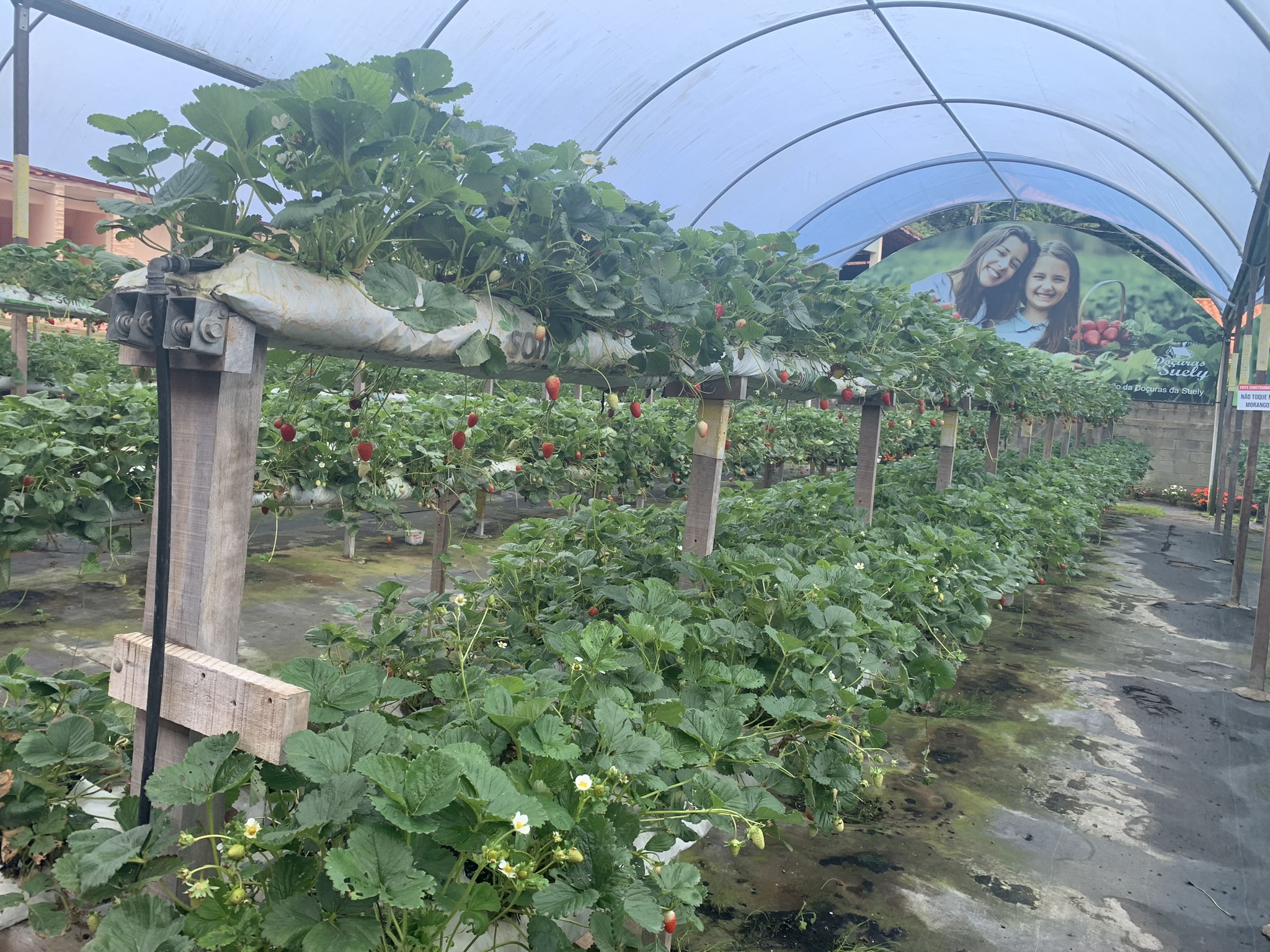
- Strawberry plantation
- Interactive map of Campo do Coelho
- Coordinates: 22°15′12″S 42°36′42″W
- Country: Brazil
- State: Rio de Janeiro
- City: Nova Friburgo

The Campo do Coelho is the 3rd district of the municipality of Nova Friburgo in the state of Rio de Janeiro.

== Demography ==
In 2022, the population was estimated at 12 681 inhabitants according to the census conducted that year by the Brazilian Institute of Geography and Statistics (IBGE).

== Geography ==
It is located in the western part of the city.

The biome of Campo do Coelho is the Atlantic Forest.

== Tourism ==
The tourist attractions in the Campo do Coelho district include:

- Casa Suíça
- Jardim do Nêgo
- Doçuras da Suely
