= Nova Friburgo =

- Municipality
- Municipality of Nova Friburgo
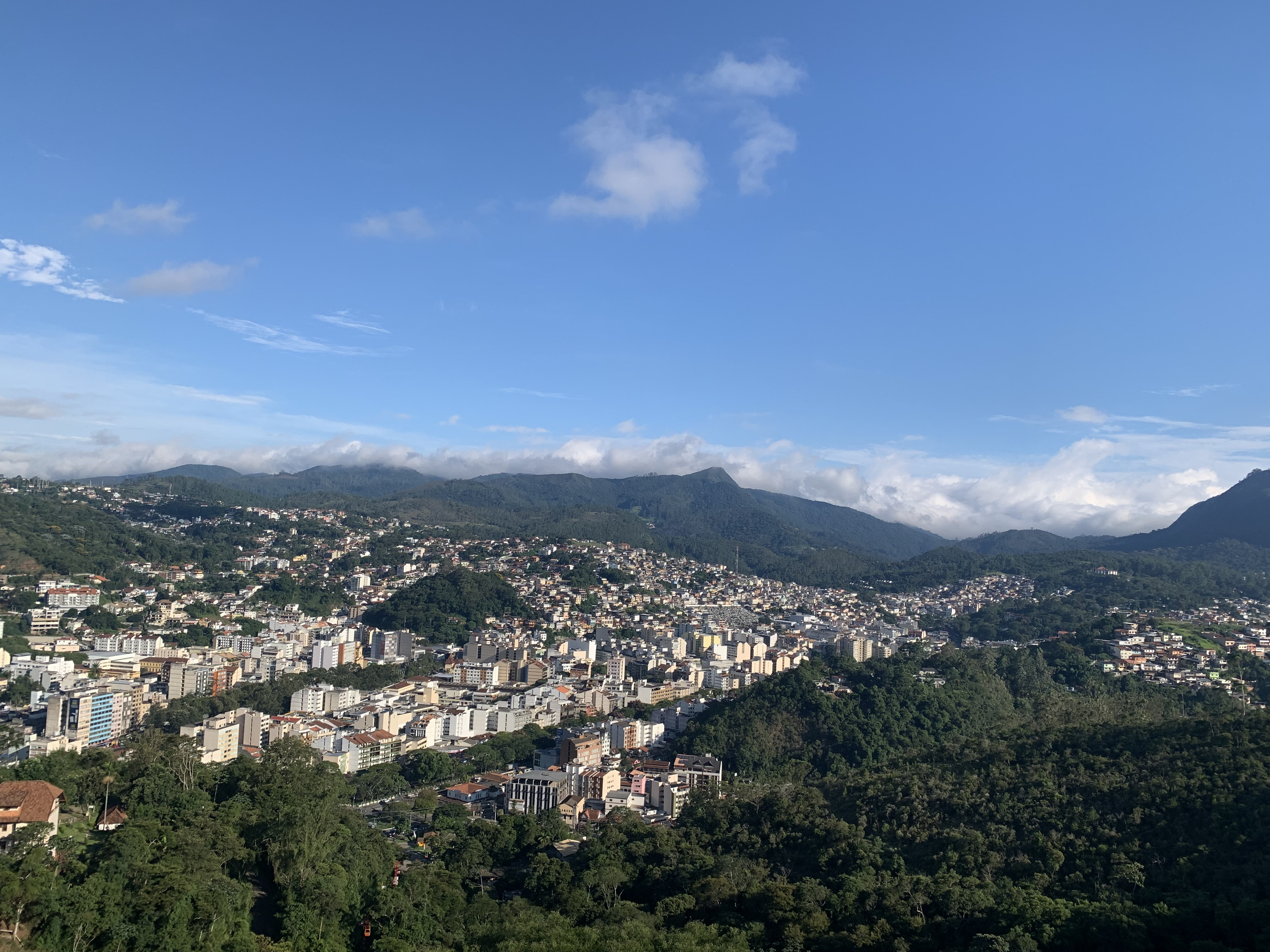
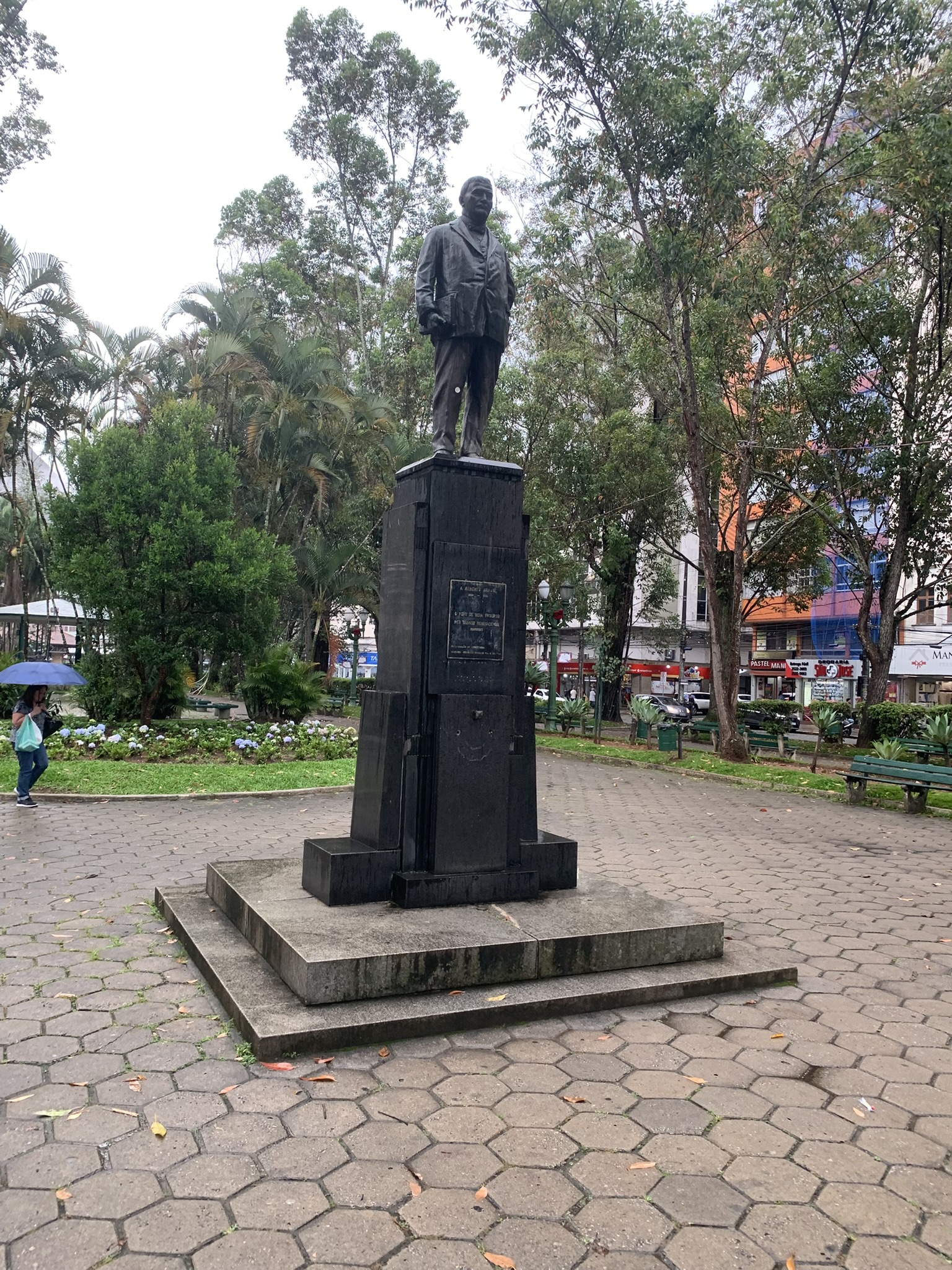
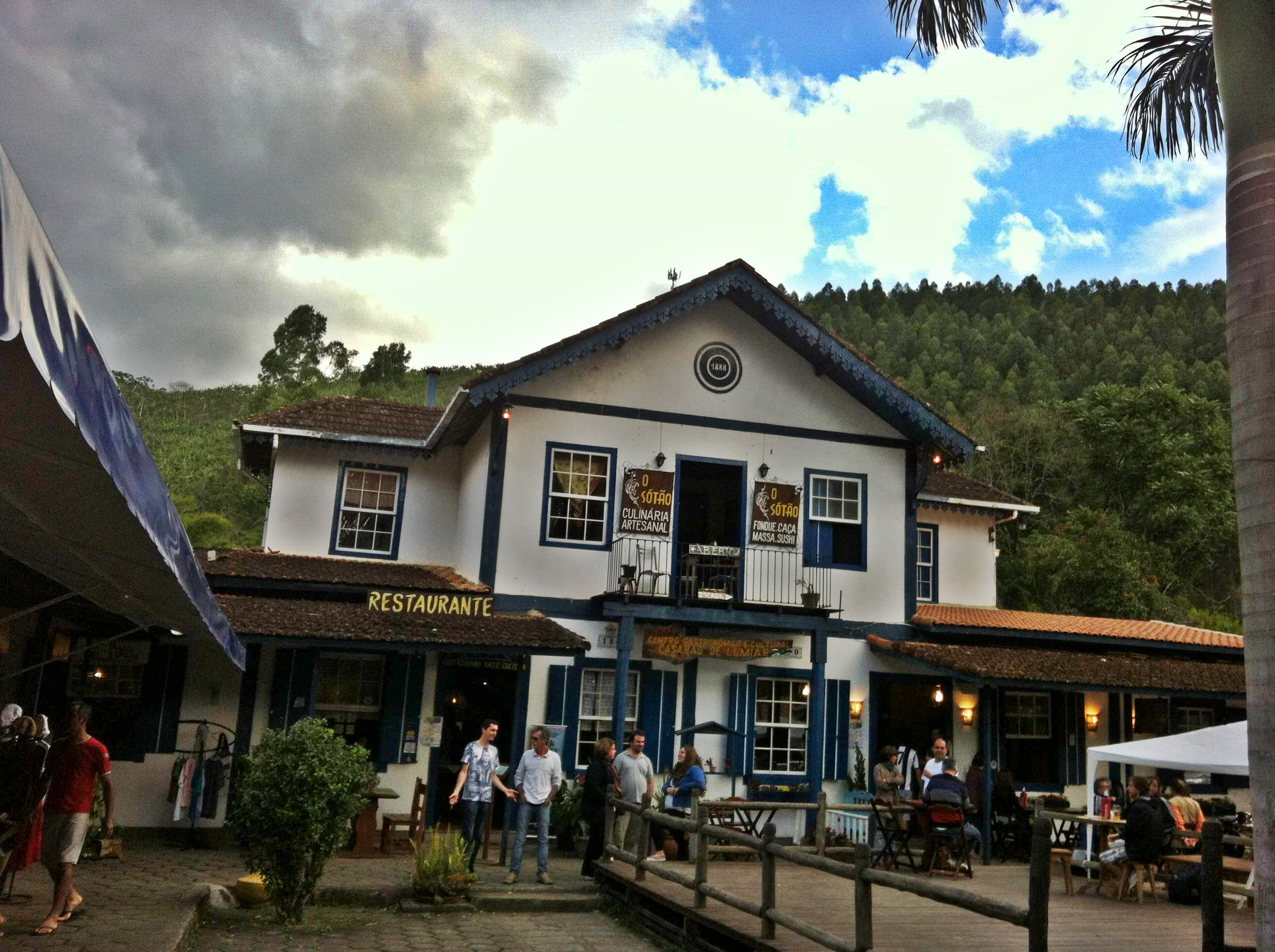
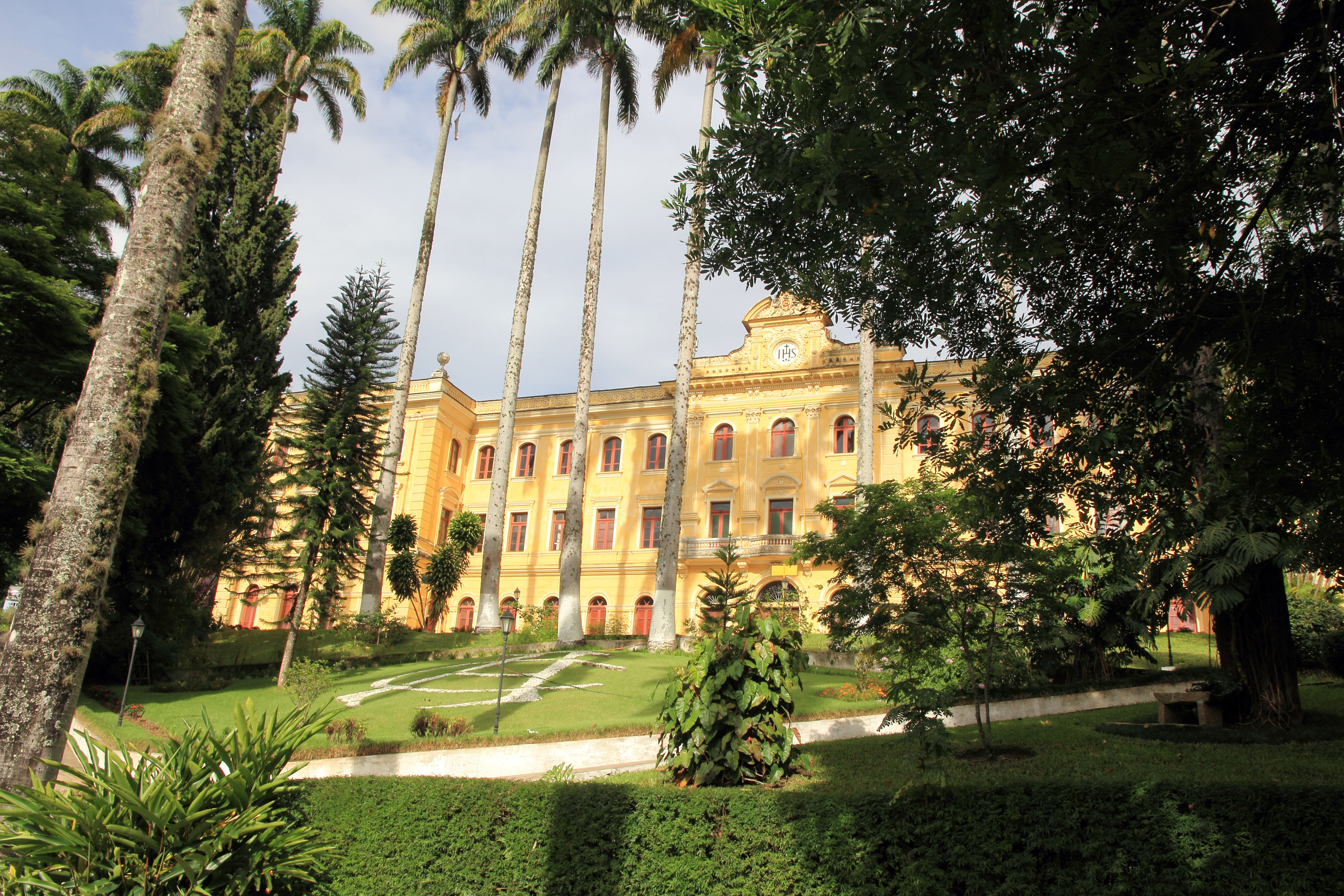
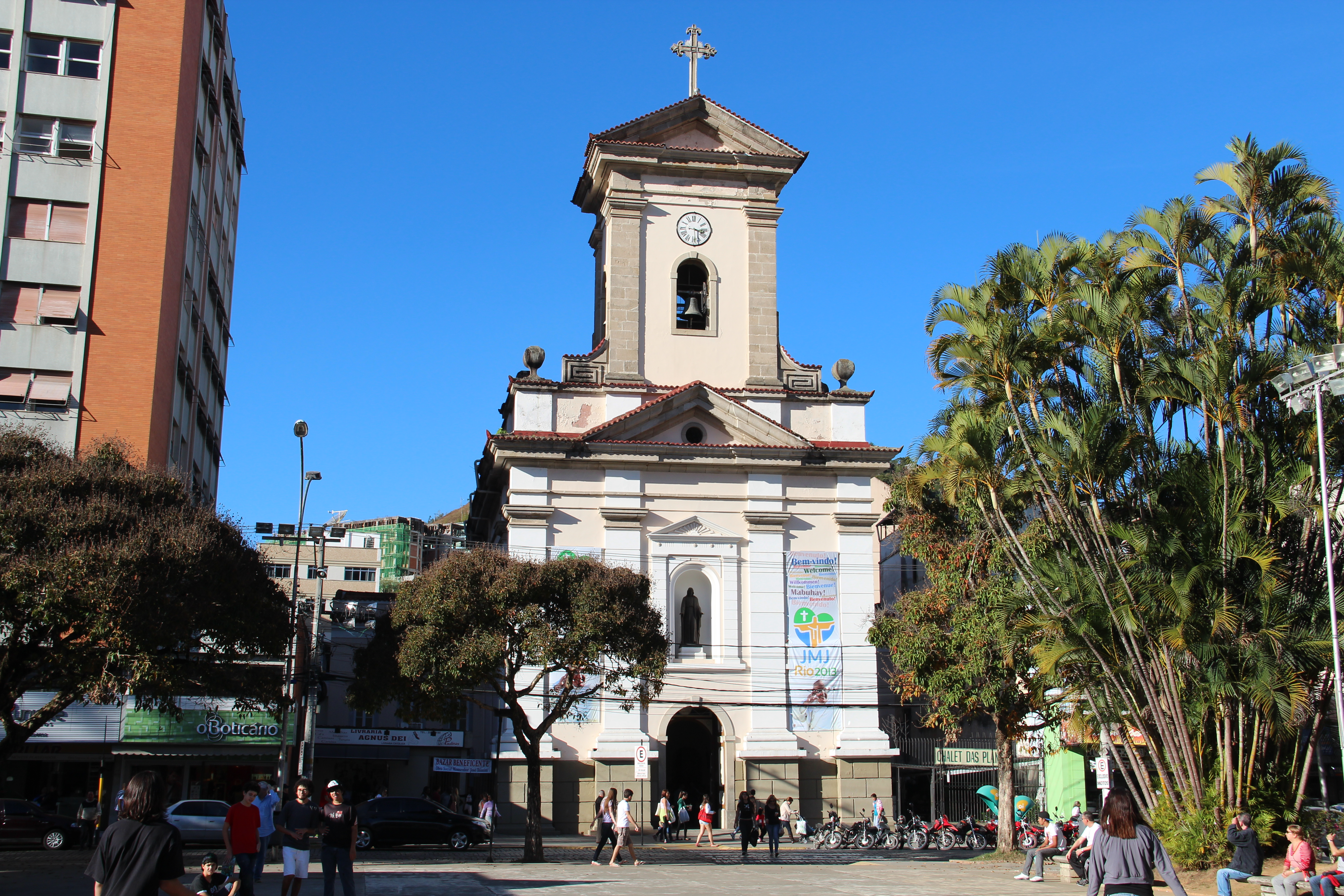
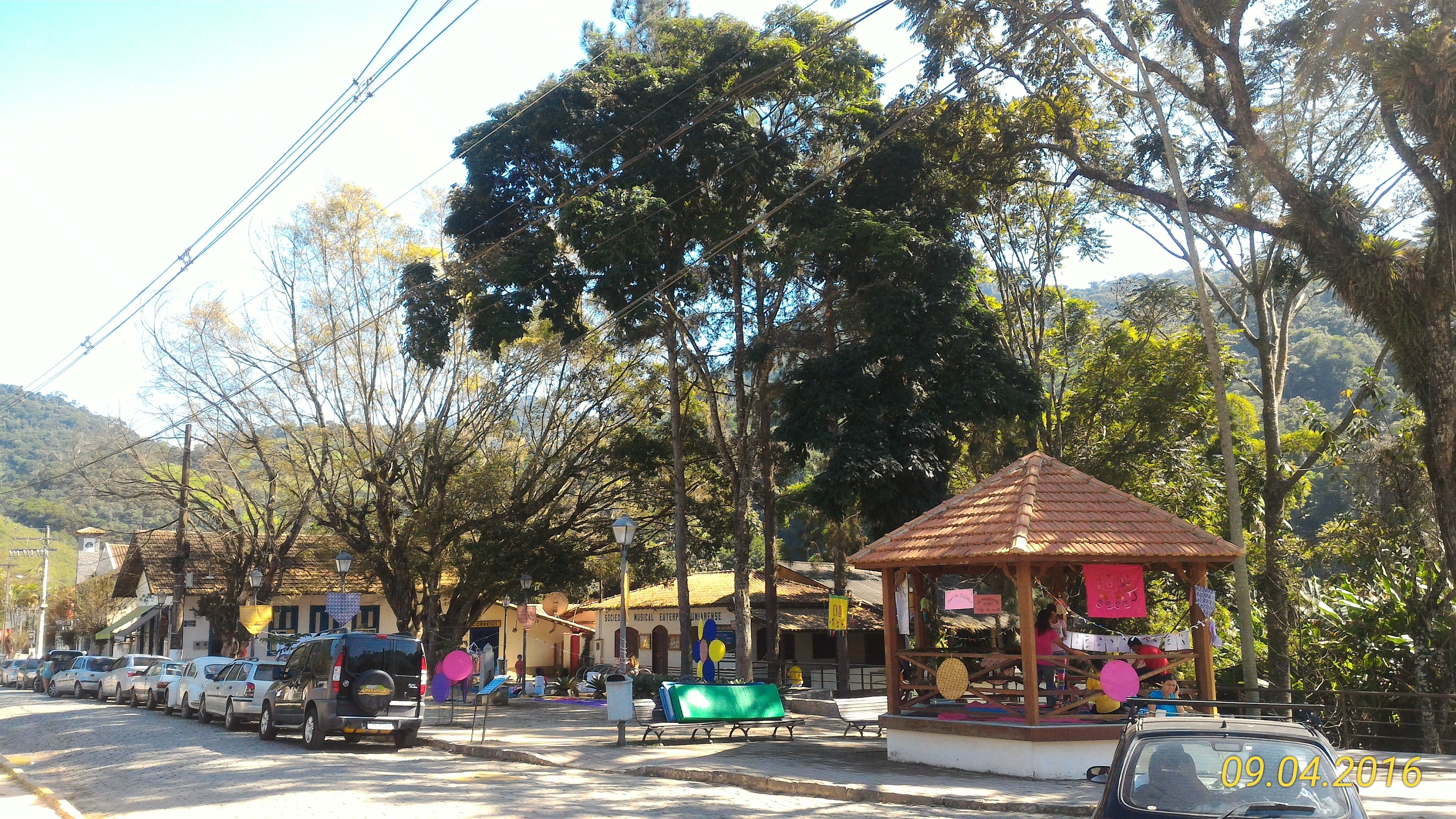
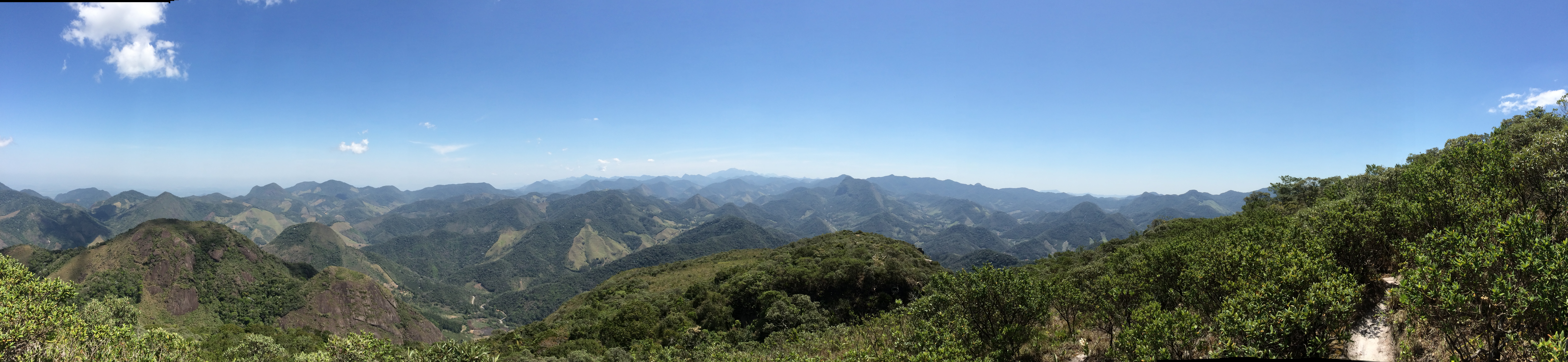

- Flag Coat of arms

- Location in Rio de Janeiro state

- Location in Brazil
- Coordinates: 22°16′55″S 42°31′52″W
- Country: Brazil
- Region: Southeast
- State: Rio de Janeiro
- Founded: 16 May 1818

Government
  - Body: Nova Friburgo Municipal Chamber
  - Mayor: Johnny Maycon (PL)
  - Term ends: 2028

Area
  - Municipality: 935.429 km^{2} (361.171 sq mi)
  - Urban: 45.66 km^{2} (17.63 sq mi)
- Elevation: 846 m (2,776 ft)

Population (2022 Brazilian Census)
  - Municipality: 189,939
  - Estimate (2026): 203,460
  - Rank: BR: 159rd RJ: 16th
  - Density: 203.050/km^{2} (525.897/sq mi)
- Demonym: Friburguense
- Time zone: UTC−3 (BRT)
- HDI (2010): 0.745 – high
- Website: Official website

Nova Friburgo (Portuguese: [ˈnɔvɐ fɾiˈbuʁɡu]; German: Neufreiburg [nɔʏˈfʁaɪbʊʁk]; English: "New Fribourg"), commonly referred to as just Friburgo, is a Brazilian municipality in the state of Rio de Janeiro located 136 kilometres (85 miles) from the state capital. It covers an area of 935.429 km², and its population was estimated at 203 417 in 2025, making it the 16th most populous in the state.

The city has an average annual temperature of 18.1 °C, and the Atlantic Forest is the predominant vegetation type in the municipality. In 2022 there were 133,702 vehicles in the city. Its Human Development Index (HDI) is 0,745, considering it to be very high compared to the state.

The main economic activities are based on: lingerie, horticulture, goat farming, and industry (textiles, apparel, and the metalworking sector), as well as tourism. It is also the coldest city in the state.

In 1 July 2024, the then-president of Brazil Luiz Inácio Lula da Silva, signed into law No. 14,910, which designates the city as the "Brazilian Switzerland".

== History ==
=== Early Settlement (1818–1822) ===
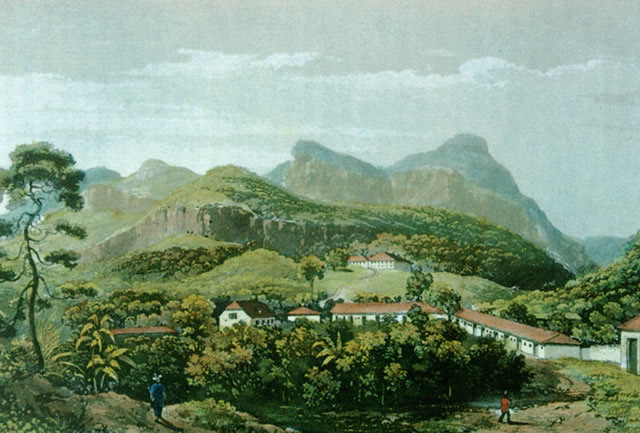
Nova Friburgo during Swiss and German settlement, 1820–1830.

Up to the 19th century, the region of the present Nova Friburgo was inhabited by Coroado Purí Indians. In 1818, seeking to improve relations with Germany to obtain its support against the French empire, King John VI proposed the creation of a planned settlement in Brazil. A royal decree of May 1818, authorized the Canton of Fribourg of Switzerland, to establish a colony of 100 Swiss families in the Morro Queimado Farm, in Cantagalo District, a place with climate and natural characteristics similar to those in their country.

=== Expansion and Growth (1822–1890) ===
Between 1819 and 1820, the region was settled by 265 Swiss families, in total 1,458 immigrants. It was named Nova Friburgo (New Fribourg) by the Swiss after the homeland of most of the families.

Following the Independence of Brazil in 1822, the Imperial Government continued the policy of populating the nation by attracting European colonization. Eighty German families previously assigned to settlements in the Province of Bahia, for unknown reasons ended up in Nova Friburgo, where they arrived on the 3 and 4 May 1824. Similar arrivals of Italians, Portuguese and a minority of Syrians led to such population increases that the once village was elevated to city status on 8 January 1890.

=== Industrialization and Development (1872–present) ===
In 1872, the Baron of Nova Friburgo brought to the region the Leopoldina Railroad, to allow for the flow of the coffee from Cantagalo. Agriculture was the basis of economic activity until 1910, when the arrival of industrialists pioneered the development of an industrial sector still thriving to the present day. The textile industry was led by three industrialists known as the “Teutonic Trinity”: Peter Julius Ferdinand Arp, Maximilianus Falck, and Otto Siems, founders, respectively, of the Arp Lace Factory, Ypu Textiles, Leather, and Metal Products, S.A., and the Filó Factory. Both the capital and the machinery needed for this industry were imported from Germany. The demand for skilled labor led to the immigration of other German technicians and, during World War I, even of German sailors who had initially been detained at the Nova Friburgo Naval Sanatorium as prisoners. In addition to creating jobs, the industry contributed to the city’s development by promoting access to electricity. Entire neighborhoods were even built around the workers’ villages, such as the Ypu neighborhood, which takes its name from the Ypu Factory.

=== Tourism and Commerce ===
Of similar importance was the relative proximity to Niterói and Rio de Janeiro and the improvement of transport and communication links such as paved roads and telegraph. This encouraged a small tourist industry to grow, which, together with local commerce, became the main source of income for the city.

== Geography ==
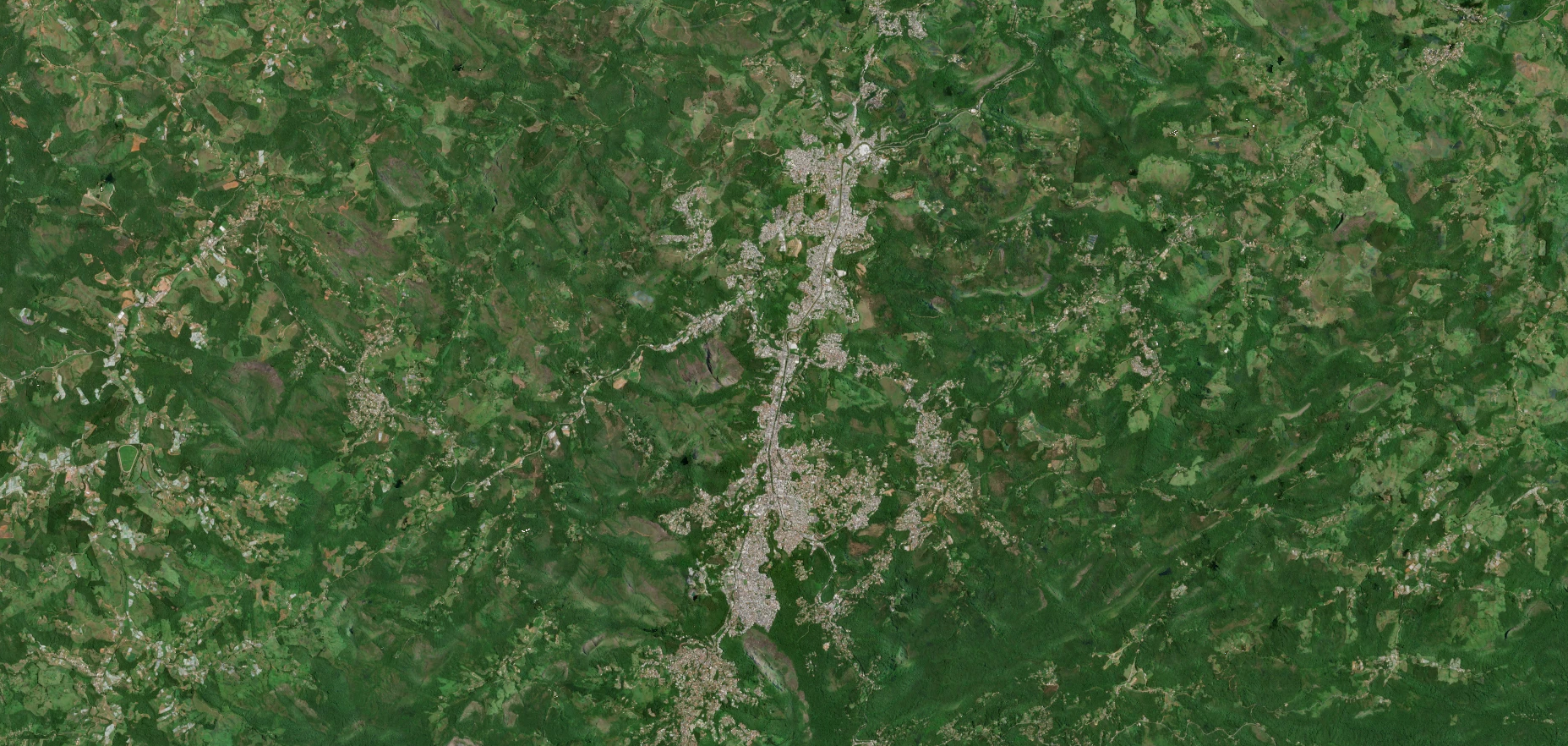
Nova Friburgo seen from Sentinel-2

According to the Brazilian Institute of Geography and Statistics (IBGE) in 2022, the municipality covers an area of 935.429 km², of which 43.43 km² is urban. It is located at 22° 16' 55" S south latitude and 42° 31' 51" W west longitude. Its neighboring municipalities are: Cachoeiras de Macacu, Silva Jardim, Casimiro de Abreu, Macaé, Trajano de Morais, Bom Jardim, Duas Barras, Sumidouro, and Teresópolis.

According to the regional division in effect since 2017, established by the IBGE, the municipality belongs to the Petrópolis Intermediate Geographic Region and the Nova Friburgo Immediate Geographic Region. Until then, under the system of micro-regions and meso-regions, it was part of the Nova Friburgo micro-region, which in turn was part of the Centro Fluminense meso-region.

=== Topography, hydrography, and the environment ===
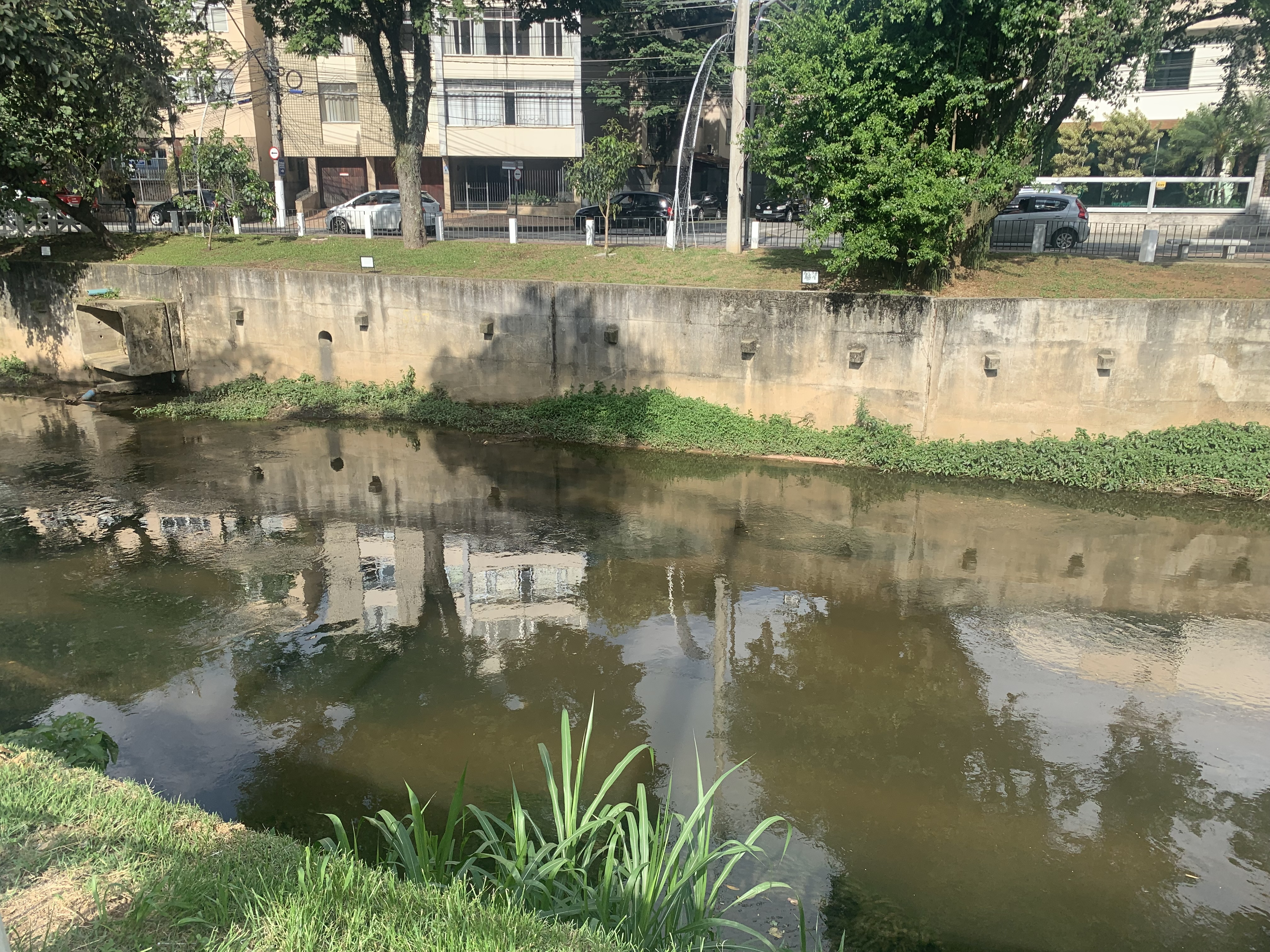
Bengalas River

The terrain of Nova Friburgo is predominantly mountainous, featuring hills and peaks, and the elevation is over 200 meters above sea level. The highest point is Pico Maior de Friburgo, which rises to 2,366 meters, while the minimum altitude is 846 meters.

The main watercourse that flows through Nova Friburgo is the Bengalas River. The municipality is part of the Grande River basin.

Sometimes, during the rainy season, the rivers that flow through the municipality, especially the Bengalas River, experience rising water levels, causing flooding along their banks, which necessitates an effective flood warning system. The city was one of the areas most affected by the 2011 floods.

=== Climate ===
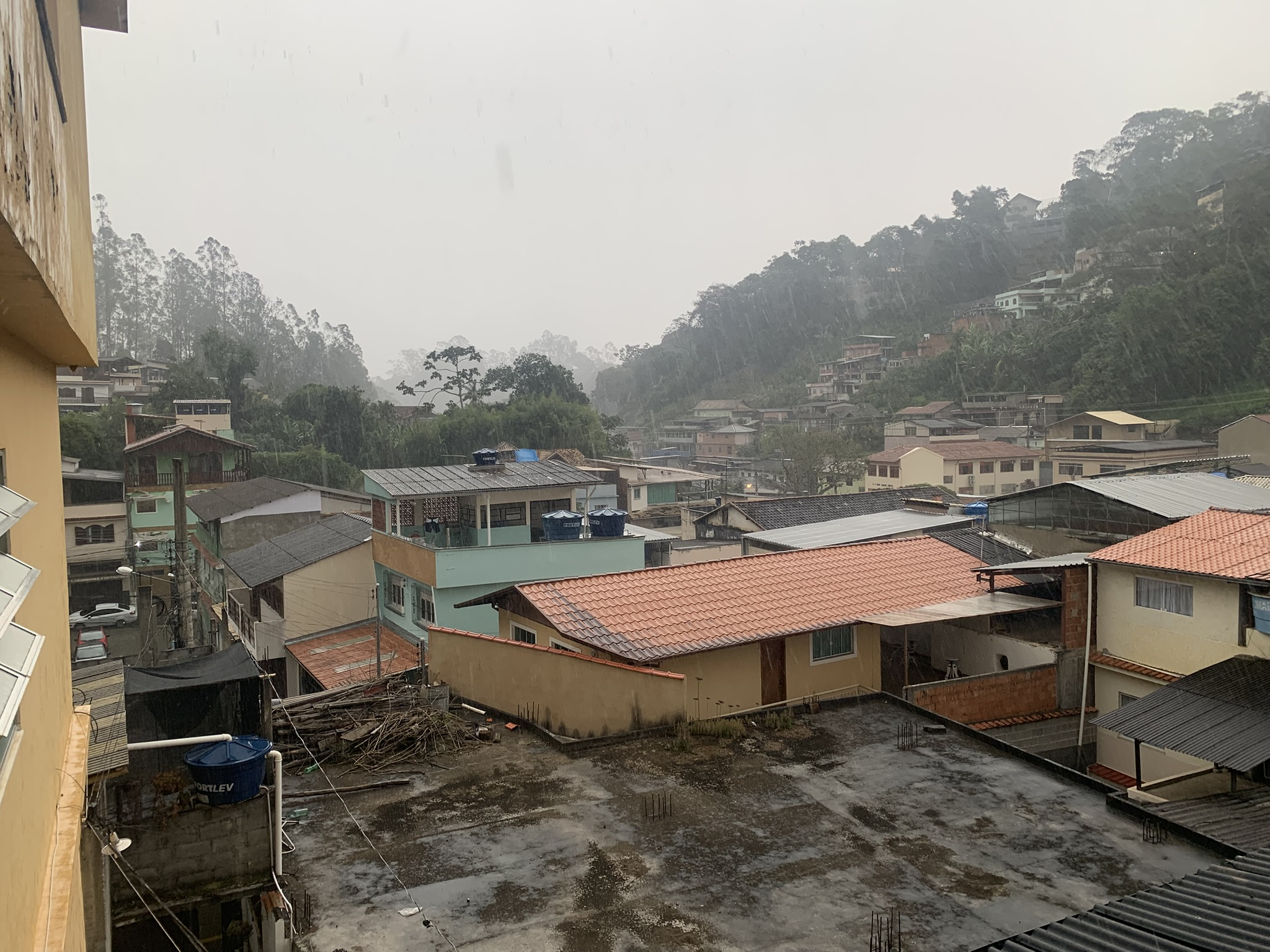
Rain in the Catarcione neighborhood on November 29, 2024

According to the Köppen-Geiger climate classification, the climate is characterized as mild mesothermal (Cfb). According to data from the National Institute of Meteorology (INMET) covering the period from 1961 to 2003, the lowest temperature recorded in Nova Friburgo was 1 °C on four occasions: twice in June 1968, on the 1st and 28th, and the other two on June 7, 1969, and July 22, 1981. However, outside of that period, more recently, the absolute minimum temperature in the municipality was −1.1 °C on September 4, 2011, and August 8, 2014, at the institute’s automatic weather station.

Also according to INMET, during the periods from 1961 to 1983 and from 2002 to 2003, the highest 24-hour rainfall total was 165.4 mm on December 16, 1966. Other high totals included 125.8 mm on October 20, 1962, 113 mm on January 24, 1964, 108.6 mm on January 13, 1978, 105.6 mm on November 28, 1978, and 103.8 mm on December 24, 1966. January 1964, with 503.7 mm, was the month with the highest precipitation.

Climate data for Nova Friburgo
Month	Jan	Feb	Mar	Apr	May	Jun	Jul	Aug	Sep	Oct	Nov	Dec	Year
Mean daily maximum °C (°F)	35.2 (95.4)	33.3 (91.9)	35.8 (96.4)	33.6 (92.5)	32.2 (90.0)	29.4 (84.9)	30.2 (86.4)	33 (91)	33.6 (92.5)	35 (95)	36 (97)	34 (93)	36 (97)
Mean daily minimum °C (°F)	17.8 (64.0)	17.7 (63.9)	17.5 (63.5)	16.1 (61.0)	13.0 (55.4)	10.6 (51.1)	9.9 (49.8)	10.8 (51.4)	12.9 (55.2)	14.9 (58.8)	16.2 (61.2)	17.0 (62.6)	14.5 (58.1)
Average precipitation mm (inches)	232.1 (9.14)	165.2 (6.50)	154.6 (6.09)	61.4 (2.42)	39.8 (1.57)	32.3 (1.27)	24.7 (0.97)	23.7 (0.93)	52.4 (2.06)	86.3 (3.40)	186.1 (7.33)	221.2 (8.71)	1,279.8 (50.39)
Average precipitation days (≥ 1.0 mm)	14	11	11	7	5	5	4	3	5	9	12	14	100
Average relative humidity (%)	77	78	78	82	82	83	83	81	80	81	80	80	80
Mean monthly sunshine hours	153.2	136.6	157.3	133.2	158.7	132.0	149.1	166.1	139.4	97.3	109.2	143.5	1,675.6
Source: Source: National Institute of Meteorology (climatological norm for 1981–2010); Precipitation, relative humidity, and hours of sunshine: 1961–1990 climatological norm;, temperature records: February 1, 1961, to February 28, 2003).

=== Districts ===
The municipality is divided into eight districts: Sede, Riograndina, Campo do Coelho, Amparo, Lumiar, Conselheiro Paulino, São Pedro da Serra, and Mury. According to city hall, in 2022 the city consisted of 40 neighborhoods, the most populous of which were Olaria (15,103 residents), Centro (14,233 residents), and Conselheiro Paulino (12,943 residents).

== Demographics ==
Nova Friburgo
Year	Pop.	±%
1970	90,420	—
1980	123,386	+36.5%
1991	167,081	+35.4%
2000	173,418	+3.8%
2010	182,082	+5.0%
2022	189,939	+4.3%

In 2022, the population was estimated at 189 939 inhabitants according to the census conducted that year by the Brazilian Institute of Geography and Statistics (IBGE). Of the total, 87 254 were men and 94 828 were women. According to the 2010 census, 159 372 inhabitants lived in the urban area and 22 710 in the rural area (16.1%). It is the 16th most populous city in the state, and has a population density of 203,05 inhabitants per square kilometer.

The main language spoken in Nova Friburgo is Brazilian Portuguese, which is the only official language of Brazil, according to the 1988 Constitution.

In the year 2022, 6,8% of the city's population has some form of disability, while 1.2% of the population has been diagnosed with an autism spectrum disorder.

Nova Friburgo's Human Development Index (HDI-M) is considered high by the United Nations Development Programme (PNUD), with a value of 0,745, ranking 648º in Brazil and 13º in Rio de Janeiro. Most of the city's indicators are close to the national average, according to the PNUD. The education index is 0,645, longevity is 0,846, and income is 0,758.

From 2000 to 2010, 3,51% of the population lived above the poverty line, 9.3% were at the poverty line, and 1,28% were below it. The Gini coefficient, which measures social inequality, was 0,42, where 1.00 is the worst and 0.00 is the best. The share of the city's total income held by the wealthiest 20% of the population was 56,57%, or 12,29 times higher than that of the poorest 20%, which was 4,8%.

=== Religion ===
According to the 2010 IBGE census, the municipal population included 86 882 Catholics, 51 384 evangelicals, 41 Jews, 6,404 Spiritists, 26,598 people with no religious affiliation, and 393 who do not know. The municipality is home to the episcopal see of the Diocese of Nova Friburgo, which is the St. John the Baptist Cathedral, comprising 19 municipalities.

==== Cathedral of St. John the Baptist ====
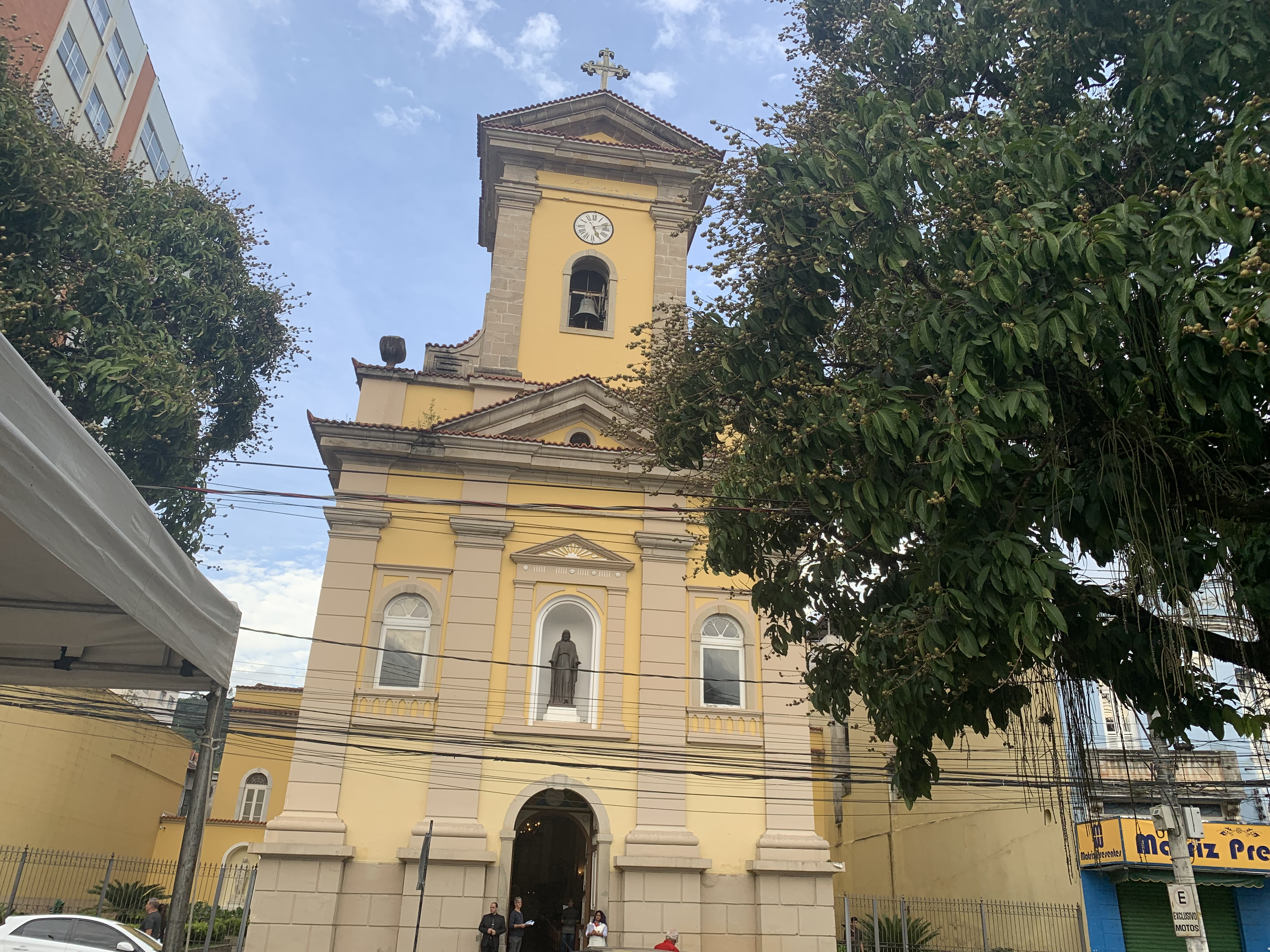
St. John the Baptist Cathedral in 2024

The St. John the Baptist Cathedral was established on 3 January 1820 by a decree of Dom João VI, ratified on 11 January 1820 by the Bishop of Rio de Janeiro, Dom José Caetano da Silva Coutinho.

The church was built in 1861 and opened in 1869. In the 1980s, the Cathedral of St. John the Baptist was designated a heritage site by the city of Nova Friburgo and the state of Rio de Janeiro, receiving its listing from INEPAC.

In December 2019, the community celebrated the 150th anniversary of the church popularly known among Friburgo residents as the Mother Church.

=== Protestant Church ===
Among the historic Protestant, Pentecostal, and Neo-Pentecostal churches in the city are:

- Foursquare Church
- Christian Congregation in Brazil
- Assemblies of God

== Economy ==
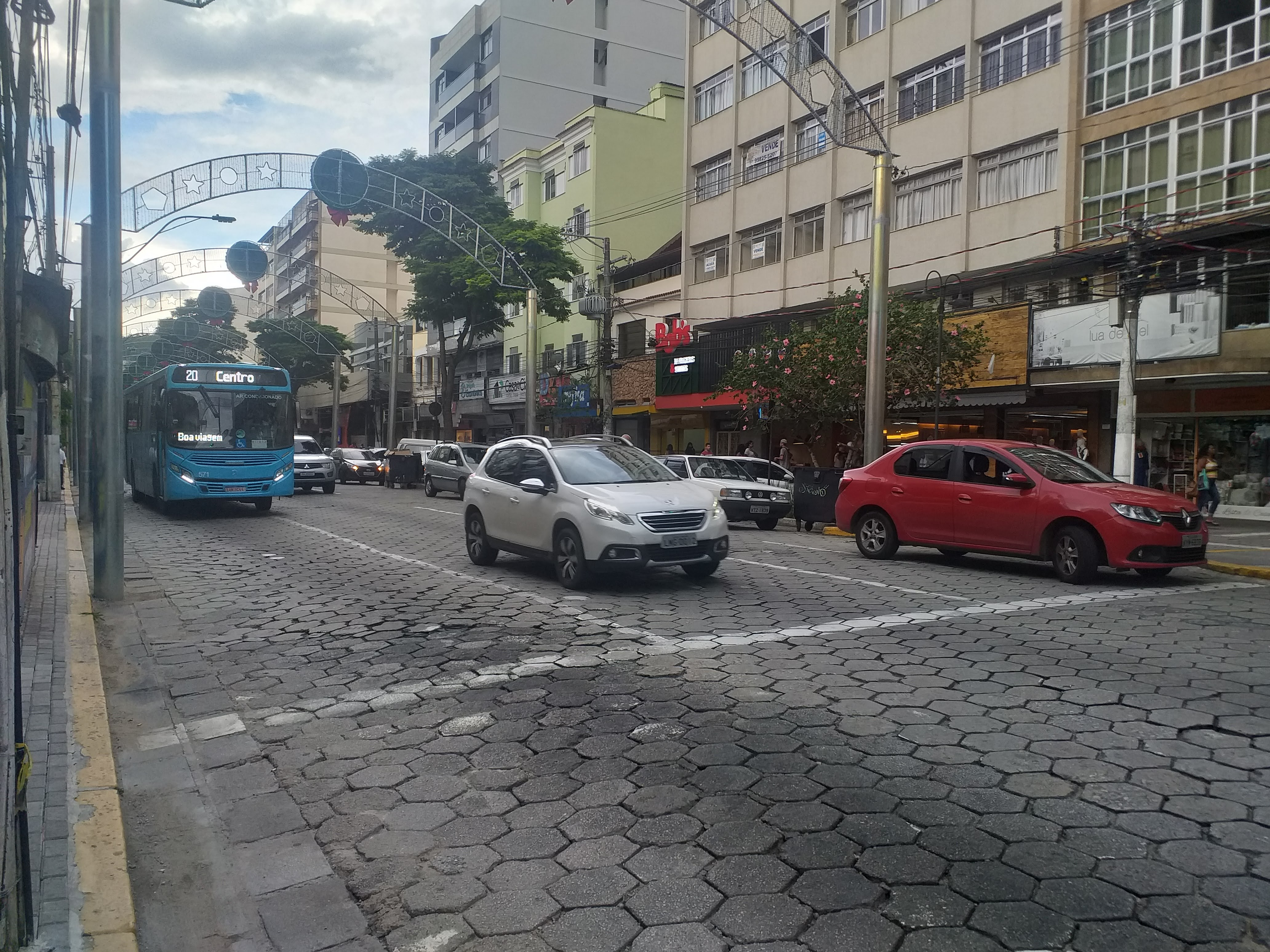
Avenue Alberto Braune, in the center of Nova Friburgo in 2024

In the Gross Domestic Product (GDP) of Nova Friburgo, the industrial and service sectors stand out, though agribusiness also plays a significant role, particularly coffee production.

In 2021, wages and other compensation totaled 1,274,274 thousand reais, and the average monthly wage for the entire municipality was 1.8 times the minimum wage. There were 7,893 local establishments and 7,506 active companies.

=== Primary sector ===
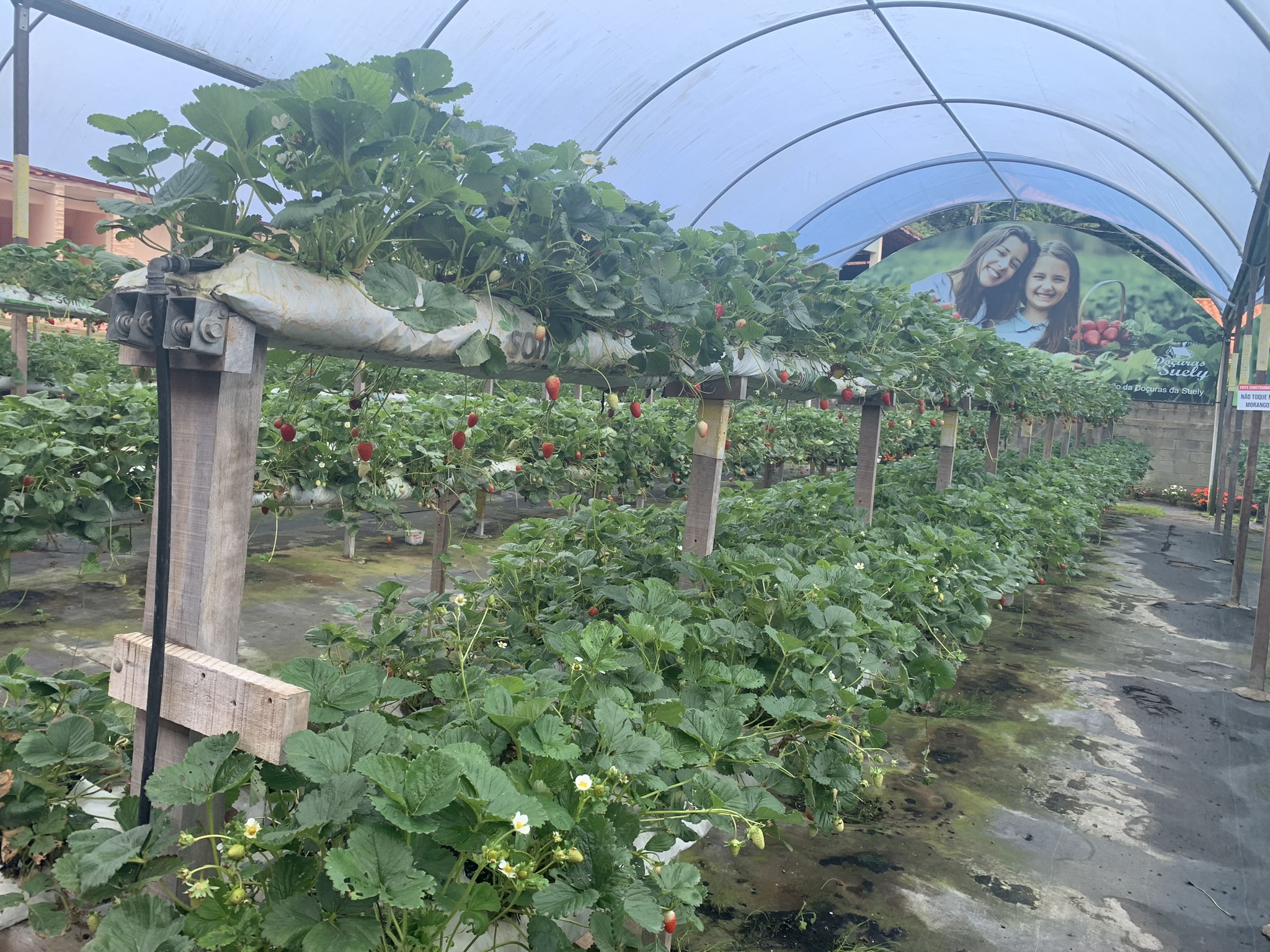
Strawberry farm in the Campo do Coelho district

In 2021, livestock and agriculture contributed 130.267,26 thousand reais to Nova Friburgo's economy, while in 2022, 17.73% of the municipality's economically active population was employed in this sector. According to the IBGE, in 2022, the municipality had a livestock population of 5,644 cattle, 1,210 horses, 5,200 pigs, 330 goats, 350 sheep, and 13,000 poultry, including hens, roosters, broiler chickens, and chicks, as well as 1,250 quails. That same year, the seasonal crop yielded 12,600 tons of tomatoes and 576 tons of cassava. and in permanent crops, 434 tons of guavas, 2,141 tons of bananas, and 1,345 tons of persimmons.

=== Secondary and Tertiary Sectors ===
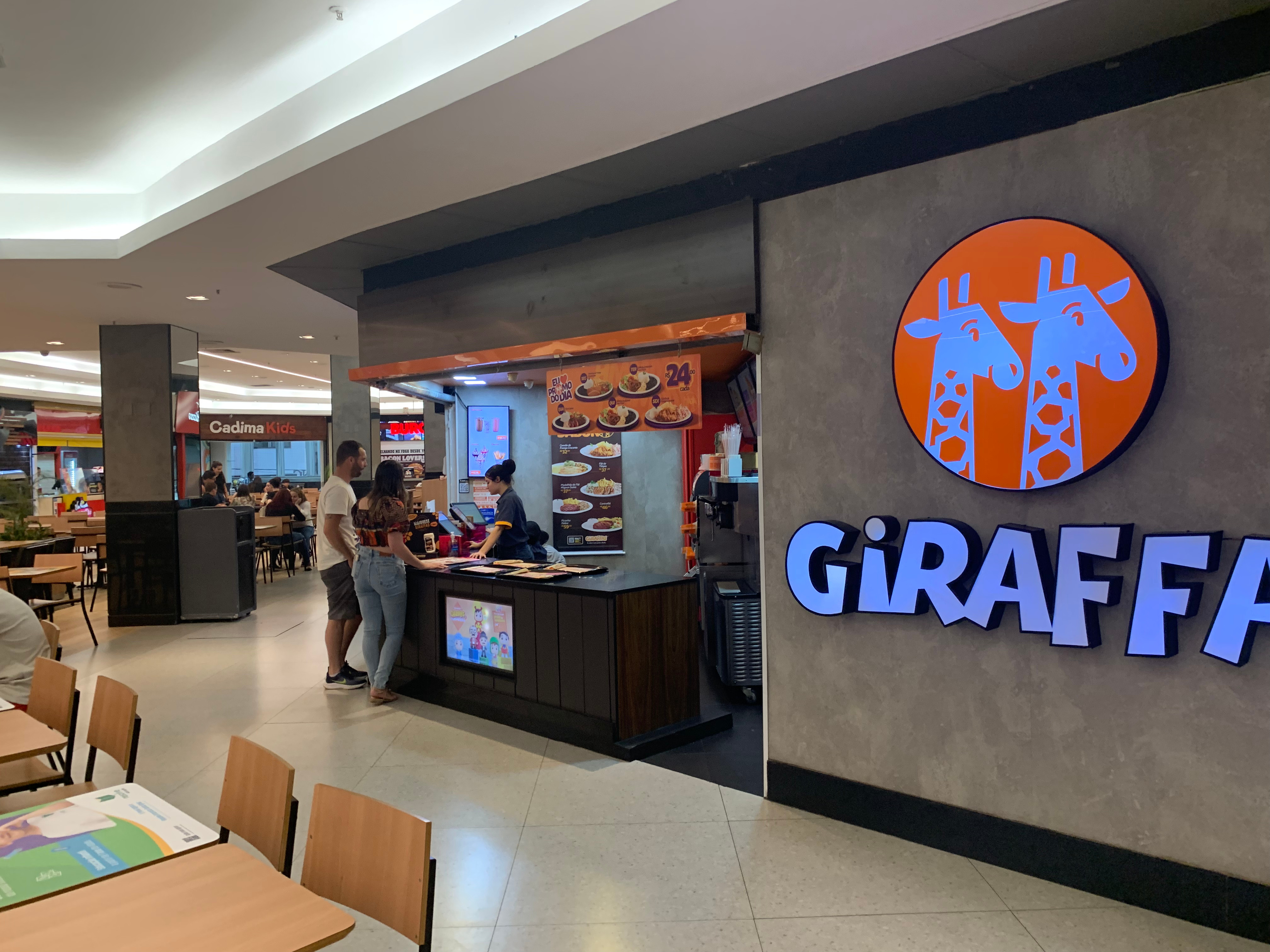
Giraffas in Cadima Shopping

In 2021, manufacturing was the second most important sector for the municipality’s economy. 768,816.71 thousand reais of the municipal GDP came from the gross value added of the secondary sector. The city’s main industries are linked to the food sector, particularly coffee processing companies that handle coffee from the mountainous region’s plantations, especially high-quality coffees known as specialty coffees. Another important sector is the mineral extraction industry, and there are a considerable number of sawmills and ceramics factories, although these industrial sectors were once more prominent in the city. According to statistics from 2010, 27.59% of workers in Nova Friburgo were employed in the manufacturing sector. The tertiary sector is the most important for the municipal economy. In 2010, 6.42% of the employed population worked in the construction sector, 0.61% in public utilities, 16.50% in commerce, and 38.77% in the service sector and in 2021, 5,662,060.65 thousand reais of the municipal GDP came from the gross value added of the tertiary sector.

The largest employer is the Stam Metalúrgica, located in the district of Conselheiro Paulino, which received the Anamaco Award in 2025. The company has more than 1,500 employees.

The city’s main commercial and economic hub is Alberto Braune Avenue, renowned as a hub for shopping, businesses, banks and bustling activity. The avenue is home to the city’s highest concentration of shops.

One of the main shopping centres is Cadima Shopping, located in the city centre; it is one of the busiest in the region and opened in 1998. It is home to major retailers and brands such as Lojas Americanas, Casa e Video, Renner, Burger King, Cacau Show, Giraffas and Subway. Another shopping centre is Friburgo Shopping, located in the same neighbourhood and opened in 1997. It houses major retailers and brands such as McDonald’s, Bob’s and Burger King.

== Government ==
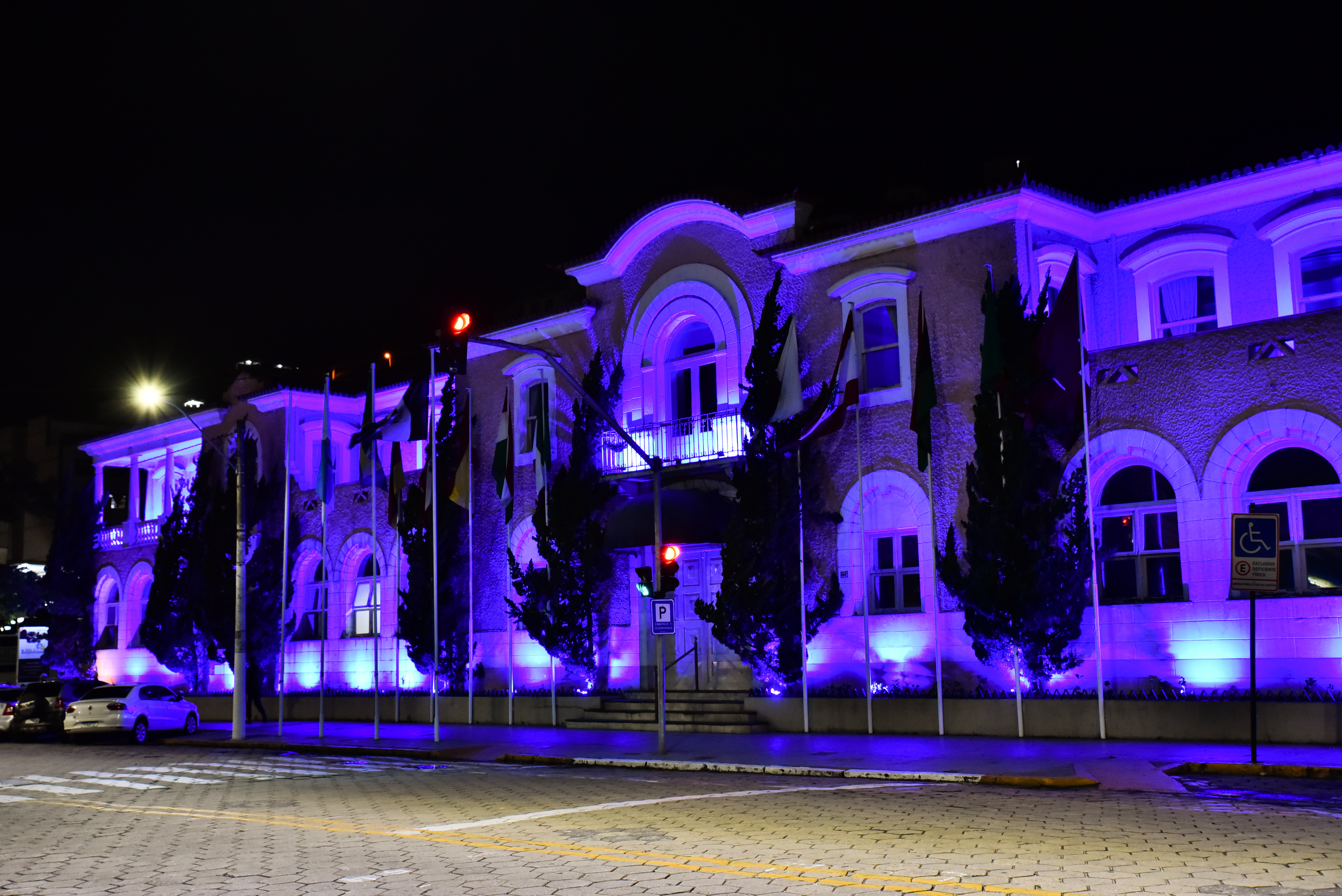
Nova Friburgo City Hall

Municipal administration in Nova Friburgo is carried out by the Executive and Legislative powers. The Executive is led by the mayor, supported by a cabinet of secretaries. The first mayor was Everard Barreto de Andrade. The mayor elected in the 2024 municipal elections was Johnny Maycon, re-elected by Partido Liberal with 64,99% of valid votes for his second consecutive term, alongside Rodrigo Ascoly (MDB) as vice-mayor. The council is responsible for drafting and voting on fundamental laws for administration and the Executive, particularly the participatory budget (Budget guidelines law). As of January 2024, the city had 62 920 voters, according to the Superior Electoral Court (TSE).

=== Sister cities ===
- Santo Tirso, Portugal
- Fribourg, Switzerland

== Arts and culture ==
=== Cultural institutions ===
The municipality's cultural affairs agency operates under the authority of the executive branch. Among the cultural venues, the Nova Friburgo Municipal Public Library, maintained by the municipal government and art galleries stand out, according to the IBGE in 2021.

There are also artistic groups that perform traditional folk art, according to the IBGE in 2012.

=== Events and Points of interest ===
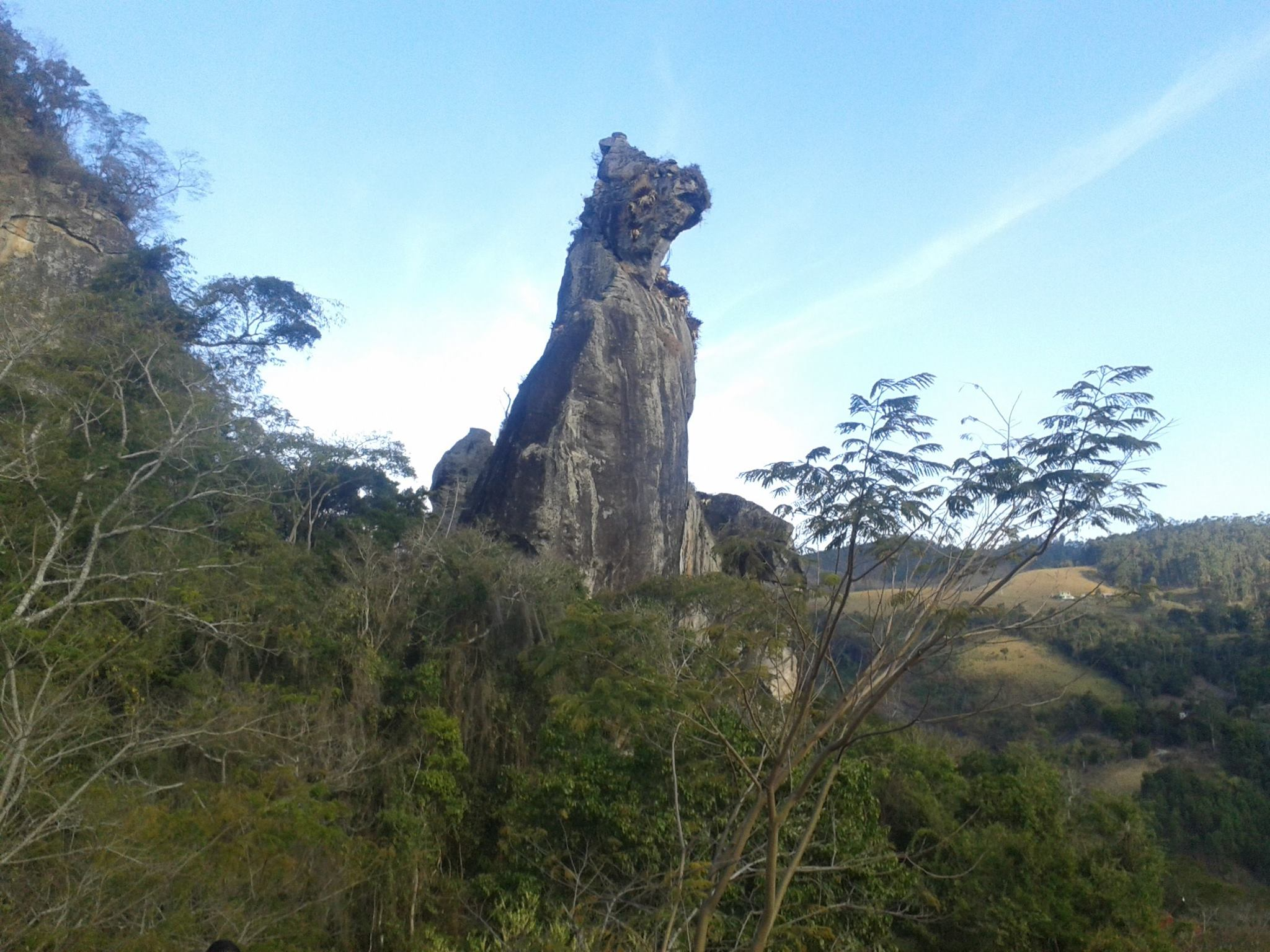
Pedra do Cão Sentado

Among the events on the municipality’s tourism calendar are Carnival, which takes place February 9–13; the Beer Festival, May 10–26; Amor sobe a Serra, June 7–9; the Winter Festival, June 21–30, and New Year’s Eve on December 31.

The city's major tourist attractions are:

- Pedra do Cão Sentado: located along the highway connecting Nova Friburgo to the municipality of Bom Jardim, with a height of 111 meters.
- Demerval Barbosa Moreira Square: Located next to Getúlio Vargas Square, the square is frequently used for cultural events, such as street theater, Carnival, and others.
- Getúlio Vargas Square: It is the city's main square. It has been listed by the National Institute of Historic and Artistic Heritage since 1972.
- Marcilio Dias Square: also known as Paissandu Square, the square is surrounded by beautiful, towering trees. The square is where the city’s dance groups hold their rehearsals.
- Suspiro Square: A charming spot where the cable car is located, the Chapel of St. Anthony, Troubadours Square, the Fountain of Suspiro, the Military Training Program, Laércio Ventura Municipal Theater and Praça das Colônias.
- Nova Friburgo Country Clube : The city’s only country club, founded in April 1957. It covers an area of 194,000 square meters.
- St. John the Baptist Cathedral: It was consecrated in 1869. The cathedral district comprises 19 municipalities and is one of the city's few cathedrals.
- Jardim do Nêgo: Geraldo Simplício, a native of Ceará known as Nêgo, is in charge of the sculpture museum. It covers an area of nearly 30,000 square meters.
- Três Picos State Park: The largest state park in Rio de Janeiro, with entrances on RJ-130 and RJ-116.
- Pico da Caledônia: Pico da Caledônia is the second-highest mountain in the Serra do Mar range, with an elevation of 2,257 meters.
- Juárez Frotté Municipal Park: Located six kilometers from downtown in the Cascatinha neighborhood. It is a very popular tourist attraction in the neighborhood, drawing around a thousand visitors
- Laércio Ventura Municipal Theater: The Municipal Theater hosts plays, concerts, and festivals. It was named in honor of Laercio Rangel Ventura. The theater opened in September 2008.

=== Holidays ===
In Nova Friburgo, there is one municipal holiday and ten national holidays, in addition to the eight optional holidays. The municipal holidays are only the Municipal Holiday and the city's anniversary. The national holidays are: Universal Brotherhood (January 1), Passion of Christ (March 29), Tiradentes Day (April 21), International Workers’ Day (May 1), Brazilian Independence Day (September 7), Our Lady of Aparecida, All Souls’ Day (November 2), Proclamation of the Republic (November 15), National Day of Zumbi and Black Consciousness (November 20), and Christmas (December 25). The optional holidays are: Carnival (February 12–13), Ash Wednesday (February 14), Corpus Christi (May 30), Federal Civil Servants’ Day (October 28), Christmas Eve (December 24), and New Year’s Eve (December 31).

== Education ==
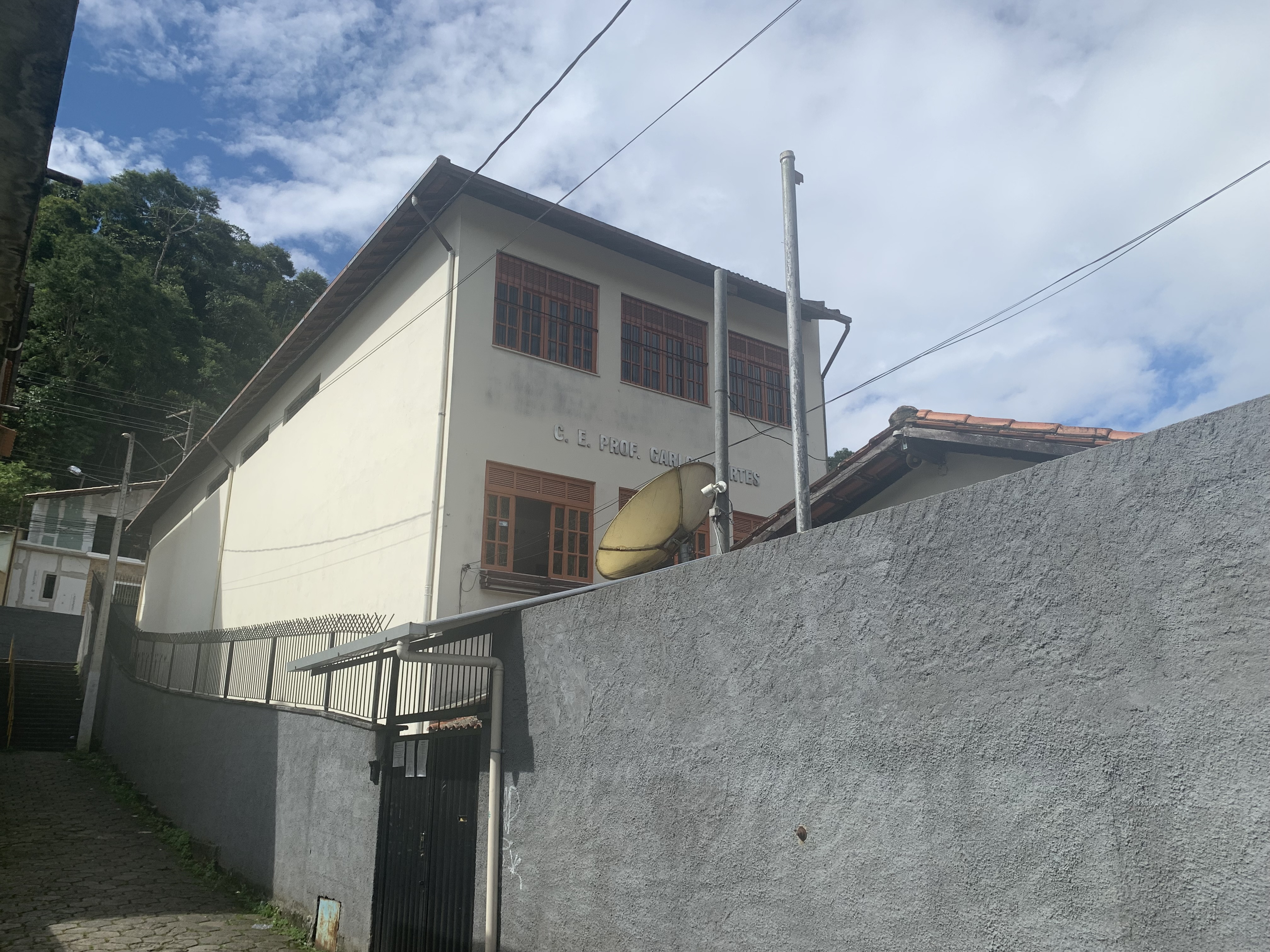
View of the Professor Carlos Cortes State High School in the Catarcione neighborhood

In the area of education, the average Basic Education Development Index (IDEB) among public schools in Nova Friburgo was 5.2 for 5th-grade students in 2021 (the 63rd highest in Rio de Janeiro), on a scale ranging from 1 to 10. Among 9th-grade students, the score was also 5.2 (22nd in the state), and for high school students, it was 5. In 2010, 96.07% of children aged five to six were enrolled in early childhood education, while 82.71% of the population aged 11 to 13 were attending the final grades of elementary school.

However, among the population aged 15 to 17, 54.42% had completed elementary school, while 46.30% of residents aged 18 to 20 had completed high school. Residents had an average expected years of schooling of 9.03, while 5.99% of people aged 25 or older were illiterate. Among this age group, 51.61% had completed elementary school, 34.39% had completed high school, and 11.77% had completed higher education. As early as 2022, the age-grade discrepancy among elementary school students—that is, those older than the recommended age—stood at 17.2% in the early grades and 26% in the later grades, while in high school, the discrepancy reached 27.2%.

In 2010, according to data from the demographic census sample, 48,085 residents of the total population attended daycare centers and/or schools. Of this total, 2,851 attended daycare centers, 4,775 were in preschool, 3,173 in literacy classes, 22,515 in elementary school, 6,116 in high school, 286 in elementary-level youth and adult education, 1,412 in adult and youth education at the high school level, 4,852 in higher education, 589 in postgraduate specialization programs, 103 in master’s programs, and 54 in doctoral programs. 133,997 people were not enrolled in any educational institutions, of whom 12,091 had never attended school and 121,906 had attended at some point. In 2021, there were 34,777 enrollments in early childhood, elementary, and high school institutions in Nova Friburgo.

Education in Nova Friburgo by numbers (2021)
Level	Enrollments	Teachers	Schools (Total)
Early childhood education	6 781	623	130
Primary education	22 005	1 449	135
Secondary education	5 991	676	43

== Media and services ==
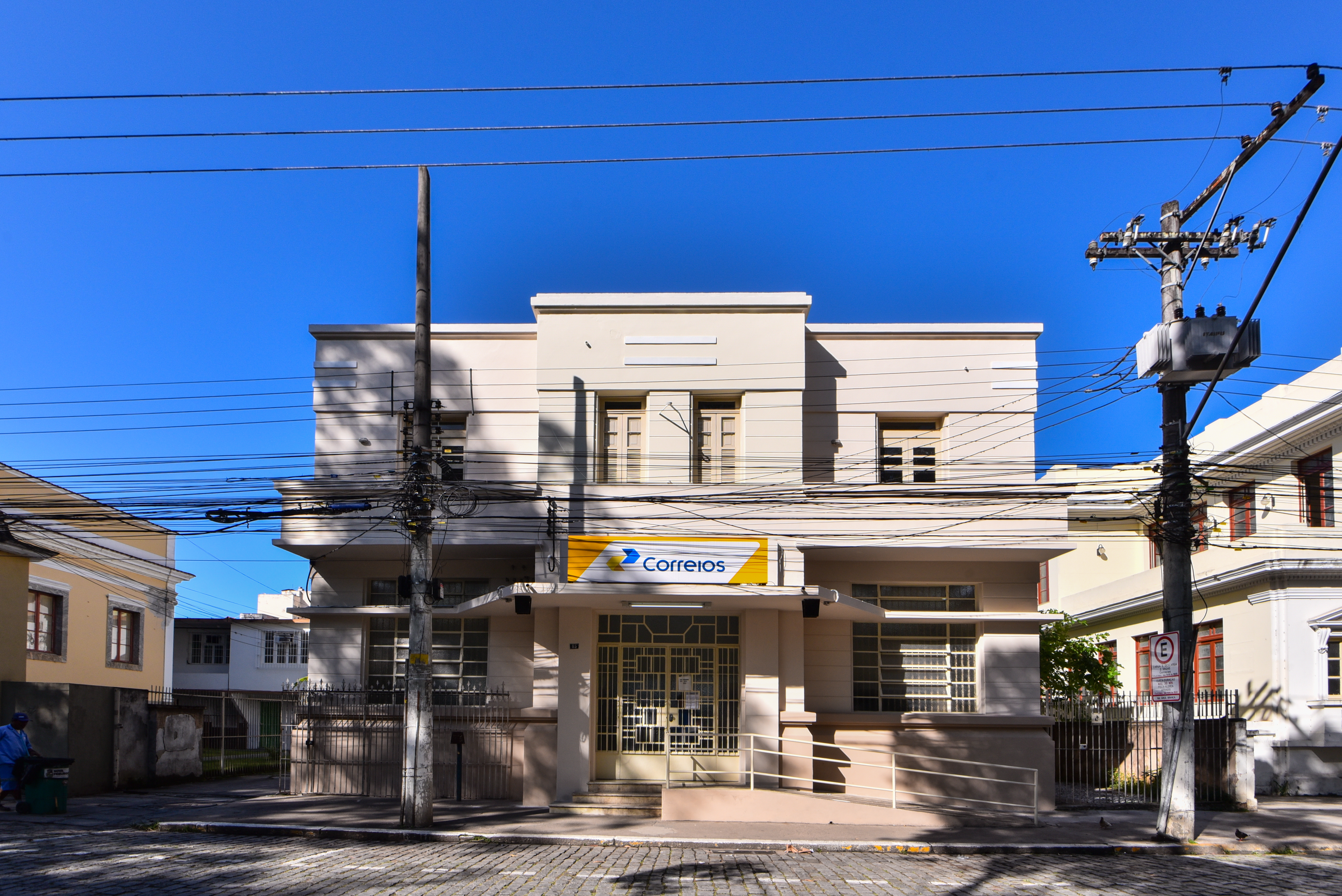
Post offices of Correios, in center of the city

The area code (DDD) for Nova Friburgo is 022 and the city’s postcode (CEP) ranges from 28600-001 to 28636-999. In February 2009, the mountain region adopted number portability, along with other cities sharing the same DDD. The postal service is provided by nine branches of the Brazilian Post and Telegraph Company, located in key neighbourhoods across the municipality.

Signals from several free-to-air television stations are available, including SBT Interior RJ, Band Rio Interior and InterTV Serramar (TV Globo). The A Voz da Serra is Nova Friburgo's local newspaper, founded in April 7, 1945. The Rádio Friburgo is the first radio station of the city, since 1946.

Energisa provides electricity to the municipality. The company serves 11 states and 862 municipalities throughout Brazil. Garbage collection is handled by the city government itself, while the city’s water supply is provided by Águas de Nova Friburgo (Águas do Brasil Group). The company serves 32 municipalities.

== Infrastructure ==
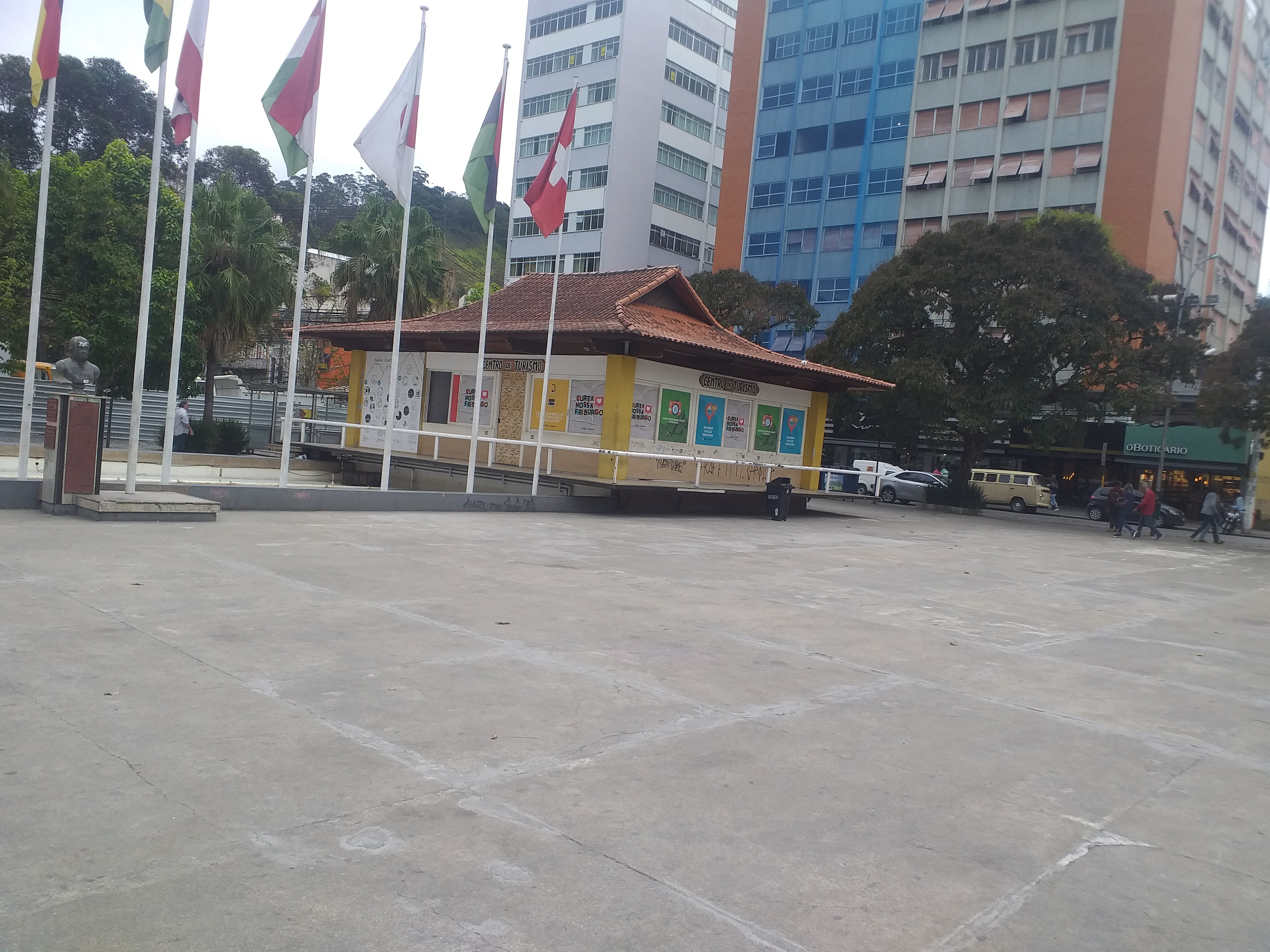
Demerval Barbosa Moreira Square

In 2022, the city had 97,082 permanent private households. Of this total, 57,943 were single-family homes, 3,135 were townhouses or condominiums, and 15,370 were apartments. That year, 78.54% of households were connected to the public water supply system; 99.43% of dwellings had garbage collection (whether through a cleaning service or not); 99.43% of residences had a bathroom for the exclusive use of the household, and 74.54% were connected to the sewer system.

As in most medium- and large-sized Brazilian cities, traffic accidents remain a problem in Nova Friburgo. In 2021, the rate of assaults in the municipality was 8.87 per 100,000 inhabitants. The suicide rate that year was 7.30 per 100,000 inhabitants. As for the rate of deaths from traffic accidents, the figure was 10.5 per 100,000 inhabitants. Nova Friburgo is considered the second safest municipality in the state of Rio de Janeiro.

=== Transports ===
In 2022, Nova Friburgo had a fleet of 133,702 vehicles, including 83,835 cars, 3,632 trucks, 5,638 pickup trucks, 8,670 pickup trucks, 23,476 motorcycles, 2,958 scooters, 1,765 utility vehicles, 340 buses, 366 minibuses, 358 tractor-trailers, and 26 other types of vehicles, with cars being the most commonly used.

Nova Friburgo is connected to four state highways: RJ-116, which begins in Itaboraí and ends in the district of Comendador Venâncio, RJ-142, which ends in Casimiro de Abreu, RJ-150, which connects to São José do Ribeirão, a district of Bom Jardim and RJ-148, which ends Córrego da Prata, in municipality of Carmo.

Nova Friburgo has two bus terminals: the Rodoviário Sul, which opened in 1995 and is located in Ponte da Saudade, and the Terminal Norte, located in Duas Pedras. In the city center stands the old city bus station, now called Estação Livre, which serves the city with both urban and rural routes.

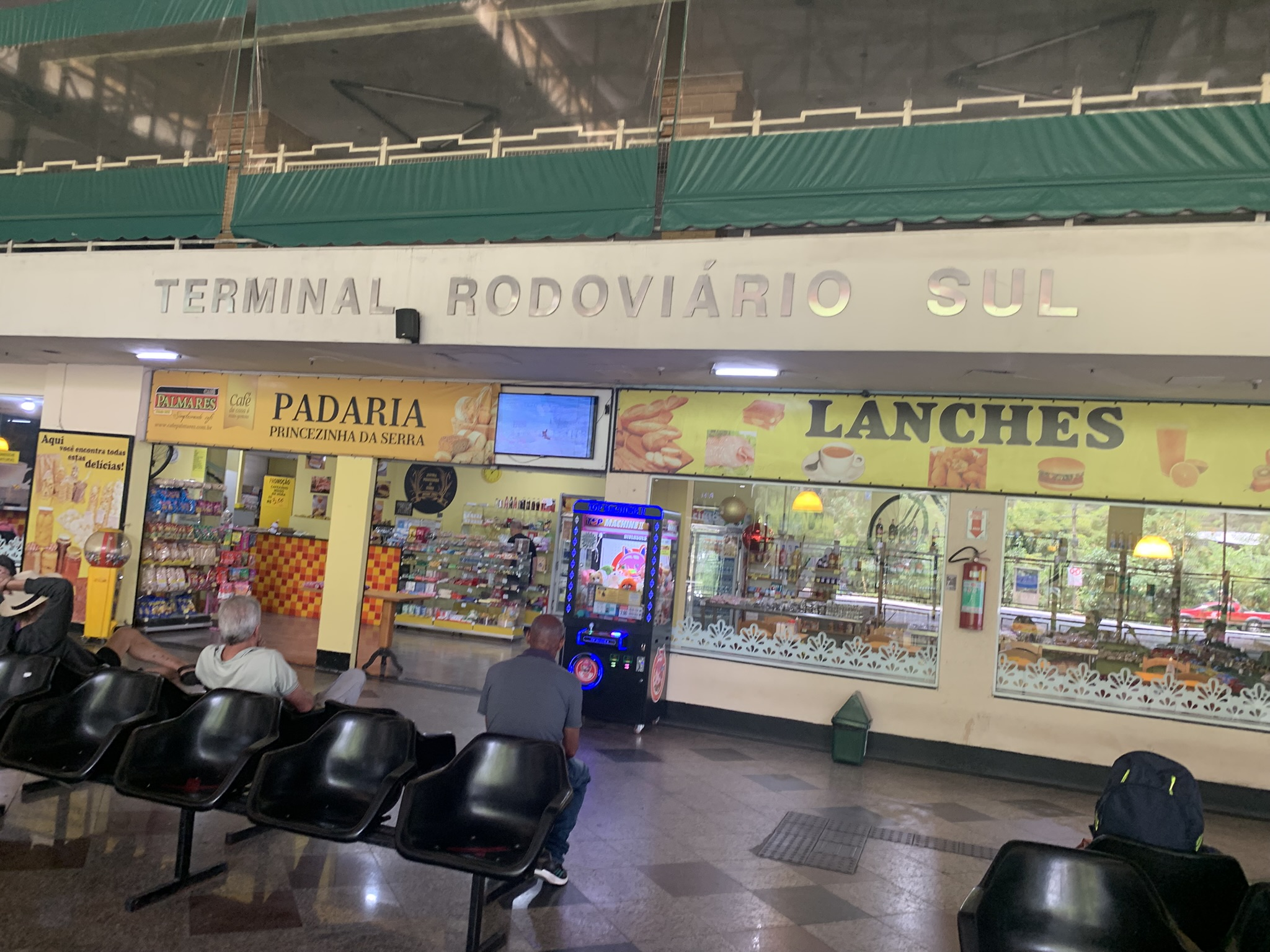
Rodoviário Sul

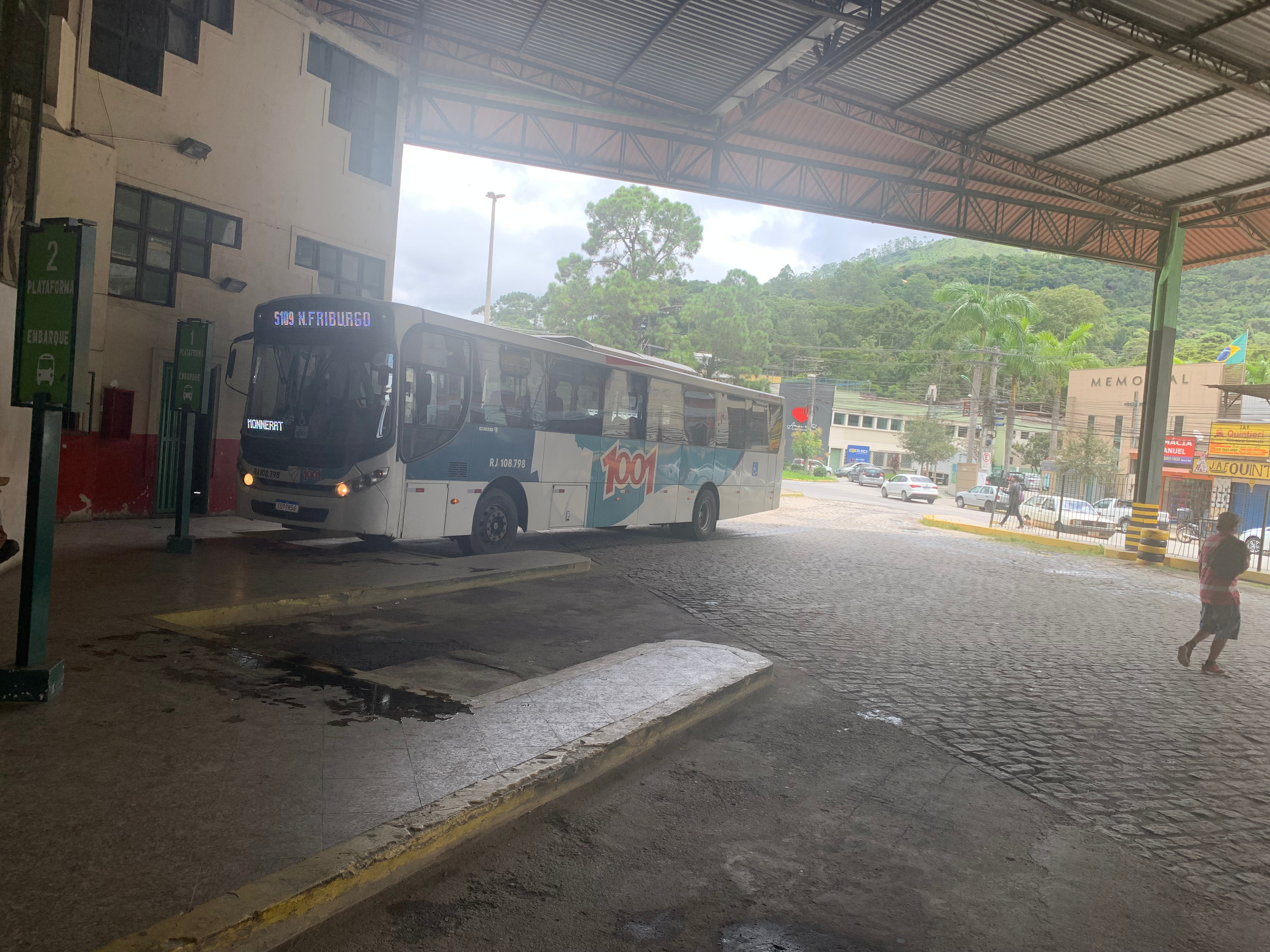
Rodoviário North

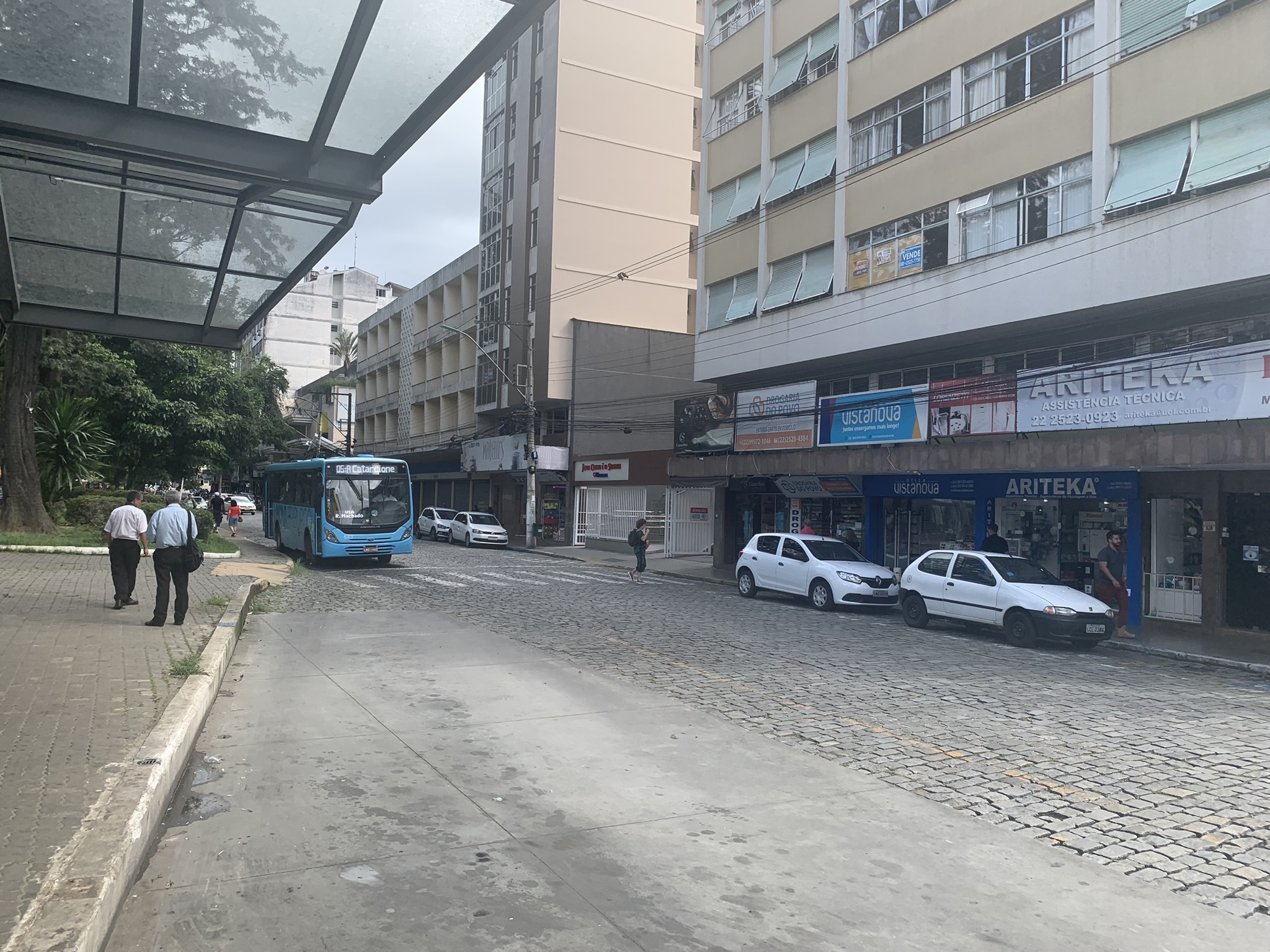
Bus Station of FAOL

=== Health care ===
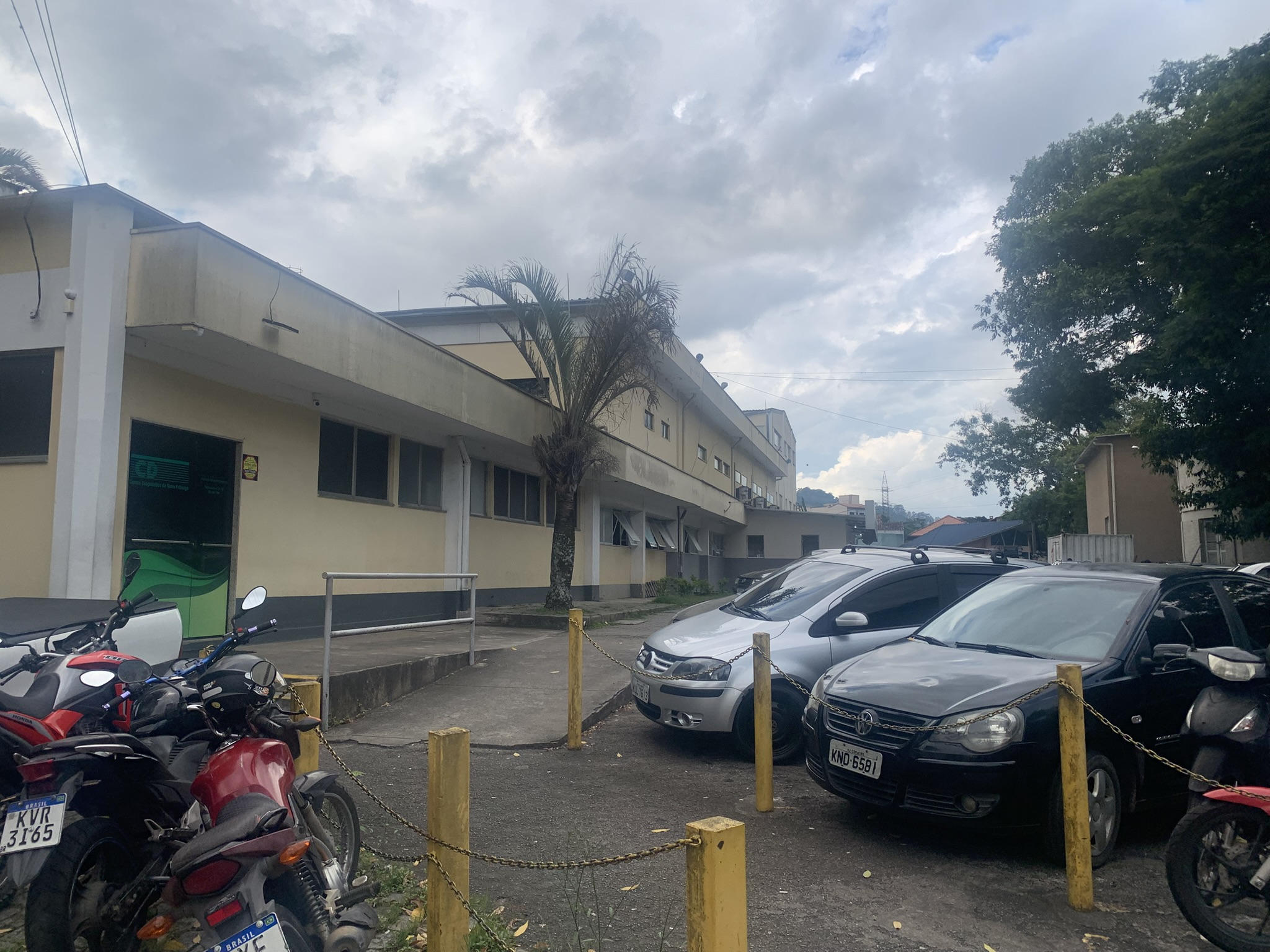
Raul Sertã Hospital

The healthcare network includes 22 primary care clinics, one health center, four general hospitals, two specialized hospitals, and three psychosocial care centers (CAPS).

The municipality is home to several major hospitals. One of them is Raul Sertã Hospital, the city’s main and most important hospital, which is administered by the Nova Friburgo municipal government and serves as a referral center for the interior of Rio de Janeiro. Raul Sertã Hospital was inaugurated on April 28, 1918. Another major hospital is São Lucas Hospital, which opened on April 17, 1966.

== Notable people ==
- Edson Barboza, professional mixed martial artist and former Muay Thai kickboxer
- Saudade Braga, first female mayor of the municipality
- Jhennifer Conceição, swimmer
- Rafael Galhardo, football player
- Marlon Moraes, professional mixed martial artist
- Gustavo Nery, football player
- Benito di Paula, singer-songwriter and pianist
