= Incidents of necrophilia =

Necrophilia is a pathological fascination with dead bodies, which often takes the form of a desire to engage with them in sexual activities, such as intercourse. Though prohibited by the laws of many countries, there have been many reported cases of sexual abuse of dead bodies throughout history.

== History ==
- Incidents of necrophilic abuse are noted to have occurred throughout history. Greek author Herodotus (c. 484–425 BC) stated in his Histories that in Ancient Egypt, bodies of exceptionally beautiful women were not embalmed immediately after their deaths, but only after several days had passed, in order to prevent a recurrence of a case where it was discovered that an embalmer had sex with the body of a recently dead woman.
- According to the Babylonian Talmud (3rd–5th centuries AD), King Herod of Judea (73/74 BC – 4 BC) desired a certain maiden and, after she killed herself to avoid marrying him, preserved her body in honey for seven years. Some say that he embalmed her in order to have intercourse with her; others say that he did not have intercourse with her. Roman-Jewish historian Flavius Josephus (37 – c. 100 AD), whose works are the main source for Herod's life and character, says nothing about any necrophilia on his part.
- Remains of pottery from the Moche civilization represent dead skeletal figures engaged in sexual intercourse with living humans.
- Roger Dymock accused the Lollards of having committed necrophilia.
- Gilles de Rais is noted to have sexually violated the dead bodies of his victims.
- According to criminologist Herschel Prins, it was said that until the 19th century, if a betrothed girl in Central Europe died before her marriage day, the spouse could still carry out the ceremony by copulating with the body.

=== In military conflicts ===
- In the 19th-century Russo-Turkish war, military forces sexually abused dead bodies.
- During the Moroccan War of 1919–1926, necrophilia was committed by the Moroccan troops.
- A Chinese man was killed by the Japanese during the Nanjing Massacre, after he refused to have sex with dead women.
- During the Rwandan genocide, sex with dead bodies was reported.
- Arthur Shawcross, an American serial killer from Rochester, New York, had also practiced necrophilia. Shawcross (also known as the Genesee River Killer) was convicted of 11 murders in November 1990. He claimed to have killed, raped, decapitated, and eaten two Vietcong women during a tour of Vietnam with the 4th Supply and Transport Company of the 4th Infantry Division in 1968, during the Vietnam War. He reportedly also committed necrophilic sexual acts and mutilations on his victims in Rochester between 1988 and 1989. All but one were prostitutes from the area. Shawcross received two separate life sentences in Monroe County, NY and Wayne County, NY respectively.

=== List of necrophiles ===
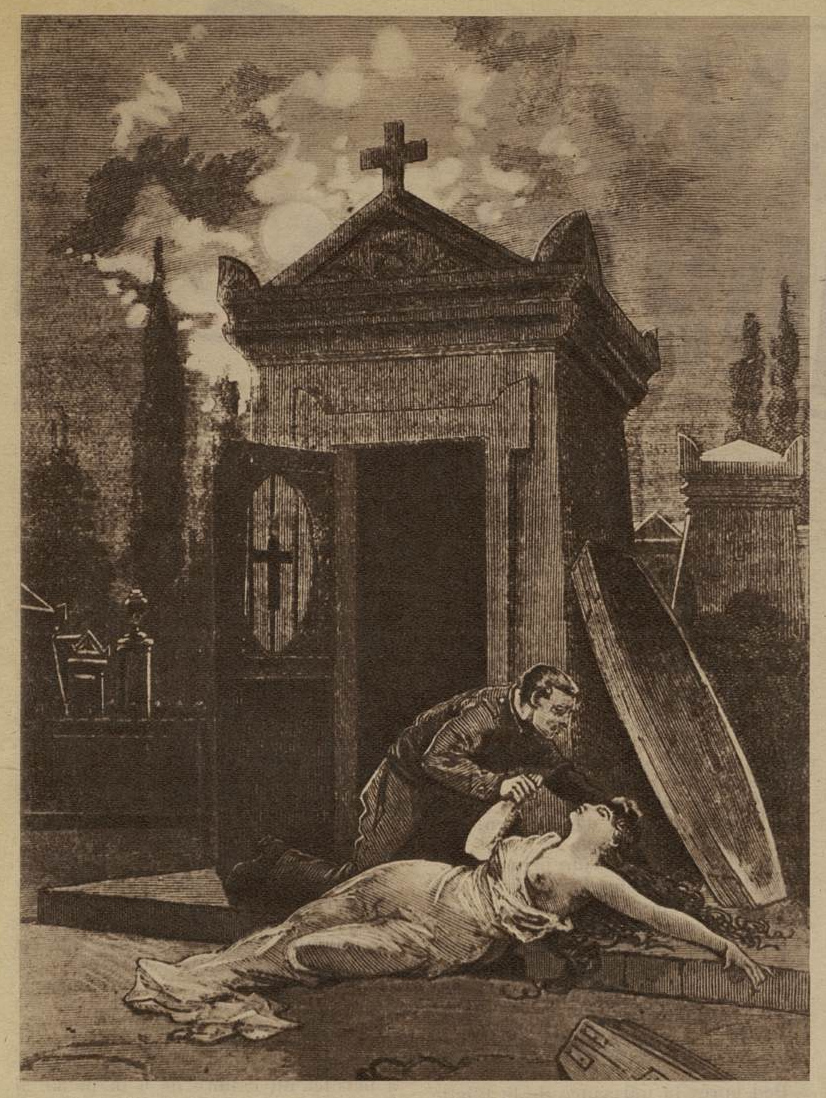
Woodcut of François Bertrand, convicted necrophiliac

- Sir John Pryce – 18th century Welsh baronet who had two deceased wives embalmed, and kept them either side of his bed. Upon the death of his third wife, Pryce invited faith healer Bridget Bostock to resurrect her but was unsuccessful.
- Sergeant François Reece Bertrand (1823–1878) – Nicknamed the "Vampire of Montparnasse", was a sergeant in the French Army. Convicted of necrophilia, he was sentenced to 1 year in jail.
- Victor Ardisson (1872–1944) – Nicknamed the "Vampire of Muy", Ardisson was a French graverobber and necrophiliac, who had sex with over 100 corpses.
- Henri James Blot – Indulged his necrophiliac improprieties on a number of disinterred corpses, including a ballet dancer whom he dug up at Saint-Ouen in 1886, after which he was arrested. During his trial, he said that "Every man to his taste. Mine is for corpses."
- Carl Tanzler (1877–1952) – A German-born radiology technologist at the Marine-Hospital Service in Key West, Florida. He developed an obsession for a young Cuban-American tuberculosis patient, Elena "Helen" Milagro de Hoyos (July 31, 1909 – October 25, 1931), that carried on well after the disease had caused her death. In 1933, almost two years after her death, Tanzler removed Hoyos' body from its tomb, and lived with the corpse at his home for seven years until its discovery by Hoyos' relatives and authorities in 1940.
- Earle Nelson (1897–1928) – American serial killer. Most of Nelson's victims were landladies, whom he would approach on the premise of renting a room. Nelson often studied his worn Bible, using it to keep his victim at ease and off-guard around him. Once he made sure he had gained their trust, he would kill them, usually by strangling them, and engage in necrophilia with their corpse.
- John Christie (1899–1954) – Killed women and sexually abused their dead bodies.
- Yoshio Kodaira (1905–1949) – Japanese serial killer. Aside from his crimes in China, the details of which remain unknown, he is noted to have raped and murdered about 10 women from May 25, 1945, to August 6, 1946, in Tochigi and Tokyo. He often committed necrophilia with the corpses. Found guilty on 5 October 1949, Kodaira was sentenced to death.
- Genzo Kurita (1926–1959) – Japanese serial killer. On August 8, 1951, he raped and murdered a 24-year-old woman, and then had sex with her corpse. Kurita was executed by state on October 14, 1959.
- Jimmy Savile (1926–2011) – Broadmoor staff members claimed that Savile had told them that he engaged in necrophiliac acts with corpses in their mortuary in Leeds; Savile was friends with the chief mortician, who gave him near-unrestricted access.
- Karen Greenlee (b. 1956) – American mortician who was convicted of stealing a hearse and having sex with the corpse it contained.
- Melvin Rees (1933–1995) – American serial killer, sentenced in 1960, for 53 years.
- Henry Lee Lucas (1936–2001) – American serial killer. He had sexual intercourse with the dead bodies of several of his victims, one of whom was his girlfriend, Becky Powell. When asked why he killed women before having sex with them, he answered: "I like peace and quiet."
- Jerry Brudos (1939–2006) – Also known as "The Lust Killer" and "The Shoe Fetish Slayer", Brudos was a serial killer and necrophiliac, arrested in 1969, later sentenced to life term in the Oregon state prison.
- Patrick Kearney (b. 1939) – American serial killer and necrophile. He avoided torturing a living person.
- Vera Renczi (1903–1960) - Romanian serial killer who was charged with poisoning 35 individuals including her two husbands, multiple lovers, and her son with arsenic during the 1920s. Renczi kept the corpses of her victims in zinc-lined coffins, declaring that she sometimes liked to sit in the armchair, surrounded by the coffins of all her former lovers.
- Dennis Nilsen (1945–2018) – British serial killer and necrophiliac. Admitted to having engaged in sexual acts with the corpses of his victims. Convicted in 1983.
- Ted Bundy (1946–1989) – Serial killer, kidnapper, and necrophiliac. Bundy confessed to 30 homicides. However, estimates have run as high as 100 or more (but this is wildly speculative). He was executed in 1989.
- Gary Ridgway (b. 1949) – American serial killer and necrophile. Ridgway is one of the most prolific US serial killers on record based on the number of confirmed murders — ‌49 women—‌most of whom were alleged sex workers and teenage runaways. After raping and strangling his victims, he dumped their bodies in overgrown and forested areas of King County, and would later return to engage in sexual activity with their corpses.
- Edmund Kemper (b. 1948) – American serial killer and necrophile who murdered ten people, and had sex with most of his victims' dead bodies, including his mother's.
- Richard Chase (1950–1980) – American serial killer. He engaged in necrophilia with the body of one of his victims, Evelyn Miroth.
- Piroska Jancsó-Ladányi (1934–1954) - Hungarian serial killer who killed five teenage girls in Törökszentmiklós between 1953 and 1954 in order to satisfy her sexual urges.
- Ondrej Rigo (1955–2022) – Slovak serial killer. He murdered eight women and one child between 1990 and 1992, and had sex with the corpses of most of the women.
- Thor Christiansen (1957–1981) – American serial killer and necrophiliac from California.
- Kazuhisa Yoneda (b. 1959) – Japanese serial killer. He murdered and engaged in necrophilia with two naked girls, Michiyo Okabe (岡部三千代 Okabe Michiyo, 18-year-old Akashi Junior College girl) and Kyoko Kuroda (黒田恭子 Kuroda Kyoko, 20-year-old Kobe Gakuin University girl).
- Jeffrey Dahmer (1960–1994) – American sex offender and serial killer. Many of the charges against him included necrophilia. He was sentenced to 16 life terms, totaling about 937 years in prison.
- Marcelo Costa de Andrade (b. 1967) – Brazilian serial killer, who raped and killed 14 boys.
- Christopher Mhlengwa Zikode (b. 1975) – South African serial killer. In 1997 he was sentenced to 140 years.
- Serhiy Tkach (1952–2018) – A mass murderer in Ukraine who was convicted of raping and suffocating 37 girls between the ages of 8 and 18. He performed additional sex acts on their dead bodies.
- Louise Vermilya (1868–1915) – A female serial killer in Illinois who poisoned two husbands, five children or stepchildren, and four boarders or visitors. She worked, sometimes unpaid, at a funeral home and enjoyed washing her victims' dead bodies before their funeral.
- Reginald Oates (b. 1950) – American spree killer who raped, beat to death, violated the corpse of, decapitated, and cut off the hands and genitals of a 10-year-old boy in a Baltimore park. The next day in the same park, he did the same things to 8-year-old and 5-year-old brothers, and another 10-year-old boy. And the following day, after unsuccessfully attacking two young girls in that park, he was arrested and found with body parts of the boys.
- Bakhtiyor Matyakubov (b. 1973) – Uzbekistani migrant who stabbed to death at least ten women across Russia, Uzbekistan and Ukraine during a four-month killing spree in 2015. He is confirmed to have sexually assaulted some of his victims' bodies post-mortem.
- Andrei Roldugin (b. 1977) – Serial rapist and kidnapper who killed three schoolgirls in Voronezh, Russia from March to August 2002, sexually abusing their bodies post-mortem.
- Ivars Grantiņš (b. 1972) – Cut his daughter's throat and performed anal sex with her body post-mortem in August 2008. Previously killed his common-law wife and another woman.
- Benedito Moreira de Carvalho (1910–1976) – Mentally-ill sex offender who abducted and raped victims he strangled into unconsciousness, but some of them he continued to have sex with even after they were dead.
- David Fuller (b. 1954) – Recorded himself abusing the corpses of over 100 women and girls, some as young as 9 years old, while employed at two different hospitals in Kent. This abuse was unknown until his arrest in 2020 for the 1987 murders of Wendy Knell and Caroline Pierce. Upon searching his home, storage devices containing over 14 million videos and photos of the abuse was found. He was sentenced to life imprisonment without the possibility of parole in 2021.
- Pedro Costa de Oliveira (1896–after 1957) – Sexual sadist who killed a total of three women in Rio Grande do Sul from 1922 to 1952, with his second and third victim being raped post-mortem.
- Andrei Barausov (b. 1961) – Rapist who murdered seven underage girls in Sakha from 1983 to 1997, having sex with the corpses of his last two victims after killing them.
- Ibraim (1976–1995) and Henrique de Oliveira (b. 1974) – Brothers who murdered at least six people during a months-long crime spree in 1995, raping their female victims' corpses. Prior to that, a teenage Ibraim was detained for one murder and suspected of another in 1991, in which the victims were also sexually assaulted post-mortem.
- Taylor Schabusiness (b. 1997) – Woman who killed Shad Thyrion, a 24-year-old man, and performed oral sex on his body in February 2022.
- Doug Clark (1948–2023) – American serial killer who performed sex acts on his victims' corpses.
- Somsak Pornnarai (1962–1999) – Laotian serial rapist who murdered a teenage girl in Thailand in 1995 and had sexual intercourse with her corpse.
- Luka Magnotta (b. 1982) – Canadian murderer who murdered Jun Lin, a Chinese national university student. After fatally stabbing Lin, Magnotta mutilated the corpse, followed it with acts of necrophilia, dismembered it, and mailed Lin's hands and feet to elementary schools and federal political party offices. A video of the incident was recorded and uploaded by Magnotta on the shock site bestgore.com under the name 1 Lunatic, 1 Ice Pick.
- Alexander Lobanov (1979–2002) – Russian serial killer who raped and murdered young women in Perm from 1999 to 2001, often mutilating and disemboweling his victims. After killing his fourth victim, he had sex with her corpse.
- Mikhail Dorogavtsev (b. 1984) – Russian murderer who raped and murdered a female acquaintance and another woman in rural Oryol Oblast between April and May 2012. After killing each, he had sex with their bodies.
- Rory Enrique Conde (b. 1965) – Colombian–American serial killer. Admitted to having sex with one of his victims' bodies after she was dead.
- Issei Sagawa (1949–2022) – Also known as Pang or the Kobe Cannibal, was a Japanese lust murderer, cannibal, and necrophiliac known for the killing of Renée Hartevelt in Paris in 1981.
- Elena Povelyaykina (b. 1997 or 1998) - Russian serial killer who killed and raped two men aged 37 and 31 in the Omsk region. After petty arguments, she beat them to death and later sodomized the corpses with a stick.
- Vitalino Morandini (1916–1960) – Italian thief and serial killer who murdered at least nine people in rural Bergamo and Brescia from 1955 and 1956. In his final murders, the triple killing of the Breno family, he raped the body of the Breno's spouses' daughter, Emilia.
- Evgeny Turochkin (b. 1976) – member of the so-called "Red Light District Orderlies", a gang of serial killers who murdered at least and cannibalized at least seven prostitutes in Almaty, Kazakhstan from 1998 to 1999. Turochkin also had sex with some of the later victims' corpses.
- Mikhail Lukyanov (1949–1997) – dug up bodies of young girls and women from cemeteries across Kyrgyzstan, Kazakhstan and Russia, which he sexually abused. Active from 1967 until his arrest in 1995.
- John Wayne Gacy (1942–1994) – American serial killer who admitted to having committed acts of necrophilia while working at a mortuary in Las Vegas in 1962.
- Karen Walsh (b. 1966) – Northern Irish pharmacist who, in an alcoholic rage, murdered her 81-year-old neighbor, Marie Rankin, with a crucifix on Christmas Day of 2008. Walsh then sexually assaulted Rankin's corpse to make it look like she was killed by an intruder. (Note: The birth year is an estimate, as the article states that she was 45 at the time of her conviction in 2011.)
- Robin Murphy (b. 1962 or 1963) – The only female perpetrator of the Fall River murders who sexually assaulted the corpse of victim Karen Marsden. (Note: Murphy was 17 at the time of her conviction in 1981, so the birth date is an estimate based on this factor.)
- Rudolf Zimmermann (1906–1940) — German serial killer who raped and killed four girls across Nazi Germany and Occupied Czechoslovakia in the summer of 1940. Sexually assaulted the body of his first victim.

== See also ==
- Paraphilias
- List of paraphilias
- Somnophilia
- Death during consensual sex
