= Pedro Palhaço =

Brazilian serial killer, rapist and necrophile

- Born: Pedro Costa de Oliveira; 1896; Camaquã, Rio Grande do Sul, Brazil
- Died: 1967 (aged 70–71); Porto Alegre, Rio Grande do Sul, Brazil
- Other name: "Pedro the Clown"
- Conviction: Murder
- Penalty: 130 years imprisonment

Details
- Victims: 3
- Span of crimes: 1922–1952
- Country: Brazil
- State: Rio Grande do Sul
- Date apprehended: For the final time on April 26, 1952

Pedro Costa de Oliveira (1896–1967), better known as Pedro Palhaço (English: Pedro the Clown), was a Brazilian serial killer and rapist who murdered three women in Rio Grande do Sul from 1922 to 1952. Convicted and sentenced to 130 years imprisonment in total, he was considered one of the longest-serving inmates in the state, but his exact year of death is unknown.

== Early life ==
Pedro Costa de Oliveira was born sometime in 1896 in the city of Camaquã, the only child of a Brazilian, Florencio Ramos, and a Paraguayan mother, Maria José de Araujo. He left his parents' home at an early age to join a travelling circus where he worked as a clown, earning him the nickname "Pedro the Clown". In the early 1920s, he left the circus and found a job as a stoker's assistant for the Rio Grande do Sul State Railroad Company, settling in the city of Montenegro.

== Murders ==
=== Aracy Ferrão ===
On August 28, 1922, Costa went to a local bar with his friend Afonso Pedro Borges, where they joined the company of 16-year-old Aracy Ferrão and Maria da Glória, both teens. When they finished, Costa took a detour back to the city with Ferrão, entering through a small forest near the Railroad Station. On the following day, the girl's body was found nearby—‌she had been strangled, had her body mutilated and a piece of wood inserted into her genitalia.

Costa was immediately considered the prime suspect, as he had noticeable wounds caused by Ferrão's scratches, as well as his clothes having spots of blood which he had attempted to wash off. Two days later, he was arrested and charged with Ferrão's murder.

When the trial concluded on January 19, 1923, Costa was found guilty on all counts and sentenced to 25 years and 6 months imprisonment, which he had to serve at a prison in Porto Alegre.

=== Rosalina Augusta Santana ===
Costa remained incarcerated in the prison until about April 13, 1934, when he was assigned to perform community service outside the prison to help construct the Gravatai-Taqua Highway. Due to this, he was given a small house in Chácara das Bananeiras.

On October 18, 1939, Costa came across 50-year-old Rosalina Augusta Santana, an old acquaintance of his. After talking for some time, they agreed to have sex and went to a vacant lot on Veiga Street in the Partenon neighborhood. Once they got there, Costa told her of his sexual fetishes, but when Santana refused to indulge in his fantasies, he grew angry and attacked her. While she viciously scratched him, Santana was overpowered and ultimately strangled to death. After killing her, Costa had sex with her corpse.

When the body was found, investigators examined remnants of skin found on the victim's fingernails that appeared to match Costa, who had suspicious scratches on his face. Not long after, he was arrested and confessed to the crime. As a result, he was sentenced to an additional 21 years imprisonment and returned to the prison.

=== Psychiatric evaluation and release ===
In 1946, the prison's Anthropological Office ordered that Costa must undergo a psychiatric evaluation to determine what caused him to commit his crimes. After four months of observation, the psychiatrists concluded that he was an "instinctive pervert, sadist and necrophiliac" who posed a high risk to those around him and should not be released under any circumstances. This decision was supported by the Anthropological Office's board.

However, in 1948, Costa requested that he be paroled, citing state law that explicitly stated that prisoners should serve a maximum of 30 years of their sentence. His appeals were processed several times, almost always being denied. When he reached the Federal Superior Court, however, Justice Dionisio Lima da Silva decided to grant his request despite the protests of psychiatrists, and on June 7, 1950, Costa was released.

=== Universina Alves ===
Shortly after his release, Costa moved to the Jardim Floresta neighborhood of Porto Alegre. On the night of Easter Sunday on April 13, 1952, he went drinking in several bars together with 43-year-old Universina Alves Maria de Almeida, a local saleswoman who peddled combs and other small objects. He eventually convinced her to have sex with him, and the pair agreed to go back to his house.

Once they went in, Costa again revealed his sexual fetishes and was promptly denied. Angered by the refusal, he strangled Alves and then had sex with her corpse, before throwing her naked body into a well he had on his property.

== Investigation and arrest ==
On April 26, the property manager went to the house to check on some crops. He was accompanied by his little daughter, who was playing around the well when she noticed that there was something at the bottom of it. Initially, it was believed that the body belonged to Costa, as he had been missing for a few days, but after it was removed, it was determined to belong to a woman. The police soon raided the house, finding dried bloodstains on the floor, bloodstained clothes and sheets, as well as numerous photographs depicting various people engaging in explicit sexual acts. A warrant was issued for Costa's arrest, and he was caught mere hours later.

Initially, the press referred to the victim as 'Sueli', but her real identity was established four days later. It was established that Alves also had a criminal background - the daughter of a Brazilian father and Uruguayan mother and with a twin sister, she ran away from her home at age 13 to be with an older man. In 1924, when she was 24, she killed her second lover, Pedro de Tal, with a hatchet and served a prison sentence before being paroled in 1932. She then settled in Porto Alegre, where she gained notoriety for her alcoholism, due to which her house was called "The Drunken Castle" by locals.

=== Imprisonment and aftermath ===
Due to the overwhelming amount of evidence against him, Costa was convicted and sentenced to 84 years imprisonment. In total, his three murders netted him a total of 130 years imprisonment, making it one of the longest sentences handed down at the time. In addition, he was considered one of the longest-serving inmates in the state of Rio Grande do Sul, having been repeatedly incarcerated since 1922.

In 1957, Costa had his leg amputated due to an infection. He died at age 87 of cachexia in 1967, still serving time in the State Penitentiary.

== See also ==
- Incidents of necrophilia
- List of serial killers in Brazil
