= Rory Enrique Conde =

Colombian-American serial killer on death row in the U.S.

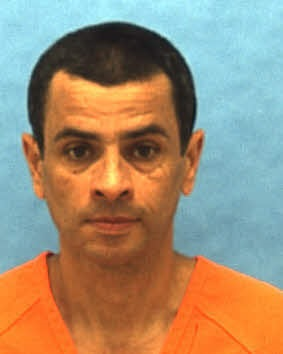
- 2012 mugshot
- Born: June 14, 1965 (age 61); Barranquilla, Atlántico Department, Colombia
- Other name: "The Tamiami Trail Strangler"
- Convictions: First degree murder ×6; Sexual battery Burglary; Robbery; Kidnapping
- Penalty: Dunn: Death; overturned and awaiting resentencing Other murders: Life imprisonment without parole ×5

Details
- Victims: 6
- Span of crimes: September 17, 1994 – January 12, 1995
- Country: United States
- State: Florida
- Date apprehended: June 19, 1995

Rory Enrique Conde (born June 14, 1965), known as The Tamiami Trail Strangler, is a Colombian–American serial killer who killed six prostitutes in Miami, Florida, over a span of five months from September 1994 to January 1995, most of them on the Tamiami Trail.

Conde was sentenced to death for one of the murders, and received multiple life terms for the remaining five. His death sentence was overturned following Hurst v. Florida, and he is currently awaiting resentencing.

== Personal life ==
Conde was born on June 14, 1965, in Barranquilla, Colombia. His mother died of tetanus when he was six months old. Conde and his sister Nelly were then raised by their paternal grandmother, Maria Rojas. When Conde was twelve, they moved to Miami to live with Conde's father, Gustavo Conde, an airline worker who had recently remarried. Rory did not like his father and thought he was emotionally abusive, while Gustavo thought that his son was simply very introverted and a loner. Conde's future wife, Carla Conde, thought that Rory's outbursts were a result of sexual abuse at the hands of his father, but these claims were never corroborated.

Rory and Carla first met in 1985 through mutual friends, and two years later, the pair were married, eventually having two children—a boy, Rory Jr., and a girl, Nidia. By that time, Conde had dropped out of the Miami Dade College and started working at a lumber company, and the family eventually moved in with Carla's parents.

=== Deteriorating marriage ===
While he was mostly known as a friendly and helpful man by most neighbors, Conde was also notorious for his fights with his wife, as they often turned violent. On at least one occasion, he threw her out of their apartment while she was naked and heavily pregnant, but later allowed her to return inside. These abuses became commonplace after they moved into their own apartment in 1989, with Conde kicking, punching, choking, smothering and even threatening his wife with a gun on numerous occasions.

One night in 1991, Carla returned home from work early and accidentally discovered that the family video recorder had a tape in it. When she checked it out of curiosity, she was shocked to see that another woman was wearing her lingerie and later masturbated on the bed. When she confronted Rory about this, he beat Carla up, leading to him later being arrested for domestic battery.

For the next three years, the couple would break up and reconcile on numerous occasions, but Conde eventually stopped having sex with his wife and instead started leaving the house for longer periods of time, ostensibly to go fishing in the Florida Keys. In reality, he was actually going out to peep into young women's bedrooms and masturbating, which he was caught doing in mid-1993, after Carla decided to follow him after he left work.

In early 1994, Conde started working at Booker & Co. as a building supplies salesman, where he was characterized positively by co-workers for being helpful and outgoing. They were unaware of his violent treatment of his wife Carla, or the fact that he often visited prostitutes. Around July of that year, Carla finally left him and took their two children—enraged, Conde threatened to kill her if she dated anybody else. A month later, he attempted to coerce her into coming back, but she categorically refused and announced that she was seeking a divorce.

== Murders ==
On September 17, 1994, police combing the area around Flagami found the body of 27-year-old Lazaro Comesana, a cross-dressing prostitute and former hairdresser known by the monikers "Vanessa" and "Jessica". He was last seen the previous night at the nearby Tradewinds Motel, where a search of his room led to the discovery of drug paraphernelia. Conde would later claim that he killed Comesana after finding out he was a man during sex.

Approximately three weeks later, on October 8, people living near the Florida International University found the body of 44-year-old Elisa "Daphne" Martinez, a drug-addicted prostitute.

On November 20, the body of a third prostitute, 23-year-old Charity Fay Nava, was found on a side road in West Dade. Unlike the previous victims, Conde wrote "THIRD! (A happy face dotting the 'i') I will call Dwight Chan 10. (A reference to WPLG anchor Dwight Lauderdale) [See] if you can catch me. (Using two eyes instead of the word 'See')" on the back and buttocks. The letter was signed with the initials "NYR"—which were later determined to be the initials for Conde's daughter's first name, the Spanish word for "and", and the initial of his first name. The contents of the message were initially withheld from the public, but authorities said that it indicated a link between Nava and the previous victims.

Five days later, the body of 38-year-old Wanda Cook Crawford was found in the parking lot of an apartment complex. Unlike the previous victims, she had been asphyxiated, which caused investigators to initially consider the possibility that her murder was unrelated to the others. By the time her body was discovered, most prostitutes working in the area moved out of fear of being the killer's next victim. This was met with mixed feelings by some residents, as some of them condemned the murders, but were still happy to see that the amount of prostitutes in the area was dwindling.

On December 19, the fully-clothed body of 28-year-old Necole Schneider was found in a residential area near the Tamiami Trail, near a shopping center where police had set up a temporary command post to investigate the recent killings. Schneider was homeless and had multiple arrests for prostitution. Following this murder, investigators officially acknowledged that there was a serial killer active along the Trail, now known under the moniker "The Tamiami Trail Strangler".

On January 12, 1995, police located the body of the final victim, 21-year-old Rhonda Dunn. Just a week prior to her murder, she had been repeatedly warned by police officers not to solicit clients in the Tamiami Trail area. In the press conference announcing her identification, Sgt. Felix Jimenez speculated that this killing was carried out because the Strangler was craving attention from the media, which had recently turned its attention to the escape of five murderers.

After this, Conde started periodically interacting with another prostitute, Cheryl Peterson. Before they left for his apartment in February 1995, she asked him to drive by her friend's house so she can jot down his license plate out of fear of being killed by the serial killer. The pair had sex without any incident, with Conde seemingly growing attached to Peterson, as he offered her $600 to move in with him. When they met for a second time in May, she recalled commenting that he had a nice ring, which prompted Conde to start explaining to her his life circumstances and that he seemed sad when talking about his wife and children.

== Investigation and arrest ==
Over the course of the investigation, investigators from the Miami-Dade Police Department and profilers from the FBI investigated more than 1,000 potential suspects and reviewed a large amount of tips. With more than 100 officers and nearly $2 million spent on the case, it was one of the most expensive investigations in the county for that time, but that still failed to initially produce any meaningful results.

This all changed on June 19, when police received a tip from some residents at Trail Heights Gardens apartment complex that they had seen a naked and bound woman inside the residence of their neighbor, Rory Conde. Officers were dispatched to the scene, where they did indeed locate the victim, a 30-year-old prostitute named Gloria Maestre, still bound and gagged after suffering a rape at the hands of her assailant. At the time of this discovery, Conde was just returning home from a court hearing on an unrelated robbery charge—when he noticed the police presence in the area, he immediately left. He remained on the lam for five more days, until he was finally arrested at his grandmother's house in Hialeah.

Following this harrowing discovery, investigators immediately obtained warrants to search the apartment and Conde's Toyota Celica, obtaining DNA samples that were tested for possible involvement in the murders. The preliminary results linked Conde to five of the six victims, and when questioned about this in subsequent interrogations, Conde voluntarily admitted responsibility and said that his reason for killing the women was because of his wife leaving him. In later interviews, he claimed to have had sex with the body of one of his victims.

The arrest came as a shock to those around him, but it also led to the discovery that neighbors had repeatedly seen him engage in bizarre behavior that was never reported to the police. This ranged from Conde peeping into the bedrooms of young women in the early hours of the morning to him dragging duffel bags with unknown contents to his car in the middle of the night. On at least one occasion while discussing the still-ongoing manhunt with his co-workers, it was alleged that Conde referred to the Strangler as a "smart guy" whom the police would never catch.

== Trial, sentence and imprisonment ==
Following his arrest, Conde was charged with six counts of murder, two counts of rape and one count of theft. Prior to him going to trial, a Spanish-language newspaper named Exito! obtained court records concerning Conde's confession, in which it was revealed that he talked to his victim's corpses and would blame them for ruining his life.

Several attorneys later remarked that they would likely face difficulty defending Conde at trial due to his confession and the amount of strong evidence against him. Two of his attorneys later attempted to have his confession rendered inadmissible in court on the basis that Conde was supposedly insufficiently advised of his right to a lawyer. In response, prosecutors noted that detectives repeatedly treated Conde with cake, allowed him to call his family members and bathroom privileges before he himself decided to admit his guilt.

In October 1999, Conde was put on trial for the murder of Dunn, as it was decided that he should be tried separately for the killings. He would later be found guilty of her murder, and was promptly sentenced to death. In 2001, he pleaded guilty to the remaining five murders as part of a plea deal - in exchange for receiving five life terms without the chance of parole, he was forbidden from attempting to vacate his sentences.

=== Current status ===
Following his conviction, Conde has repeatedly attempted to have his death sentence overturned. In 2003, his appeal was denied by the Supreme Court of Florida.

In 2016, Conde's death sentence was overturned as a result of Hurst v. Florida. As of March 2025, he is still awaiting resentencing.

== See also ==
- List of serial killers in the United States
- Capital punishment in Florida
- List of death row inmates in the United States § Florida
- Incidents of necrophilia
