= Ibraim and Henrique de Oliveira =

Brazilian serial killers and necrophiles

- Born: Ibraim de Oliveira; 1976; Nova Friburgo, Rio de Janeiro, Brazil; December 16, 1995 (aged 19); Nova Friburgo, Rio de Janeiro, Brazil; Cause of death: Gunshot wounds Pedro Henrique de Oliveira; 1974 (age 51–52); Nova Friburgo, Rio de Janeiro, Brazil
- Other name: "The Necrophile Brothers"
- Convictions: Henrique: Murder
- Penalty: Henrique: 34 years imprisonment (Murder); 7 years (Drug possession)

Details
- Victims: Ibraim: 7–8+ Henrique: 6+
- Span of crimes: Ibraim: 1991 – 1995; Henrique: February 15 – November 24, 1995
- Country: Brazil
- State: Rio de Janeiro
- Date apprehended: Killed by police before he could be arrested (Ibraim)/June 17, 1996 (Henrique)
- Imprisoned at: Márica Prison

Ibraim (1976 – December 16, 1995) and Pedro Henrique de Oliveira (born 1974), collectively known as The Necrophile Brothers (Portuguese: Irmãos Necrófilos), were Brazilian brothers and serial killers who killed at least eight people around Nova Friburgo, Rio de Janeiro from 1991 to 1995, having sex with the bodies of their female victims.

The targets of the municipality's most extensive manhunts, Ibraim was killed by BOPE officers while attempting to evade arrest, while Henrique would later be captured, convicted and sentenced to 34 years imprisonment for his role in the crimes.

== Early lives ==
The brothers were two of four children born to farmers Brás and Maria Luiza Soares de Oliveira, who resided in Nova Friburgo. Pedro Henrique (referred to by his middle name), the oldest, was born in 1974, followed by Ibraim in 1976, a third brother named Jaílton born in 1979 and a sister named Márcia, who was born in 1980. Reportedly, none of the siblings ever learned to read or write, and spent most of their childhoods in their rural farm.

Their father was described as a violent alcoholic who would beat his children, sometimes kicking out the boys from the house and telling them to sleep in the woods and fend for themselves. Feeling sorry for them, their mother would throw food out of the window to keep them fed. In later interviews with the press, their mother would claim that Ibraim had raped her while he was still a teenager, and that they had later raped and impregnated their younger sister, who was later forced to have an abortion. Supposedly, they had also dug a grave for young Márcia and intended to bury her alive.

== Murders ==
=== Double murder, Ibraim's internment and release ===
On February 15, 1991, 21-year-old Eliana Macedo Xavier was strangled to death with a wire in the Riograndina sector of Nova Friburgo, followed by the eerily similar murder of 11-year-old Norma Cláudia de Araújo on September 11. When autopsies were conducted on both victims, the coroners noted that the killer sexually abused them post-mortem.

Sometime after De Araújo's murder, the then-16-year-old Ibraim was arrested and confessed to killing the little girl, which he claimed had done by himself. When questioned, he claimed that he killed her after she had supposedly told him that she "didn't like black people", despite De Araújo herself being black. As he was still a juvenile, he was transferred to the Instituto Padre Severino, a juvenile correctional facility on Governador Island, where he was ordered to remain until he reached the age of 18. According to Celso Novaes, a colonel who would later participate in the manhunt for the De Oliveira brothers, Ibraim was mistreated and sexually abused during his stay at the facility, which caused a profoundly negative effect on his personality.

=== Crime spree ===
After reuniting with his oldest brother, Ibraim and Henrique would embark on a killing spree that would shock the Nova Friburgo municipality. For their modus operandi, they would target people living in isolated farms with various weapons, purposefully avoiding harming them from the neck down as to not leave traces, and would always take souvenirs. Due to the fact that all their future victims were black, both contemporary media and the military police would speculate that the crimes were potentially racially motivated, despite the brothers themselves being black. Their first recorded non-fatal attack took place on December 12, 1994, when they attempted to rape a woman named Carmén Augusto dos Santos in São José do Ribeirão, but she managed to escape.

Their first confirmed murder took place on February 27, 1995, when they stoned to death 30-year-old João Carlos Maria da Rocha and attempted to kill his 39-year-old wife Elizete Ferreira de Lima, who survived by throwing herself into a nearby ravine and pretended to be dead. She was eventually found and transported to a nearby hospital, where she claimed that her husband's killers greatly resembled two of the De Oliveira brothers. Upon hearing this, a mob of angered residents stormed the family home, prompting the parents and the younger children to allegedly flee the city and relocate to Itaboraí. On March 7, a 66-year-old farmer named Niltino de Souza filed a complaint to the police alleging that he had been assaulted by two men resembling the brothers.

On April 1, the brothers killed again, this time stabbing to death their 35-year-old aunt, Vera Lúcia Damasceno, at her home in Riograndina. From this point on, they would hide in the nearby woods to avoid getting caught, as their knowledge of the area and the density of the trees prevented authorities from locating and capturing them. In order to survive, they would raid local farms and steal food and clothing, and would sleep in caves or improvised campsites during the night. Whenever they were unable to steal food, they ate animals they captured raw, avoiding cooking out of fear that the smoke from the fire would give away their location.

On May 17, the brothers returned to Riograndina and broke into a local farm inhabited by 56-year-old Odete de Carvalho Silva, whom they killed with a sickle. The body was discovered by her husband, José Lapa, who, in an act of desperation, ran into the forest to hunt for the killers, but was unsuccessful. Upon learning of this new murder, Governor of Rio de Janeiro Marcello Alencar authorized the formation of a BOPE squad to help capture the fugitives. However, as none of the soldiers had been trained to traverse through jungles and due to the vastness of area, they struggled with capturing the two fugitives. As a result, panicked locals resorted to arming themselves with guns and machetes, telling their children not to play outside at night, or even outright leaving the area. Under the leadership of Col. Novaes, the squad started working with local hunters and farm dogs to track the De Oliveiras down. In response to this, Ibraim and Henrique started spreading their victims' blood over their bodies in an attempt to throw off the dogs' scent.

On July 27, the brothers broke into a house in Bom Jardim, whereupon they accosted 67-year-old Íria Moraes Ornelas in the kitchen and hanged her with her own skirt. Due to the escalating situation, BOPE agents were ordered to form two different types of patrols: one consisting of two camouflaged agents stationed in the bushes, and another consisting of four agents dressed in civilian clothing who patrolled the trails. In September, Ibraim alone attempted to invade a farm occupied by 18-year-old Márcia Cristina de Melo, her mother Raquel and sister Andréa. Noticing that an intruder was attempting to get it, Márcia grabbed her father's revolver and shot at the door, scaring Ibraim away.

On November 18, at around noon, the brothers broke into a farmhouse in Janela das Andorinhas, whereupon they killed 39-year-old Maria Dorciléia Faltz with a machete and then beat her 9-year-old Adriano Faltz Gomes to death with a club. At the time of her death, Maria was seven months pregnant, and her genitalia was mutilated by the killers. By this time, a reward of R$5,000 was offered for information leading to the brothers' arrest - the local police department received many tips, including a sizeable amount of prank calls in which the callers claimed that they had seen brothers driving around town (when neither knew how to drive) or that they were supposedly sighted in Goiás, Paraná and even as far away as Paraguay.

The brothers' last confirmed crime took place in the early hours of November 24, when they invaded a farm in Mariana, Sumidouro and burgled it while the owner, 35-year-old Vera Lúcia Matias, was still inside it. They stole food, cut electrical wires and took batteries for flashlights, unwittingly alerting a squad of BOPE troopers that were in the vicinity. In a desperate bid to avoid arrest, the brothers demolished the house, injuring approximately 60 people in the process before escaping.

== Ibraim's death and Henrique's surrender ==
By December 1995, approximately 700 people consisting of BOPE agents, military police officers and civilian volunteers were participating in the manhunt for the De Oliveiras. On December 16, a 46-year-old woodsman named César Araújo Pinto spotted a man resembling Ibraim loitering around the Barro Branco farm in the village of Sítio do Coronel, which he immediately reported to a nearby search party. The officers quickly cornered Ibraim, who attempted to attack them with a machete. In response, the unit's captain, Fernando Príncipe Martins, fired six shots at him, two of which wounded him in the back and buttocks. The wounded Ibraim rushed to the bushes, but eventually succumbed to his injuries. At the time of his death, officers participating in the search supposedly remarked that his entire body had been shaven and that he was wearing only pink underwear.

His body was found two hours later, and to avoid riots, the police secretly transferred his body to Itaboraí, where his body was buried in a potter's field a few days later. Fearing that he would meet a similar fate, Henrique remained on the run for a few more months, living off farm burglaries and food harvested from fields. On June 17, 1996, a weakened Henrique surrendered himself to the chief prosecutor Elizabeth Carneiro de Lima, claiming that he was innocent. He was soon arrested, charged with eight counts of murder and found guilty in 2000, for which he received 34 years imprisonment.

== Current status ==
Despite the lengthy sentence, Henrique de Oliveira was paroled sometime in 2015, but shortly afterwards was detained on drug possession charges and given an additional 7 years imprisonment at the Márica Prison. During his incarceration, he maintained his innocence, with visitors describing him as withdrawn and shy.

In 2019, reporters from A Voz de Serra went to Nova Friburgo and interviewed locals about their experiences and opinions regarding their brothers and their crime spree.

== In the media and culture ==
Two films were produced that were either inspired or based upon the brothers' crimes: the first was the 2014 horror thriller Isolados, and the second was the 2020 thriller Macabro.

== See also ==
- List of incidents of necrophilia
- List of serial killers in Brazil
