= Le Manoir de Paris =

Haunted house in Paris, France

Coordinates: 48.8748°N 2.3537°E

Le Manoir de Paris (French pronunciation: [lə manwaʁ də paʁi], literally The Paris Manor) is a walk-through haunted house. It is one of the former ceramic workshops of Choisy-le-Roi, in the 10th district of Paris, France.

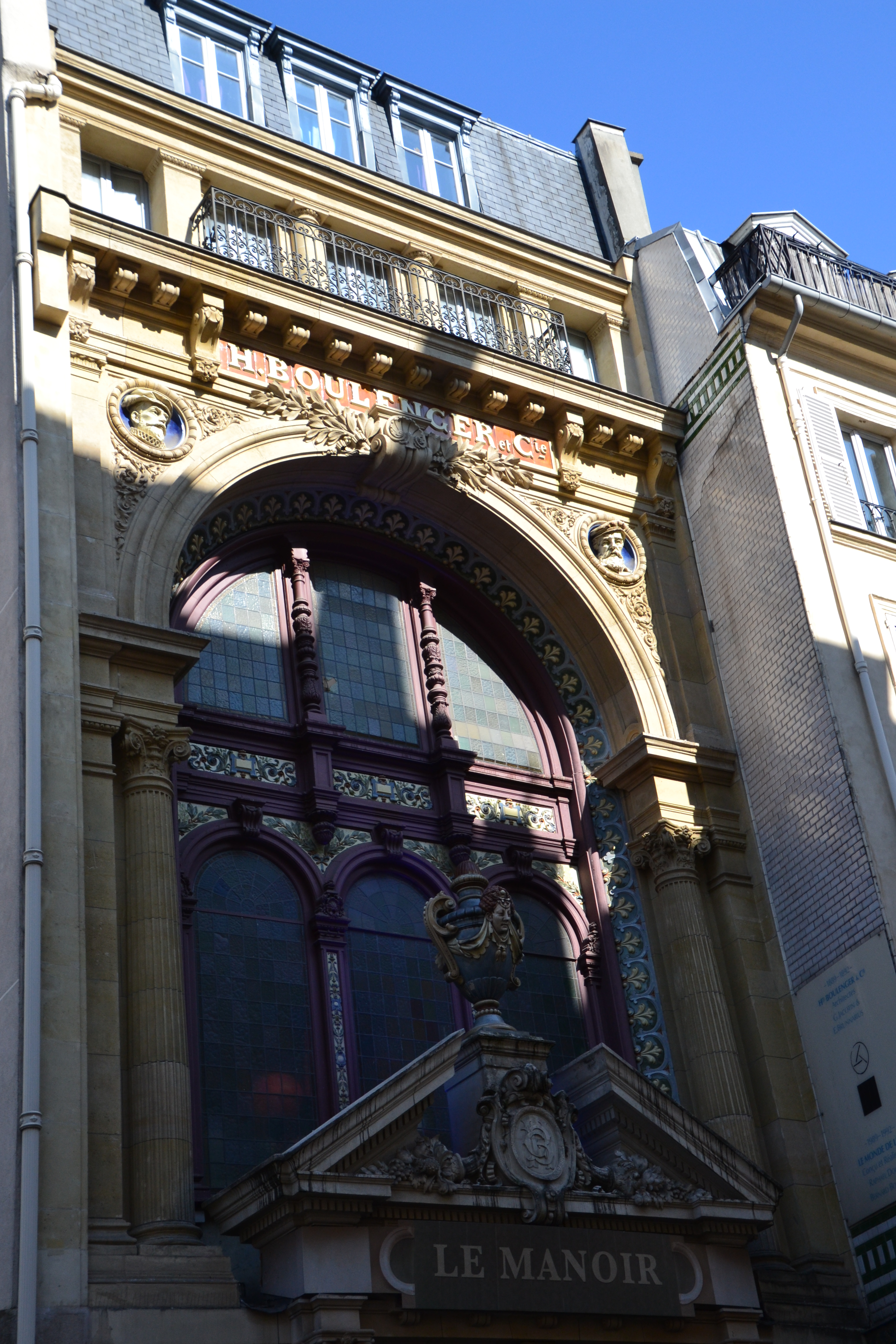
Former headquarter of a ceramic factory now turned "The Manor of Paris"

== Description ==
When it opened, this tourist attraction featured 13 Parisian legends from the 18th to the 20th centuries. Since then, 4 legends have been added, and more are expected to be added. With an area of 1000 m^{2} (10763,9 ft^{2}), it is divided into two floors of 500 m^{2} (5381,96 ft^{2}). These 23 rooms are what makes the journey interactive for visitors. The Manoir de Paris aims to extend itself by an additional 1000 m^{2}, as well. Next to the three animatronic figures imported from the United States, including a gargoyle which adorns the entrance and a rabid dog, there are roughly 20 trained actors in costume who introduce visitors to specific Parisian legends. The haunted mansion also offers five levels of "fearfulness".

== History ==
The site is situated at the edge of the former Saint-Lazare precinct, a leper colony adjacent to what was the Prison Saint-Lazare. Two Cour des miracles were situated near the Porte Saint-Denis, not far from where the Manor now stands. In 1889, the Choisy-le-Roi ceramics workshops, which was part of the firm Hyppolyte Boulenger, built their new store and head office at 18, Rue du Paradis. The building was partially registered as monument historique (historical monument) in 1981; it became the "Musée de l'Affiche" in 1978, and the Musée de la Publicité in 1982, before moving out in 1990. The Manoir de Paris project took 2 years to plan and 6 months to build and rehearse for. Adil Houti, a young American living in Paris, was the instigator for this project. Born in 1983, Houti took part in the creation of two haunted houses in Texas: the first one, "13th Floor St Antonio", is an attraction based on San Antonio, Texas superstitions, while the second, named "House of Torment", is about the Apocalypse in Austin, Texas.

== Legends ==
The Parisian legends told during the visit are inspired by real facts, coming from literature or Parisian folklore: the Catacombs of Paris, the crocodile in the Paris sewers, the Phantom of the Opera, the prisoner in the iron mask, the vampires of Paris, the Paris Métro, the Père Lachaise Cemetery, the phantom of the Tuileries, the Alchemist's Library, the Bloody Baker, the assassins' cabaret, gargoyle and chimera, the hunchback of Notre Dame de Paris. To these were added, some time after the opening: the desecrated grave of Sergeant Bertrand, the witch "La Voisin", the "Barber's Blade" and the guillotine.

Starting from October 18, 2013, a new attraction has been on offer, named "Asylum": in 2013, the Manoir de Paris staged a special Halloween event, between October 18 and November 10. During that period, the usual tour was replaced by one where new monsters and costumed characters greeted the visitors.
