= Mikhail Dorogavtsev =

Russian murderer and suspected serial killer (born 1984)

- Born: Mikhail Mikhailovich Dorogavtsev; 4 May 1984 (age 42); Kalinets, Oryol Oblast, RSFSR
- Other names: "The Livensky Maniac" "The Village Murderer"
- Conviction: Murder x2
- Penalty: 21 years imprisonment

Details
- Victims: 2–3
- Span of crimes: April – May 2012 (possibly 2001)
- Country: Russia
- State: Oryol
- Date apprehended: 7 May 2012

Mikhail Mikhailovich Dorogavtsev (Russian: Михаил Михайлович Дорогавцев; born 4 May 1984), known as The Livensky Maniac (Russian: Ливенский маньяк), is a Russian murderer and self-confessed serial killer who was convicted of murdering two women in Oryol Oblast between April and May 2012. He additionally confessed to another murder he supposedly committed in 2001, but was never tried for it due to a lack of evidence.

For his confirmed crimes, he was sentenced to 21 years in prison on 23 May 2013.

== Early life ==
Mikhail Dorogavtsev was born on 4 May 1984 in the village of Kalinets, Oryol Oblast, the older of two children. His father was an aggressive alcoholic who physically abused and even threatened to kill young Mikhail and his mother, leading to the boy becoming withdrawn and showing signs of a personality disorder at an early age.

Eventually, his mother divorced her husband and remarried, after which she took the children and moved to the neighboring village of Norovka, where Dorogavtsev graduated from high school. Due to his introverted nature, he was unpopular and considered an outcast by his peers, leading to him losing interest in studying and achieving mediocre grades. After completing the ninth grade, Dorogavtsev enrolled at a vocational school in Livny, where he graduated in the early 2000s, but was unable to find employment in his chosen profession.

=== Army stint ===
In 2002, Dorogavtsev was called up for compulsory service in the Russian Ground Forces. At the time, there were ongoing conflicts in Chechnya and the North Caucasus region as part of the Second Chechen War, due to which Dorogavtsev was deployed to Chechnya. He subsequently signed a contract for further military service, and for the next several years served as a military vehicle driver.

He was characterized very positively by his immediate commanders due to his distinguished performance and obedience, but it was also noted that Dorogavtsev struggled with communication skills and was characterized as withdrawn and cold-blooded.

=== Life after demobilization ===
After demobilization, Dorogavtsev returned to Livny, where he soon found employment and worked briefly as a warden at a penal colony. Not long after, the prison authorities discovered that he was abusing the inmates in his designated cell block by subjecting them to cruel treatments, leading to his dismissal. Dorogavtsev struggled with finding another job for a long time after this.

In the late 2000s, he married a foreign woman and had a child with her. Soon, the family moved to Kostroma, Kostroma Oblast, where Dorogavtsev found a job as a fitter for the "Topaz" jewelry factory. Despite the move, he often returned to the Oryol Oblast to visit relatives, often staying for several days or even weeks at a time. While he was generally well-liked, but according to his sister, he intentionally avoided drinking alcohol as he would become very belligerent, similarly to his father. In his free time, Dorogavtsev spent time by himself reading books, mostly about Norse mythology.

== Murders ==
=== Suspected murder ===
According to Dorogavtsev himself, he committed his first murder at age 17 in late December 2001, shortly after he had returned to Livny to celebrate New Year's Eve with friends. After drinking alcohol together, he parted ways with them and started wandering around the city. He eventually arrived at a bus stop and approached a middle-aged woman to propose her for sex. After she refused, Dorogavtsev alleged that he grabbed a nearby rock and hit her on the head as hard as he could, killing her on the spot.

Realizing that she was dead, he dragged the body to an unfinished garage nearby, where he had sex with it and then left. The woman's body was found on the following day. Initially, her husband was suspected of the murder, but he was later proven to be uninvolved and all charges against him were dropped.

Although officially unsolved, investigators allege that Dorogavtsev is the most likely perpetrator, as his semen and DNA was found on the body. However, due to the fact that he later retracted his confession and alleged that he was coerced into confessing by operatives, it was never brought to trial.

=== Confirmed murders ===
==== Tatiana Bakurova ====
On the evening of 26 April 2012, Dorogavtsev was visiting relatives in the Livensky District and driving his Audi 80 around the neighborhood. While doing so, he came across 37-year-old Tatiana Bakurova, a resident of Norovka, to whom he offered to have a couple of drinks. Bakurova agreed, and for the next several hours, the pair drank alcohol together. At some point, Dorogavtsev offered to have sex with her, knowing her reputation for being promiscuous. However, Bakurova refused—this angered Dorogavtsev, who grabbed a hammer he kept between the front seats and then hit her on the head with it. He then dragged Bakurova out of the car, threw her to the ground and hit her at least five more times, causing her to fall unconscious.

Dorogavtsev then took a knife from the car, dragged the woman's body to a secluded area and then proceeded to stab her multiple times in the abdomen, chest, and neck, killing her on the spot. Despite the immense amount of blood and stab wounds, Dorogavtsev proceeded to have sex with the body, and then buried it in a shallow grave near Kshen River.

==== Oksana Chechetkina ====
On 5 May, Dorogavtsev was driving around the Livensky District when he came across 35-year-old Oksana Chechetkina, a post office employee who was out delivering pensions and welfare, near an unpaved road in Kazanskoye. After slowing down his car, he offered to give her a ride, to which Chechetkina agreed and sat in the front seat. This time, Dorogavtsev asked her outright to have sex with him, but was refused yet again. He then took out the same knife with which he had killed Bakurova and started stabbing his passenger, before kicking her out of the car and continuing to stab her once he exited. In total, 56 stab wounds were found on the body during an autopsy, with medical examiners concluding that the killer intentionally inflicted deep wounds.

Following the murder, Dorogavtsev had sex with the body and even drank her blood. He then dumped Chechetkina's body close to where he had buried Bakurova. Before leaving, he stole her bag containing the pensions, a pair of gold earrings and her wedding ring.

== Arrest, investigation and confessions ==
After Chechetkina did not return home and it became known that nobody had seen her since two o'clock in the afternoon, her husband Sergey turned to the police. During an inspection of the area, officers found puddles of blood along the road, leading them to initially believe that Chechetkina might have been killed in an automobile accident and that the driver hid the body out of fear of being imprisoned. At the same time, Dorogavtsev participated in the search party looking for the woman.

While interviewing locals, a witness appeared who stated that on 5 May, he almost got into a high-speed collision with a blue-colored car. While he did not remember the license plate, he remembered the regional number - 44, which belonged to Kostroma Oblast. The investigators looked into all vehicles with this corresponding number, eventually locating a blue Audi 80 belonging to 28-year-old Mikhail Dorogavtsev, who was visiting relatives at the time. Remembering that he had taken an active role in the searches, officers quickly tracked him down and brought him back to the police station for further interrogation.

Initially, Dorogavtsev claimed that he accidentally hit Chechetkina and hid her body out of fear that he would be arrested, claiming that he had thrown it into the Kshen River. However, when a team of divers failed to locate the body, he confessed that he had murdered the woman and agreed to show where he had buried the body. On 26 April, another shallow grave was located nearby containing the decomposing remains of Bakurova.

Subsequently, Dorogavtsev confessed to both murders and described in great detail how he killed them. His house was also searched, leading to the discovery of jewelry belonging to Chechetkina which was found in an asbestos pipe in the outhouse and blood splotches on the interior of Dorogavtsev's car. During the investigations, he pretended to be mentally ill, often repeating that he had killed the women on the orders of Odin and his wife Freya, whose voices commanded him to kill women for supposed insolence against men. Initially, this ruse was believe, as a notebook containing runic symbols dating back to his childhood were found in the house. However, this was conclusively disproven in October 2012, when Dorogavtsev underwent a psychiatric evaluation in Kursk, where he was found be sane.

== Trial and imprisonment ==
After being ruled sane to stand trial, Dorogavtsev was charged with two counts of murder, two counts of abuse of corpses and two counts of theft. His case was brought to the court in January 2013.

On 23 May 2013, the Oryol Regional Court found Dorogavtsev guilty on all counts and sentenced him to 21 years imprisonment, with an additional security period of a year and a half to be imposed after his release. He soon filed an appeal to the Supreme Court, but it was rejected on 7 August, finalizing his sentence.

== See also ==
- Incidents of necrophilia

== In the media and culture ==
- The case was covered on the episode "Village Murderer" (Russian: Деревенский душегуб) from the series "On the trail of a Monster"
