= Bakhtiyor Matyakubov =

Uzbekistani serial killer (born 1973)

- Born: Baxtiyor Atajanovich Matyakubov; April 9, 1973 (age 53); Uzbek SSR
- Other names: "The Uzbek Chikatilo" "The Maniac in the White Gloves"
- Convictions: Murder x11 Rape
- Penalty: Ukraine: Life imprisonment Russia: Life imprisonment

Details
- Victims: 10+
- Span of crimes: January – April 2015
- Country: Russia, Uzbekistan, Ukraine
- States: Moscow, Tashkent, Samarqand, Kyiv City
- Date apprehended: April 2015

Bakhtiyor Atazhanovich Matyakubov (Russian: Бахтиёр Атажанович Матякубов; Ukrainian: Бахтіор Атажанович Матякубов; Uzbek: Baxtiyor Atajanovich Matyakubov; born April 9, 1973), known as The Uzbek Chikatilo (Russian: Узбекский Чикатило; Ukrainian: Узбецький Чикатило), is an Uzbekistani serial killer and rapist who killed at least ten women across Russia, Uzbekistan and Ukraine during a four-month killing spree. Convicted for his respective crimes in Ukraine and Russia, he has been sentenced to life imprisonment in both countries.

== Early life ==
Bakhtiyor Atazhanovich Matyakubov was born on April 9, 1973, in the Uzbek SSR. According to his family and relatives, he was a very aggressive child who frequently beat up his parents and siblings, and often had fights in school. During these assaults, he reportedly always donned a pair of white gloves, with which he seemed to have a peculiar fascination with.

He was first arrested for robbery and rape at age 17, for which he served a short prison term. For the next few decades, he would be repeatedly imprisoned for similar offences until his eventual release in 2006, whereupon he moved to Moscow, Russia, to find a job. Matyakubov would soon be arrested for robbery in Khimki and sentenced to 15 years' imprisonment, of which he served only 12 and was released for good behavior in 2014. According to his own claims, he moved in with a fellow countrywoman in November of that year but had a falling out when he learned that she was corresponding with another man. Matyakubov later claimed that he felt as if "the earth is leaving under [his] feet" and stalked his roommate to the Kursky railway station, where he planned to kill both her and her companion. He stopped himself from doing so due to the amount of potential witnesses and his desire not to be arrested.

== Murders ==
By New Year's Day, Matyakubov had moved into his brother's rental apartment. To celebrate the occasion, he borrowed his brother's Hyundai and began cruising around Moscow. When he reached the Lyublino Metro Station, he noticed 36-year-old Yulia Anpilova, the manager of a real estate company who seemingly wanted to hitchhike home. He offered to pick her up and she accepted, willingly going into his car. Along the way, Matyakubov asked her if she was married and had children, to which she replied that she was and had two – this was a lie, as Anpilova had never married nor had children. Her response angered Matyakubov, who considered it improper for married women to get into the cars of random strangers, causing him to drive out of town, find an isolated area and forcefully drag her out of the car. Upon doing so, he viciously stabbed Anpilova several times with a Sherkhan-brand knife, killing her. He then covered the body with a sheepskin coat and hid it in a nearby ditch, with the body remaining undiscovered until his arrest. In his later testimony, Matyakubov would claim that he felt "relieved" that there was "one less prostitute in Moscow."

That same night, he travelled to the nearest airport and booked a flight to Tashkent, Uzbekistan. On the following day, he went into a pharmacy and attacked the female clerk, raping and strangling her to death. Six days later, he went into a sewing shop, where he raped and killed a store employee – on that same day, he travelled to Samarkand and did the same thing to another woman. Reportedly, he even beheaded one of them.

Matyakubov is not known to have committed any murders in February, and by March 3, he had gotten on a bus bound for Kyiv, Ukraine. On the following day, he was walking along a forested area near the Teremky Metro Station when he came across 47-year-old Natalya Onipchenko, who was walking her dog. After following Onipchenko to an isolated area, he asked her if her dog could bite, and when she replied in the negative, Matyakubov pulled out his knife and stabbed her twice in the chest. After killing Onipchenko, he dragged the body to the nearby bushes and sexually assaulted it. He then tore off her earrings and stole her mobile phone before fleeing. For reasons unknown, Matyakubov did not sell the phone and instead started using it for himself. Just two days later, he was walking around in a park when he came across 77-year-old Klavdia Lepetyukha, whom he confronted and stabbed approximately 20 times. Like the previous victim, Matyakubov sexually assaulted her body, and later stole her earrings and mobile phone.

On March 14, Matyakubov was near the Polytechnic Institute Metro Station when he took notice of a 52-year-old saleswoman working at a flower stall. He waited until there were no possible witnesses, went inside and lunged at the woman, stabbing her multiple times. The wounded victim cried out for help and begged for mercy, which seemingly scared him off, as instead of finishing her off, Matyakubov stole some gold jewellery from her purse and left. By that time, authorities had been alerted that a murderer was stalking the city and started distributing facial composites of the alleged suspect. Fearing imminent arrest, Matyakubov left Kyiv and returned to Moscow.

On March 17, he was strolling around Izmaylovsky Park when he noticed 44-year-old Elmira Gusenko walking her dog. He noticed that she had a ring on her finger, which made him consider targeting her because he thought she was 'flaunting' herself. Matyakubov then caught up with Gusenko and attempted to kill her with a single stab, but as she was still alive, he continued to stab her until she succumbed to her injuries. Gusenko's body was found mere minutes later by passers-by, but by that time, Matyakubov had managed to escape.

On April 4, Matyakubov staked out a confectionery shop on Leskov Street, where 35-year-old Natalya Elkina was working. After making sure that there were no customers inside, he went in and stabbed her 29 times, splattering blood all over the counter and nearby walls. He then stole 3,000 rubles and fled in a car. Matyakubov later claimed that he had killed Elkina because she was blonde and had blue eyes, and since he considered all women with these characteristics whores, he had to kill her.

On the next day, feeling the urge to kill another woman, Matyakubov drove his car to Balashikha and sought another victim. He approached a local medical supplies store and asked the 53-year-old saleswoman, Irina Chekanova, if they had any white coats. She replied that they did not, and allegedly looked at him in a negative way. Matyakubov pulled out his knife and stabbed her seven times. He did not take anything from the store this time, and simply left.

His final attack occurred four days later. In order to celebrate his birthday, Matyakubov decided that he would go to the "Jaga-jaga" sex shop in Moscow, where 26-year-old Yulia Lebezhina worked. As he considered it "immoral" for decent women to work at such places, he went in, stabbed her to death, stole 8,810 rubles and left. Matyakubov would later claim that he regretted killing Lebezhina as he found her pretty, and also said that he dreamed of her several times.

== Arrest, trial and imprisonment ==
On April 11, sensing that the Russian police were on his trail, Matyakubov fled back to Kyiv, where he found work at a construction site and resided in a hostel. During his stay, he met a Ukrainian woman who invited him to stay over at her place and go out on a date. While he initially had plans to kill her, Matyakubov was persuaded to not do it after going to her apartment, where he was greeted by her two children.

On April 15, Matyakubov was arrested by police officers, who found him drinking beer at a local café. He did not resist his arrest, and told the arresting officers that if they had not stopped him, he likely would have continued killing and could even have surpassed Anatoly Onoprienko. When brought in for interrogation, Matyakubov made an offer to Dmitry Tkachuk, an employee working for the Public Prosecutor's Office – as long as he did not ask for a life sentence at trial, he was willing to confess to anything he wanted. After agreeing to his request, Matyakubov calmly retold every single detail of his crimes in Kyiv to Tkachuk, who noted everything down. At the trial, however, Tkachuk unexpectedly asked that the convict be sentenced to life, going against their initial deal. Upon hearing this, an enraged Matyakubov attempted to break out of his detention cell using a hidden shiv, all the while shouting obscenities and threatening to kill Tkachuk. Just as he was about to break the holding cage, his interpreter managed to calm him down. He was later reprimanded for his outburst and for smuggling an illegal weapon to court.

At the subsequent psychiatric evaluation, Matyakubov attempted to present himself as mentally ill by claiming that God had told him to kill women. This tactic did not deceive the psychiatrists, who found that he was fully sane while committing the crimes but diagnosed him as a sexual sadist with necrophiliac tendencies. Matyakubov later claimed that his reason for targeting predominantly older women was because of his mother's supposed physical abuse when he was younger, but these claims were contradicted by family members and relatives. He was convicted on all counts for his crimes in Ukraine and subsequently sentenced to life imprisonment.

Almost immediately following his conviction, Matyakubov was extradited to Russia, where he was due to stand trial for the murders committed there. He was ordered to undergo another psychiatric evaluation, which again concluded that he was sane at the time of the crimes. The results of this evaluation also ascertained that he was of lesser intelligence; emotionally unstable and incapable of understanding other people's emotions; extremely demanding of others and showed signs of dementia and egocentrism.

While awaiting trial, Matyakubov's court-appointed lawyer, Marina Efimenko, stated that her client acted surprisingly nicely and even sent her postcards, but she would later claim that this was intentional to make him appear less dangerous. He would later be found guilty on all counts and sentenced to a second life term for the five murders committed in Russia. In the aftermath of his conviction, Matyakubov said that he had no intent of appealing the verdict, but also said that he felt no remorse for what he had done and would likely kill again if released. While serving his term at a special regime colony, he converted to Christianity and renounced his murders, but this was widely believed to just be a ploy made to bring pity on him.

As of May 2022, Matyakubov remains in a Russian prison and faces extradition to his native Uzbekistan, where he faces a third life sentence if convicted of the killings there. Some news sources have claimed that he is possibly responsible for others, perhaps dozens of killings committed across the three countries, but no new charges have been brought against him thus far.

== See also ==
- List of incidents of necrophilia
- List of Russian serial killers
