= Andrei Barausov =

Russian serial killer and rapist (born 1961)

- Born: Andrei Ivanovich Barausov; 5 August 1961 (age 65); Yakut ASSR, RSFSR
- Other names: "The Lensky Maniac" "The Yakutsk Chikatilo"
- Convictions: Murder x7 Rape
- Penalty: 18 years (1998); 18 years (2021); 21 years (2023)

Details
- Victims: 7
- Span of crimes: 1983–1997
- Country: Soviet Union, later Russia
- State: Sakha
- Date apprehended: For the final time in 2020

Andrei Ivanovich Barausov (Russian: Андрей Иванович Бараусов; born 5 August 1961), known as The Lensky Maniac (Russian: Ленский маньяк), is a Soviet-Russian serial killer and rapist who murdered at least 7 underage girls in Sakha from 1983 to 1997. Most of these killings remained unsolved until early January 2023, when Barausov, now serving a sentence for serial rape, confessed to them.

For his latest crimes, he was sentenced to 21 years imprisonment to be served concurrently with his 2018 conviction, consisting of 18 years.

== Biography ==
Little is known about Barausov's early life. Born on 5 August 1961, in the Yakut ASSR, he spent his childhood and youth in the city of Lensk, graduating from a local high school as a professional driver. From 1978 to 1980, he served in the Soviet Army, and after his demobilization, he returned to Lensk, where he married a local girl and had a daughter with her in 1981. A few years later, the couple had a son.

From the mid-1980s to 1997, Barausov worked as a driver for the Udachny Mining and Processing Combine, where he was well-regarded by employers and co-workers. He was not known to drink alcohol, and was noted for acting very politely towards women. Unbeknownst to many at the time, Barausov sexually abused his daughter, but no charges were ever brought in this case since she has refused to testify against him.

=== Crimes ===
In early 1997, Barausov's wife died of complications from cancer, after which he was left to live in an apartment with his two children. In early August, he went to the woods in Lensk at the height of the mushroom season, where he met two girls (aged 9 and 12, respectively) who were picking mushrooms. Brandishing a small-calibre TOZ-16 rifle, Barausov threatened them at gunpoint before eventually shooting one of the girls and stabbing the other to death. He then had sex with their corpses, and after he was finished, he covered up the bodies with leaves and moss.

As he was leaving the forest, Barausov came across a group of mushroom pickers whose car was stuck in a ditch and offered to help them out. After doing so, he spent some time in their company, allowing them to remember what he looked like. After the two girls' bodies were found, local authorities found a witness who identified each of the mushroom pickers from this group, ruling all of them out as suspects after interrogations. Each member gave a description of the good Samaritan that had helped them out, and after a sketch was drawn of the man, he became the prime suspect in the murders.

At around this time, a young woman went to the police department in Lensk, alleging that she had been raped at a park by an unfamiliar man. According to her testimony, she feigned loyalty to her attacker by offering to go to her apartment to have sex. The man accepted, and after spending the night together, he left without causing her any further harm. An important detail the victim remembered was that while they were still in the park, the rapist had pointed to a GAZ-66 parked near one of the buildings and claimed that it was his. Barausov, who lived in the building where the truck had been parked, was immediately considered a suspect due to a previous arrest for indecent exposure in 1991.

At the end of August 1997, Barausov was invited over to the police station and interrogated - to the investigators' surprise, he admitted to going to the forest on the day the two girls had been murdered but claimed that he was not involved. Under pressure from witness testimony, he first admitted to helping the mushroom pickers and, eventually, to the murders themselves. On the following day, he was escorted to the crime scene, where he demonstrated how he met the girls, how he had killed them and other details that only the killer could have known.

=== Confessions, trial, and imprisonment ===
Among the officers who detained Barausov were Vitaly Yegorov and Vladislav Pshennikov, the latter being the head investigator of the Lensk District Department of Internal Affairs. According to them, Barausov admitted to at least five additional murders and even indicated where he had buried them on a map, but expressed no remorse for his actions. In an interview given after his retirement, Pshennikov said that after hearing the confessions, he felt so disgusted that he contemplated shooting Barausov right then and there.

However, as no additional remains were found at the time and he retracted these confessions, Barausov was only charged with the double murder. In 1998, he was found guilty on all charges and sentenced to death, later reduced to 18 years imprisonment due to the moratorium on capital punishment imposed on the country. He was detained at the IK-9 colony in Altai Krai, where, despite the gravity of his acts, he was not despised by other convicts and even got a relatively prestigious position in the prison canteen.

After serving out his sentence in full, Barausov was released in 2015 and moved to the village of Glyadin in Altai Krai, where his daughter was living at the time. Upon learning that he had decided to stay in Altai Krai, Yegorov began writing letters to the Altai Ministry of Internal Affairs, demanding that Barausov be placed under strict administrative supervision.

Sometime later, Barausov moved to Novosibirsk Oblast, where he had found employment. During the late 2010s, he sexually assaulted six underage girls, but did not kill them. He was arrested for these crimes in 2020, tried in a secret trial, found guilty on all counts and sentenced to 18 years imprisonment. Due to the closed nature of his trial, much of the information remains undisclosed to the general public and media.

== New investigations and confessions ==
Following this latest conviction and after receiving no response from the Altai Ministry of Internal Affairs, Yegorov wrote two letters addressed to the Children's Rights Commissioner Anna Kuznetsova and the Chairman of the Investigative Committee of Russia Alexander Bastrykin. In these letters, Yegorov outlined a basic overview of the case and requested that they contact Barausov and ask him to confess to the murders, saying that his experience as a detective has taught him that life-sentenced prisoners like him have nothing to lose by confessing to unsolved crimes.

After receiving the letter, Bastrykin ordered that the old criminal cases be assigned to Alexei Kalachev, one of the most respected officers of the Investigative Committee of Yakutia. Not long after, investigators were dispatched to interview Barausov, who, on the advice of his lawyers, decided to make a plea deal with them. In exchange for a transfer to a penal colony with more relaxed conditions, he pleaded guilty to five murders and rapes, agreeing to show the burial sites and demonstrate how he killed each victim.

=== Serial murders ===
According to Barausov, he committed his first murder on 19 February 1983. On that day, his uncle's wedding was taking place in an apartment on Pervomaiskaya Street in Lensk, and after having a hearty meal and drinking, he went out for a walk. Armed with a knife and in an intoxicated state, he accidentally came across a woman named Elena Starilova near the Solnyshko kindergarten.

He claimed that he attempted to get her attention, but after she refused his advances, Barausov attacked her out of anger and stabbed her several times. He then dragged the mortally-wounded Starilova to a nearby arbour and tried to have sex with her, but fled when he heard that passers-by were approaching.

His next known murder was committed on 3 August 1991 - Barausov was driving by Oyunsky Street in Lensk when he saw two little girls, 4-year-old Marina V. and 5-year-old Katya G., standing on the road. He approached them with his truck and successfully convinced them to hop in, whereupon he drove them to a wooded area on the northwest edge of the city, where he raped and stabbed them to death near the Mukhtuyka River. He buried the girls' remains in shallow graves, which remained undiscovered until his confession.

In April 1992, Barausov was working as a driver for the Agricultural Support Department of the Udachny Mining and Processing Combine in Mirny. After unloading his truck, he drove back towards Lensk, where he spotted 25-year-old Lyudmila Nalivkina, who was hitchhiking by the road. He offered to take her home, to which she agreed - Barausov then drove her to her hometown late at night, but instead of leaving, he offered to have sex with her. Nalivkina refused but allowed him to walk her home. Barausov eventually suspected that she was deceiving him, whereupon he started bludgeoning her with a crowbar. He then dragged the unconscious girl into some nearby bushes, where he sexually assaulted her and then left. Nalivkina, who suffered a head injury during the assault, later died.

Barausov claimed that the last unsolved murder he was responsible for took place on 28 August 1994, in Lensk. On that date, he pretended to be an acquaintance to the parents of 5-year-old Yulia K., whom he lured into his truck. He then took her to an intersection on Ammosova and Oktyabrskaya Streets, where he stopped the truck, got out and opened the back door, requesting that the girl take the tools from a bag he was carrying. After the girl leaned over the back seat to the bag, Barausov struck her on the head with a tyre iron, causing her to lose consciousness. He then hid her in the back seat, and drove to the outskirts of the city near the Almaz pioneer camp, where he raped and then beat her to death. He then buried Yulia K.'s body in a shallow grave, which remained undiscovered until his arrest.

Four months later, on the evening of 22 December, Barausov came across three teenage girls while walking in the park. He tried to get acquainted with them and even put his arm around the waist of one of them, a 14-year-old named Tatiana. Terrified by the stranger, she broke free and told her friends to run, then began to run away herself. One of the girls, 15-year-old Rimma, stumbled and fell while attempting to run away - she was then caught by Barausov, who dragged her to a nearby construction site. He then raped her at gunpoint with a gas pistol, but for reasons unclear, did not kill her and simply left.

== Prosecution and imprisonment ==
Following his confessions, Barausov's trial for the five murders began on 28 March 2023, at the Lensk District Court. As part of his plea deal, he was spared life imprisonment and instead sentenced to 21 years imprisonment which, due to his age, is believed to be long enough for him to die in prison. Following the announcement of the verdict, Barausov retracted his confessions and declared that he had been pressured into confessing by investigators.

== See also ==
- List of Russian serial killers
- List of serial rapists
- Incidents of necrophilia
