= Andrei Roldugin =

Russian serial killer and rapist (born 1977)

- Born: Andrei Vladimirovich Roldugin; 1977 (age 48–49); Voronezh, Voronezh Oblast, RSFSR
- Other name: "The Voronezh Maniac"
- Convictions: Murder x3 Rape x9 Robbery x2
- Penalty: Life imprisonment

Details
- Victims: 3
- Span of crimes: 15 March – 17 August 2002
- Country: Russia
- State: Voronezh
- Date apprehended: 1 September 2002
- Imprisoned at: White Swan, Solikamsk, Perm Krai

Andrei Vladimirovich Roldugin (Russian: Андрей Владимирович Ролдугин; born 1977), known as the Voronezh Maniac (Russian: Воронежский маньяк, romanized: Voronezhsky manyak), is a Russian serial killer and rapist who committed a series of nine rapes and three murders in his hometown of Voronezh from 1996 to 2002. Caught shortly after the last killing, he admitted to his other crimes fully and was later sentenced to life imprisonment.

== Crimes ==
=== Early crimes ===
Roldugin committed his first crime at age 17, when he was convicted of robbery, but was paroled two years later for good behaviour. Beginning in 1996, he started abducting and raping women in the Povorinsky District of Voronezh but was never arrested for these crimes as the victims refused to go to the police. A year later, he was convicted of theft and sentenced to five years imprisonment but was paroled early for good behaviour on 3 September 2001.

=== Murders ===
Following his release from prison, Roldugin moved into his mother's apartment. Not long after, he resumed abducting and raping, this time focusing on teenagers within the city of Voronezh. On 15 March 2002, he encountered 15-year-old Marina Danilyants while she was walking to her school and convinced her to accompany him by telling her that he wanted to show her some puppies.

Roldugin then lured her to a grove outside the Northern car market, where he raped and strangled her. By that time, her family and friends had started searching for her after Danilyants did not come to school. Later that day, her body was found dumped in a storm drain not far from her house.

On 22 April, Roldugin lured 14-year-old Alexandra "Sasha" Sanina while she was walking home from school to the grove, where he raped and strangled her. By this time, the city began to panic over the disappearances of young schoolgirls, with many speculating that a serial offender was responsible, a theory that was initially considered unlikely by law enforcement officials. On the evening of 17 August, Roldugin lured two girls from a crowded area of the city to the grove, but on the way, one of them got scared and ran away. The other girl, 10-year-old Anya Totokhina, was raped and thereafter stabbed to death, with her body being found six days later near the village of Rybachy.

== Arrest, trial and imprisonment ==
Unlike the previous murders, where there were no known witnesses, an abundance of citizens came forward to claim that they had seen a young man accompanying the two girls on the day of Totokhina's disappearance. As per police procedure, officers started interviewing local hooligans in an attempt to gather potential suspects among ex-convicts, with one of them mentioning Roldugin. When the police came to question him about the killings, they learned that he fled the house. In response, the city issued a warrant for his arrest, with Roldugin being arrested on 1 September at the city's bus station, from where he planned to flee to Tambov.

At the subsequent interviews, Roldugin initially denied his guilt before confessing not only to the three murders but also to a total of nine rapes he had committed since 1996. When pressed for a reason as to why he started killing, he claimed that it was much easier to have sexual intercourse with a body after the victim had died. His guilt was further solidified when he showed where he had dumped Sanina's body. As a result, Roldugin was charged with three counts of murder, nine counts of rape and several counts of robbery and kidnapping.

Before the trial began, Roldugin was ordered to undergo a psychiatric evaluation, which ruled that he was sane at the time of the crimes. When he learned that he was facing the harshest punishment possible, that being life imprisonment, Roldugin complained that it was too severe, arguing that his cooperation should have been a mitigating factor. In addition, while he readily admitted to the killings, he claimed that the walks he had with the victims were 'mutually interesting' and that he wanted to show them how the real world works. His arguments were rejected, and Roldugin was convicted on all counts and sentenced to life imprisonment. He later attempted to appeal his sentence to the Supreme Court, which upheld the sentence. After his conviction, Roldugin was transferred to serve his sentence at the White Swan prison colony in Solikamsk, where he remains to this day.

== See also ==
- List of Russian serial killers
- List of serial rapists
- Incidents of necrophilia
