= Somsak Pornnarai =

Executed Laotian murderer, serial rapist and self-confessed serial killer

- Born: 1962; Laos
- Died: April 30, 1999 (aged 37); Bang Kwang Central Prison, Nonthaburi Province, Thailand
- Cause of death: Execution by shooting
- Other name: Saksit Khamsai
- Convictions: Murder; Rape; Attempted murder
- Penalty: Death

Details
- Victims: 1–3
- Span of crimes: 1980s–1995
- Country: Thailand; Laos (confessed)
- State: Loei
- Date apprehended: July 5, 1995
- Imprisoned at: Bang Kwang Central Prison

Somsak Pornnarai (Thai: สมศักดิ์ พรนารายณ์) or Saksit Khamsai (Lao: ສັກສິດ ຄຳໄຊ; 1962 – 30 April 1999) was a Laotian murderer, serial rapist and self-confessed serial killer who was convicted, sentenced to death and later executed for raping and murdering a 15-year-old teenager in Loei Province, Thailand. Prior to his execution, he confessed to numerous rapes and two murders committed in his native Laos.

== Early life ==
Much of Somsak's early life is shrouded in mystery, as most of the information came from his own recollections. According to him, he was born in an indeterminate region in 1962, and was supposedly employed in various menial jobs such as farming and gardening. Somsak claimed that he often used the services of prostitutes when he had money, but whenever he was unable to pay, he would instead lure the woman to a secluded place and rape her instead, claiming that he had lost count of how many he had raped.

== Crimes ==
=== In Laos ===
Somsak claimed that his first murder was committed in Laos, when he abducted a woman who attempted to resist being raped. He then beat her to death and threw her body into a nearby lake. He then claimed to have continued raping many other women who never reported the crimes to the police. At one point, he murdered another woman and again threw the body in a lake, but relatives of the deceased soon found it. After realizing that it was someone who was supposedly famous in the area, Somsak - with the help of some acquaintanes - acquired a fake Thai passport under the name "Saksit Khamsai" and fled to the Nakhon Ratchasima Province in Thailand.

=== In Thailand ===
During his stay in Nakhon Ratchasima, Somsak claimed to have not raped anyone, as he had enough money to afford the services of local prostitutes. However, he was later arrested for theft and imprisoned at the Nakhon Ratchasima Central Prison. While serving his sentence there, he befriended a Thai man, and after his release on June 7, 1995, Somsak was invited to stay over at the man's house in the Mueang Loei district in Loei Province.

As he had no permanent residence, Somsak agreed and accompanied him. However, before he could settle in, his sexual urges overtook him, leading him to travel to the nearby Chiang Khan district in search of a victim. There, he raped and attempted to kill a tricycle driver in the forest behind the Ban Na Sam School, but the victim survived. Fearing capture, Somsak fled back to the Mueang Loei district.

After moving into his new friend's house in Bu Hom, he learned that the man's two nieces were also living with him, but were currently working in Bangkok. One of them, 15-year-old Jarunee, returned one day to visit the housekeeper, whereupon she was met face-to-face with Somsak. Evidently smitten with her, he learned that she would be traveling to Bangkok again on July 4, 1995, which led to Somsak planning to have sex with her on that day.

While everyone in the house was asleep, he snuck into Jarunee's room, hugged her and then started to take off his clothes. When she woke up, he put his hand over her mouth and asked to sleep with her, but Jarunee refused and attempted to break free from his grasp. Somsak then grabbed a nearby towel and put it over her mouth, and then used an electrical cord to strangle her to death. After that, he raped her corpse, and then left the house. Jarunee's body was soon found by her younger sister.

== Arrest, trial, and execution ==
After finding Jarunee's corpse, her younger sister called the police and said that she had seen Somsak walking out of the house carrying a bag. Considering him the prime suspect, the local authorities searched for him until 4:30 PM, when they received a tip from a citizen who had seen Somsak at the bus stop in Chiang Khan. A police officer soon approached him, whereupon Somsak tried to flee, but was immediately detained.

Initially denying responsibility for the murder, he eventually confessed to killing Jarunee and the attempted murder of the tricycle driver, explaining that he could not control his sexual urges. He would later be put on trial for the crimes before the Loei Provincial Court, where he would be convicted and sentenced to death. His subsequent appeals to the Court of Appeals and the Supreme Court were denied, with King Bhumibol Adulyadej refusing to issue a royal pardon on March 27, 1999.

On April 30, 1999, Somsak was transferred to Bang Kwang Central Prison to face execution. Before official procedures could begin, he was obliged to give his fingerprints and undergo a background check. Somsak asked for a cigarette, and while smoking, he was asked to tell his personal story by Lt. Col. Komon Yimpuyai, head of the Criminal Registration Division. Somsak subsequently admitted that he was an illegal immigrant from Laos and that he acquired a fake Thai passport by paying a bribe to a corrupt official. He then wrote a letter in his native Lao, confessing to the numerous crimes committed in his native country.

After taking his fingerprints, the officer read out his execution order. Somsak's last meal consisted of plain rice, tofu soup with minced pork, khanom mo kaeng and a bottle of water. When he finished his meal, he said the following: "I admit that most Thai people are very kind. But I'm not doing well. I betrayed my benefactors and was ungrateful to the land that I fled in and lived. When I was sent to this prison, nobody ever bullied or harassed me. There was only pity and sympathy. If the next life is real, I wish to be born to atone for my crimes and return to the grace of this land". At 6:01 PM, he was shot by executioner Chaowaret Jaruboon, becoming the sixth person to be executed in Thailand since the resumption of executions in 1996.

== See also ==
- Capital punishment in Thailand
- List of serial rapists
- Incidents of necrophilia

== Bibliography ==
- Yut Bangkwang (2003). คำสารภาพสุดท้ายของนักโทษประหาร [Last confessions of death row prisoners] (in Thai). Bangkok: Matichon. ISBN 9743229752.
