= Rudolf Zimmermann =

Executed German serial killer

- Born: Rudolf Max Zimmermann; 16 April 1906; Wilschdorf, Dresden, Kingdom of Saxony, German Empire
- Died: 20 July 1940 (aged 34); Plötzensee Prison, Nazi Germany
- Cause of death: Execution by guillotine
- Other names: Johannes Weserberg "Hannes"; Wilhelm Wenzel
- Conviction: Murder x4
- Penalty: Death

Details
- Victims: 4
- Span of crimes: June – July 1940
- Country: Nazi Germany, Occupied Czechoslovakia
- States: Brandenburg, Mecklenburg-Vorpommern, Saxony-Anhalt, Egerland
- Date apprehended: 8 July 1940

Rudolf Max Zimmermann (16 April 1906 – 20 July 1940) was a German sex offender and serial killer who sexually abused and subsequently murdered four girls across Nazi Germany and Occupied Czechoslovakia during the summer of 1940. He was caught shortly after his final murder, convicted in a speedy trial, and subsequently executed.

== Early life and crimes ==
Zimmermann was born on 16 April 1906 in the village of Wilschdorf (now a district of Dresden), Kingdom of Saxony, the only son of locksmith Richard Max Zimmermann and his wife Olga Elvira Zimmermann (née Thieme). After successfully completing primary school, he began an apprenticeship as a gardener, but dropped out after a short time.

Little is known about his personal life, aside from the fact that he started committing petty crimes at an early age and that his first conviction was for aggravated theft. Between 1923 and 1937, he was repeatedly incarcerated for theft and forgery, spending a total of seven years behind bars.

In the early 1930s, Zimmermann's father helped him get a job as a milker at a manor in Silesia, but he quit after a short time due to his dislike of the heavy workload and strict discipline. Over the next two years, Zimmermann worked as a labourer and farmhand throughout the northern part of the German Reich – in addition to this legitimate work, he continued to commit thefts and burglaries.

=== Identity theft and alcoholism ===
In January 1939, Zimmermann arrived in Stralsund, where he stole the disability card from a man named Johannes Weser. He then forged it to read "Johannes Weserberg" and went to the employment office in Helmstedt, where he obtained an employment record book under his false name. With this document, Zimmermann found a job as the head milker on a farm in Boostedt.

He remained at the farm until 12 May 1940, when he abruptly decided to leave and travel to Hamburg and then to Magdeburg, before finally settling in the small town of Aken. Once there, Zimmermann started drinking vast quantities of beer, wine and schnapps, all of which, according to him, led to him developing an insatiable sex drive. This prompted him to seek out young prepubescent girls, as he found them sexually attractive and easy to lure due to his outwardly friendly demeanour.

== Crimes ==
=== Assault of Annie Hellwig ===
On 24 May 1940, 9-year-old Annie Hellwig was playing in the market square in Aken when she approached by an unfamiliar man. The stranger asked her to help him carry his suitcase in exchange for a Reichsmark. Since the man appeared friendly and well-groomed, Hellwig agreed. When she failed to return home that evening, Hellwig's mother reported her missing, leading to the local police to initiate a search for the little girl. Aided by soldiers from a nearby Wehrmacht base in Dessau, members of the Hitler Youth, the SA and local volunteers, the search teams covered a vast area and many fields, meadows, and forests near the town.

It was not until late afternoon on 25 May 1940 that rafters on a boat travelling on the Elbe reported to police that they had seen a girl on the opposite bank, near the village of Steutz. The search teams immediately went to the indicated location, where they found Hellwig alive. When questioned, she stated that she had met a man named "Hannes" from Hanover, whom she accompanied to a small cave in the woods. While there, she said that the man molested her and then spent the night with her inside the cave, only to abandon her there in the morning.

Despite an intensive search for the perpetrator, police were unable to identify and arrest "Hannes" at the time.

=== Murders ===
Approximately two weeks after the assault on Hellwig, on 10 June, Zimmermann travelled to Prenzlau, Brandenburg, where he lured away 7-year-old Inge Winkler from the market square with the promise of sweets. Other children attempted to dissuade Winkler from following him, but she did so anyway. A week later, on 17 June, a farm worker found her body in a rye field in Blindow. An autopsy confirmed that Winkler had been strangled and sexually assaulted post-mortem. Shortly afterwards, witnesses came forward to the police and reported seeing a man accompanying Winkler at the time of her disappearance. They described him as approximately 30 years of age, of strong build, with a tanned face, dressed in a green loden suit, high boots and a green hat with a tuft of chamois hair. Special attention was brought to the man's choice of hat, as it was only common in southern Germany. Reportedly, he also introduced himself as "Hans" or "Hannes", and supposedly was an agricultural worker. A reward of 1,000 Reichsmarks was offered for any information leading to a potential arrest.

On 22 June, Zimmermann arrived in Rostock, Mecklenburg-Vorpommern, where he lured 8-year-old Ingrid Karzek from the forest, where she had gone to pick up pine cones. The pair were spotted together by several witnesses, but as nothing outwardly unusual occurred, this was not reported to the police. A day later, Karzek's body was found in a ditch one kilometre away from her parents' house. She had been sexually abused and presumably drowned by her killer, as water was found inside her lungs.

Similarly to the Winkler murder, the perpetrator was described as a man with a tanned face, wearing an oversized blue jacket and a distinctive hat with a tuft of chamois hair. The police stations in Prenzlau and Rostock subsequently joined forces, and parents of minor children were warned not to let them play unsupervised. However, as media reports in the summer of 1940 were dominated by propaganda about the Wehrmacht's successes on various fronts, such notices were short and relegated to small columns in the newspapers.

On 3 July, Zimmermann abducted 6-year-old Hildegard Michaelis from Magdeburg's Friendrichstadt district, where she had gone to play with friends. As the police were notified quickly, the authorities were able to respond promptly and organized the largest operation in the city's history up until that time, involving over 2,500 members of the Hitler Youth and the Deutsches Jungvolk, as well as 500 soldiers from Wehrmacht. The searchers combed over the districts east of the Elbe, and found independent eyewitnesses claiming that they had seen a man with a small girl near the Mudra Barracks at around 3:15 PM. Three hours later, the pair were seen again on a dirt road near Randau, in southeastern Magdeburg.

Two days after the Michaelis abduction, Zimmermann murdered his final victim in the small community of Matzelbach, in what was then the Reichsgau Sudetenland, about 240 kilometers from Magdeburg. In that case, 8-year-old Marie Blatski was found lying in a barley field, wearing only a man's shirt. She had been sexually assaulted and had her throat slit with a knife, and was also seen in the company of a man wearing a dark suit, a light summer coat, and the hat with the tuft of chamois hair. The man carried a suitcase, had two red rings on his left hand, and introduced himself as a representative of an agricultural machinery factory in Hamburg. When queried, he stated that he had also spent some time in Hanover.

== Investigation and arrest ==
Following the Blatski murder, the investigation was taken over by the Reich Security Main Office. Its chief, Reinhard Heydrich, ordered a nation-wide manhunt for the murderer. In the meantime, Zimmermann continued travelling and ended up in Salzwedel, where he made several crucical mistakes that led to his capture.

On the night of 8 July 1940, he broke into a local clothing store and stole some clothes and textiles, which he attempted to sell at a Volkswagen factory in Gifhorn on the next day. The factory workers became suspicious when the man refused to accept their clothing ration cards, and one of them – a woman named Gertrud Denner – immediately notified the police, who subsequently arrested him. The man – introducing himself as "Wilhelm Wenzel" – was found not to have a valid license, and was quickly linked to the theft in Salzwedel. Authorities found a luggage ticket for a suitcase he had stored at the local train station, which they planned to retrieve to find more information about the detainee.

On the night of 9 July, Zimmermann successfully escaped from his prison cell – using a piece of metal he managed to pull out of the chimney shaft, he dug a passage under the cell door and fled, intent on getting his luggage and fleeing. However, the moment he arrived at the train station, he was detained by the officers waiting for him. They then searched through his belongings, finding clothing that resembled the suspects in the recent murders, including the hat with the tuft of chamois hair, as well as a blood-soaked rucksack in the suitcase.

== Confessions, trial, and execution ==
After several hours of intense interrogation at the police station in Magdeburg, Zimmermann broke down and confessed to each of the four murders. He admitted to luring the young victims with sweets, even buying a bouquet of red flowers for Michaelis. When asked about what he did to her body, he said that he threw it into the Elbe. He also stated that the sole reason for him not killing Hellwig was because she did not resist the sexual assault.

He was subsequently transferred to the police headquarters at Alexanderplatz in Berlin, where his crimes were reconstructed during additional interrogations. During said interrogations, Zimmermann expressed no remorse and admitted to killing the girls on a whim, indicating that he got used to killing more and more each time, and that he had no plans of stopping. He was then scheduled to undergo a forensic psychiatric evaluation to determine whether he was capable of standing trial.

During the evaluation, Zimmermann insisted that he lived an unremarkable life up until the spring of 1940, when he was kicked in the groin by a cow he was milking. The incident necessitated that one of his testicles had to be removed. He claimed that this, coupled with his alcoholism, led to him developing an increased sex drive and a desire to rape and kill young girls. The examining experts disregarded his explanations, and instead suggested that while his alcoholism was a small factor, Zimmermann's crimes were carefully planned out in advance and premeditated, and that he was fully aware of what he was doing.

On 18 July 1940, the trial of Rudolf Zimmermann commensed before the Sondergericht 1 in Berlin. In his opening statement, the Reich Public Prosecutor emphasized Zimmermann's violent nature, confessions, and the autopsy results as overwhelming evidence for his guilt. Zimmermann himself repeated said confessions in court, again reiterating that he would have continued killing had he not been arrested.

The trial lasted only a few hours, after which Zimmermann was found guilty on all counts and subsequently sentenced to death. In addition, he was deprived of all his civil rights and ordered to pay restitution for the costs of the trial. As Nazi law forbid him from filing an appeal against his conviction, Zimmermann was guillotined at the Plötzensee Prison two days after the trial's conclusion.

=== Aftermath and impact ===
Zimmermann's crimes led to increased warnings from the government aimed at parents and educators to be more watchful of the children in their care, as well as the dangers of letting them approach strangers.

On 4 August, officers from the Kriminalpolizei found the body of Hildegard Michaelis in a cornfield in Magdeburg's Prester district. The discovery contradicted Zimmermann's claims that he had thrown the body after killing the girl, as an autopsy suggested that she was still alive when thrown into the water.

== See also ==
- List of German serial killers

== Books ==
- Krüger, Wolfgang; Kirschlager, Michael. Kriminalchronik des Dritten Reiches / Serienmörder des Dritten Reiches: 1933–1945 [Crime Chronicle of the Third Reich / Serial Killers of the Third Reich: 1933–1945] (in German). Kirschlager Publishing. ISBN 3934277551.
