= Melvin Rees =

American serial killer

- Melvin Rees in handcuffs being escorted by authorities
- Born: Melvin David Rees; January 21, 1928; Maryland, U.S. (unconfirmed)
- Died: July 10, 1995 (aged 67); MCFP Springfield, Springfield, Missouri, U.S.
- Other name: The Sex Beast
- Convictions: Federal; Kidnapping; Maryland; First degree murder Virginia; First degree murder
- Penalty: Federal; Life imprisonment Maryland; Life imprisonment Virginia; Death; commuted to life imprisonment

Details
- Victims: 5–9+ (suspected of a victim count high as 20 victims)
- Span of crimes: 26 June 1957 – 11 January 1959
- Country: United States
- States: Maryland, Virginia
- Date apprehended: June 24, 1960; 66 years ago

Melvin David Rees (January 21, 1928 – October 26, 1995) was an American serial killer who committed five murders in Virginia and Maryland between 1957 and 1959. He murdered and sexually assaulted (in that order) Margaret Harold, the girlfriend of US Army soldier Sgt. Roy D. Hudson, during a highway encounter near Annapolis. Two years later, he tortured and murdered the four members of the Jackson family near Fredericksburg, Virginia. After his conviction for the killings, Rees confessed to two other murders, and authorities believed he was involved in two more. Rees was tried in three courts, receiving life terms in federal court and in Maryland and a death sentence in Virginia. However, Rees was never executed due to concerns over his mental capacity. He died in prison in 1995.

Prior to his arrest and imprisonment, Rees was a lover of actress and topless dancer Pat Barrington and was a prominent jazz musician in the Washington, D.C. area.

== Early life ==
Little is known about Rees' childhood and upbringing and some rumors suggest he was born in the UK but disowned and sent away to live in America at a very young age. He attended Edwards Military Institute in Salemsburg, NC and the Woodward School for Boys in Washington, DC before graduating from Hyattsville High School in Maryland. He entered the army in October 1946, serving as a military musician in Europe until his discharge in 1953. After returning to the US, Rees attended the University of Maryland (UMD) in College Park, just outside Washington, D.C. Classmates at UMD would later recall Rees being a talented musician, showing skill with the saxophone, piano, and clarinet. Rees dropped out of UMD before he could graduate, ostensibly to pursue a musical career. He travelled around the D.C. area, playing at local jazz clubs.

In July 1954, he married fellow UMD student Elaine Rachmaninoff. The marriage lasted 5 years and the couple had a son, Philip.

In 1955, Rees was arrested on charges of assaulting an unidentified 36-year-old woman. Rees had tried to force her into his car, but she escaped. The victim, however, did not press charges, and the case against Rees was dropped. By 1959, Rees was living in Hyattsville, Maryland, with actress and topless dancer Pat Barrington, who was later identified in press reports as his wife. The couple eventually moved to West Memphis, Arkansas, where Rees had taken a temporary job in a piano shop. It was in West Memphis where Rees was apprehended on June 24, 1960.

== Murders ==
=== Margaret Harold ===
On June 26, 1957, Margaret Harold and her boyfriend—a U.S. Army sergeant on weekend leave—were traveling near Annapolis, Maryland when Rees, driving his green Chrysler, forced them off the road. After exiting the vehicle, Rees gestured at the couple to roll down their car window, displaying a nickel-plated .38 revolver. After being refused demands for cigarettes and money, an angered Rees shot Harold point-blank in the face. The horrified soldier fled the scene and ran across several rural fields before reaching a farmhouse, where he called the police. As the soldier was being picked up at the farmhouse, other officers arrived at the crime scene, where they found that Rees had removed the deceased Harold's clothing and sexually assaulted her.

Upon searching the area for the then-unidentified Rees, authorities came across an abandoned cinder block-constructed building, noticing a basement window that had been broken into. Inside, investigators discovered a collection of violent pornographic images and autopsy photos of female corpses, taped all over the walls. They also discovered a yearbook photo of Wanda Tipton, a 1945 graduate at UMD. Police managed to contact and question Tipton, who denied knowing a tall, dark-haired man described by the soldier as Harold's killer. Since there were few new leads — and since forensic science was primitive in 1957 — Harold's murder became a cold case until Rees killed again two years later.

=== Jackson Family ===
On January 11, 1959, the Jackson family—Carroll Jackson and his wife Mildred, 18-month-old Janet and five-year-old Susan—disappeared after visiting relatives in the Apple Grove area. The Jacksons were by all accounts a normal family who had no known enemies, making their disappearance especially baffling. A female relative of the Jacksons, who was also driving home from the same Apple Grove reunion, came across Carroll Jackson's abandoned car on the side of the road. The relative called the police, who inspected the car and found no indications of any struggle. A massive search effort was called to locate the missing family, but it was unsuccessful.

Almost two months later, on March 4, two men gathering brush near Fredericksburg discovered the decomposing body of Carroll Jackson in a ditch. He had been shot in the back of the head. His hands were also tied behind his back. Upon recovering the body, police discovered that Carroll's body had been dumped on top of his 18-month-old daughter Janet Jackson; it was later determined that the child had been put alive in the ditch before her father, and had suffocated under the weight of his body. On March 21, the bodies of Mildred and Susan Jackson were discovered in a forest near Annapolis, showing signs of torture and pre-mortem sexual assault.

== Investigation and manhunt ==
Soon after the Jacksons' disappearance, a local couple came forward to report that they had had a frightening experience with a tall, dark-haired man that same afternoon. The man had driven behind and around them in a blue, older-model Chevrolet, flashing his headlights and forcing them off the road. The man later got out of his car and menacingly approached the couple; sensing danger, they reversed and managed to flee the scene. After Mildred and Susan Jackson's bodies were found, detectives discovered an abandoned building near their dump site—reportedly the same cinderblock structure that had been searched after Margaret Harold's killing. Inside, they found a red button missing from Mildred's dress, indicating that she had been taken there after being kidnapped. Near the building were fresh tire marks. After finding points of comparison between the Harold and Jackson cases—mainly the general area of the murders and the sadistic nature of the crimes—investigators determined that both homicides were committed by the same culprit.

The murder investigation became a media sensation with the involvement of self-proclaimed psychic Peter Hurkos, who visited the gravesite of the Jacksons in Falls Church, Virginia and handled their possessions, allegedly using his powers to accurately describe the murders and the positions in which their bodies were found. Hurkos visited the site of the Margaret Harold murder, and told investigators that the same killer had murdered the Jacksons. He also made various predictions about the outcome of the case, saying that it would be solved within two weeks and that the killer would ultimately be indicted for nine murders. Hurkos reportedly led investigators to the house of one of their main suspects, a trash collector who confessed to the murders; with the later apprehension of Rees, however, Hurkos and his claims about the case were ridiculed by The Washington Post.

An anonymous source—later identified as Glenn Moser of Norfolk, Virginia—sent a letter to the Fredericksburg authorities, suggesting that they look into Rees. Moser explained that he and Rees often engaged in heady philosophical conversations, one of which had been about whether murder could be considered acceptable. Rees, under the influence of benzedrine, confided to Moser that he considered murder to just be another part of the "human experience" that he eagerly wanted to take part in. "You can't say it's wrong to kill," Rees reportedly told Moser. "Only individual standards make it right or wrong."

The discussion took place the day before the Jacksons disappeared. Upon hearing of their murders months later, Moser suspected Rees of killing the family. Moser confronted Rees about the murders. While Rees did not confess to the killings, he also didn't deny responsibility and became evasive. In his anonymous letter, Moser also voiced his suspicion of Rees in Margaret Harold's murder in 1957, as the two men were working in the Annapolis area as salesmen at the time.

Authorities decided to follow the lead and question Rees, only to find that he had moved out of his house and left no forwarding address. They also searched for Rees at the jazz clubs where he was known to have performed, but were still unable to locate him. Upon running a background check, police discovered that he had attended the University of Maryland and dated Wanda Tipton, their person of interest in the Margaret Harold investigation. Upon further questioning, Tipton admitted to having a relationship with Rees, but broke it off after Rees claimed to be married.

== Arrest and death ==
Moser came forward in 1960 to tell authorities that Rees had contacted him and was currently employed at a music store in West Memphis, Arkansas. Rees was ultimately arrested, and after searching his home police found notes describing the Jackson family's murders. The man who witnessed Margaret Harold's killing confirmed that Rees was indeed the man he saw kill Harold.

Rees was convicted by the state of Maryland of Harold's murder and sentenced to life in prison. In 1961, he was convicted in a federal court of the interstate kidnapping and murder of Mildred Ann Jackson under the Federal Kidnapping Act and sentenced to life in prison. Virginia added a death sentence for the other four murders. However, Rees was never executed due to his mental incapacity to assist in his own defense. His sentence was eventually reduced to life in prison in 1972. Melvin Rees died in federal custody at MCFP Springfield in Missouri in 1995.

Investigators also suspected that Rees was responsible for four homicides in the area around the University of Maryland. Teenagers Mary Shomette, Michael Ann ("Mikie") Ryan, Mary Fellers, and Shelby Venable were all found raped and killed in separate incidents. Rees was never charged in any of those four murders.

== Miscellaneous ==
Rees' habeas corpus case reached the Supreme Court in 1967 due to his being incompetent—he was diagnosed a schizophrenic—but SCOTUS put their decision on hold until his death decades later, at which point they just put a lid on it with two words: “Certiorari dismissed.” However, in 2013 they made a nine to zero decision written by Justice Clarence Thomas so their earlier indecision couldn't be used as a precedent in other cases in which incompetent defendants might evade the death penalty.

Fellow musicians called him Dave.

Purportedly, Rees told a reporter in 1985 about two additional murders in 1956, that of Shelby Venable and Mary Fellers.

Rees was exonerated for some of the murders he was suspected of, namely that of Nancy Shomette and Michael Ryan, as someone else confessed.

== Bibliography and further reading ==
- Bahr, Jeff; Taylor, Troy; Coleman, Loren (2007). Weird Virginia: Your Travel Guide to Virginia's Local Legends and Best Kept Secrets. Sterling Publishing Company, Inc. ISBN 978-1-4027-3942-2.
- Cimino, Al (September 1, 2026). Deadly Serial Killers: Chilling Tales of the World's Worst Criminals. Arcturus Publishing. ISBN 978-1-3988-5956-2.
- Holston, Arthur Franklin (1962). A Study of the Status of Judicial Canon 35 and Its Impact on Television in the Legal Process. Michigan State University.
- Lane, Brian; Gregg, Wilfred (1995). The Encyclopedia of Serial Killers. Berkley Books. ISBN 978-0-425-15213-3.
- Mayo, Mike (February 1, 2008). American Murder: Criminals, Crimes, and the Media. Visible Ink Press. ISBN 978-1-57859-227-2.
- Nash, Jay (2004). Great Pictorial History of World Crime: Murder. History, Incorporated. ISBN 978-1-928831-22-8.
- Newton, Michael (2006). The Encyclopedia of Serial Killers. Infobase. ISBN 978-0-8160-6987-3.
- Thomas, Donald (1993). Dead Giveaway: Murder Avenged from the Grave. Michael O'Mara Books. ISBN 978-1-85479-172-6.
- Wilson, Colin (1995). The Killers among Us: Sex, Madness, and Mass Murder. New York: Warner. ISBN 978-0-446-60327-0.
