= Jardim Floresta, Rio Grande do Sul =

Neighborhood in Porto Alegre

Coordinates: 30°00′00″S 51°09′33″W

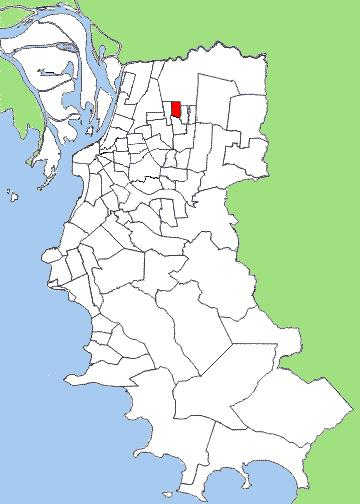
The Jardim Floresta neighbourhood of the city of Porto Alegre, Brazil.

Jardim Floresta (meaning Forest Garden in English) is a neighbourhood (bairro) in the city of Porto Alegre, the state capital of Rio Grande do Sul, in Brazil. It was created by Law 2022 from December 7, 1959.
