= François Bertrand =

French Army sergeant (1823–1878)

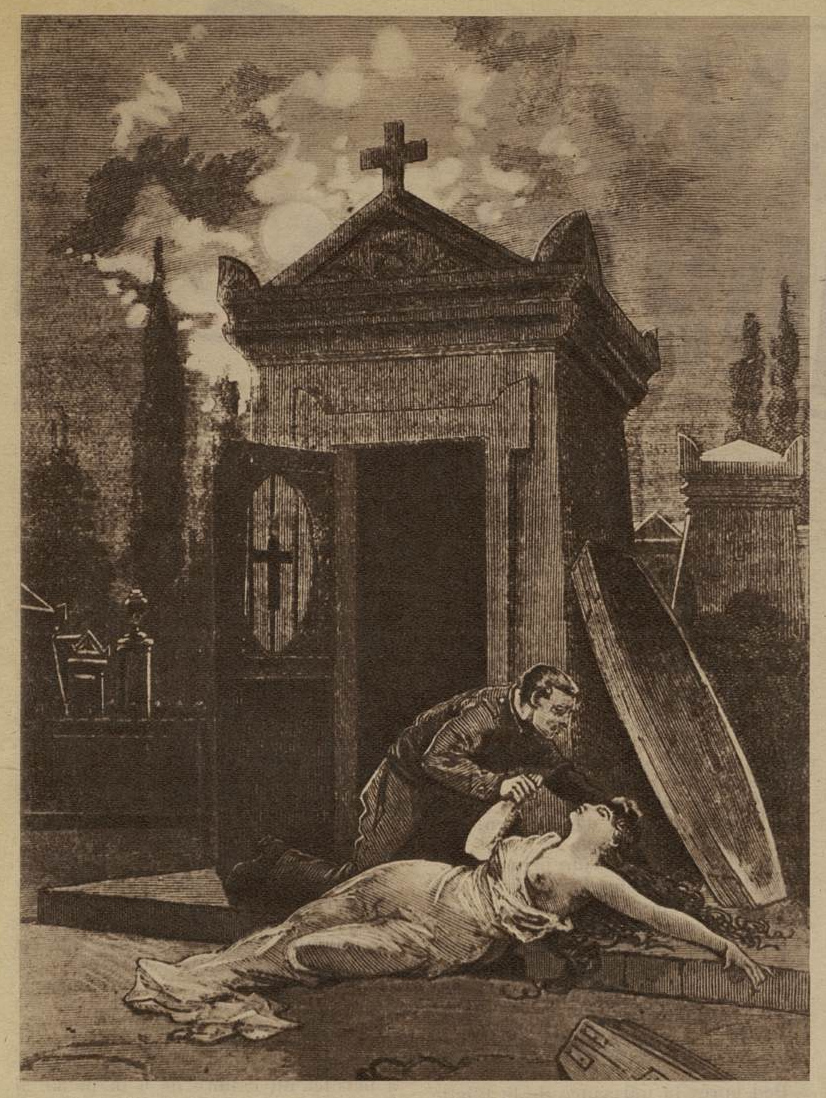
The Vampire, engraving depicting Sergeant François Bertrand, from the Mémoires de M. Claude, chef de la police de sûreté sous le Second Empire, c. 1880

Sergeant François Bertrand (1823–1878), known as the Vampire of Montparnasse, was a sergeant in the French Army. He was arrested in 1849 for necrophilia and jailed for one year. In 1856, he moved to Le Havre. In his later life, he worked as clerk, mailman, and lighthouse keeper. He died on 25 February 1878.

== Biography ==
According to his birth certificate, Bertrand was born on 29 October 1823 in Voisey, Haute-Marne. Bertrand began dissecting dead cats and dogs early in life. He stated that his necrophilic impulses began in 1846, and were accompanied by headaches and heart palpitations. He progressed to exhuming the corpses of both women and men from graveyards, whereupon he would eviscerate and dismember them before masturbating. Bertrand would later describe his experience with the corpse of a 16-year-old girl:

"I covered it with kisses and pressed it wildly to my heart. All that one could enjoy with a living woman is nothing in comparison with the pleasure I experienced. After I had enjoyed it for about a quarter of an hour, I cut the body up, as usual, and tore out the entrails. Then I buried the cadaver again."

Between summer 1848 and March 1849, a series of bodies were exhumed and found severely mutilated in cemeteries of Paris. On 15 March 1849 Bertrand admitted himself to the Val-de-Grâce with gunshot wounds. A gravedigger at Montparnasse Cemetery overheard the news about Bertrand's injury, and realized that he must be the same person hit by his colleague's booby trap. (A different source states that Bertrand was wounded by a police bullet at the cemetery.) One of Bertrand's surgeons obtained a full confession. Bertrand was arrested and sentenced to one year in jail.

== Legacy ==
Bertrand's case prompted Joseph Guislain to coin the term necrophilia. He was also discussed extensively by other early theorists of necrophilia, including Richard von Krafft-Ebing and Havelock Ellis.
