= Necrophilia =

Mental disorder involving sexual attraction to corpses

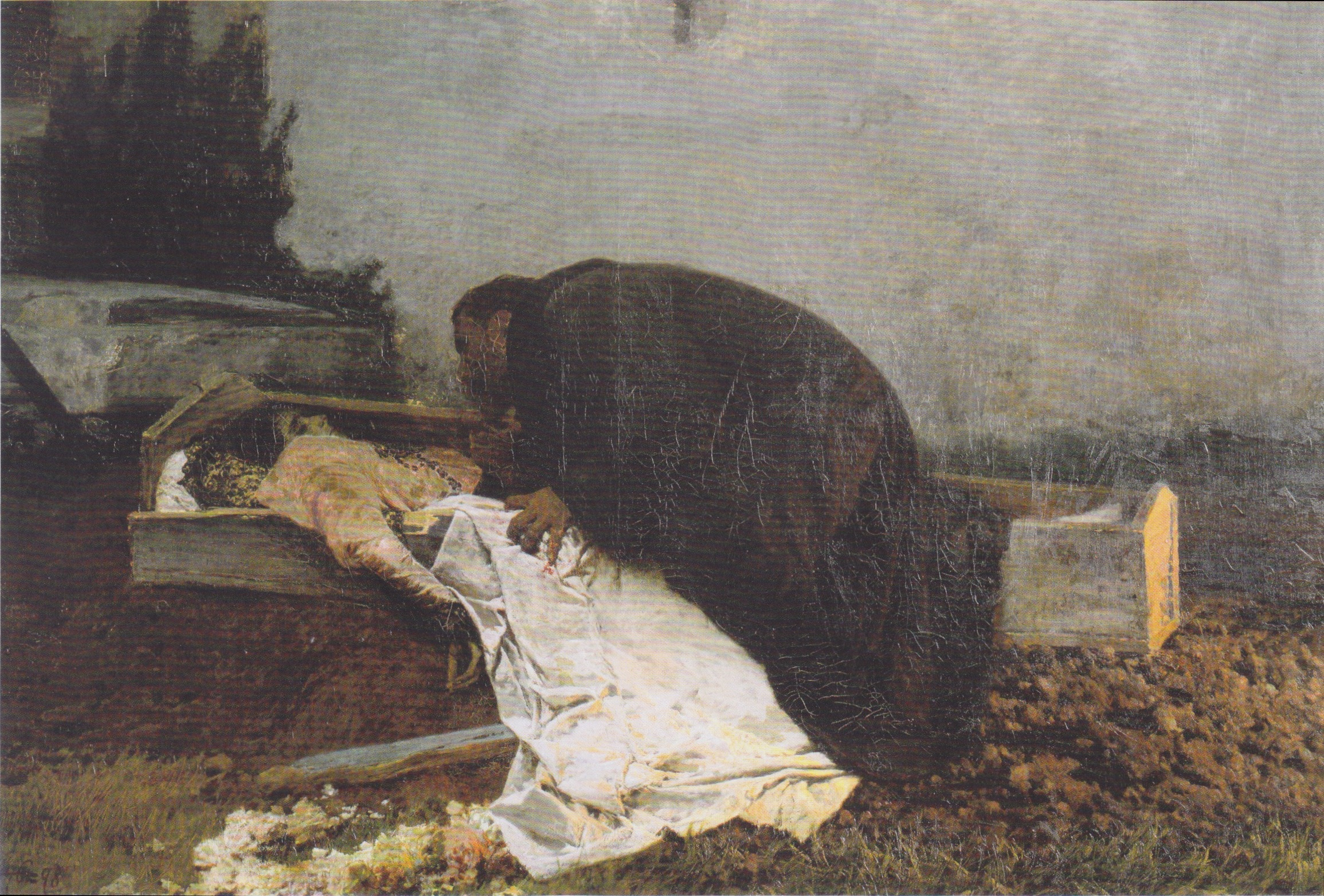
The Hatred, painting by Pietro Pajetta (1896)

Necrophilia, also known as necrophilism, necrolagnia, necrocoitus, necrochlesis, and thanatophilia, is sexual attraction or acts involving corpses, including both direct intercourse with corpses and sexual excitement at the thought or presence of one. It is classified as a paraphilia by the World Health Organization (WHO) in its International Classification of Diseases (ICD) diagnostic manual, as well as by the American Psychiatric Association in its Diagnostic and Statistical Manual (DSM). Reported motivations vary widely, ranging between sexual domination of a non-responsive partner, fetishization of death and corpses, and bereavement of a close sexual partner. Necrophilia can coincide with sexual roleplay of the subject instead pretending to be a corpse while their partner takes on the role of the necrophile.

In contrast to human paraphilias, many cases of animal necrophilia (also known as Davian behavior) have been observed, primarily as a result of being unable to distinguish between a receptive mate and a recently deceased one. Some species of arthropod and frog can instead fully procreate with a recently killed mate.

== Origins of term ==
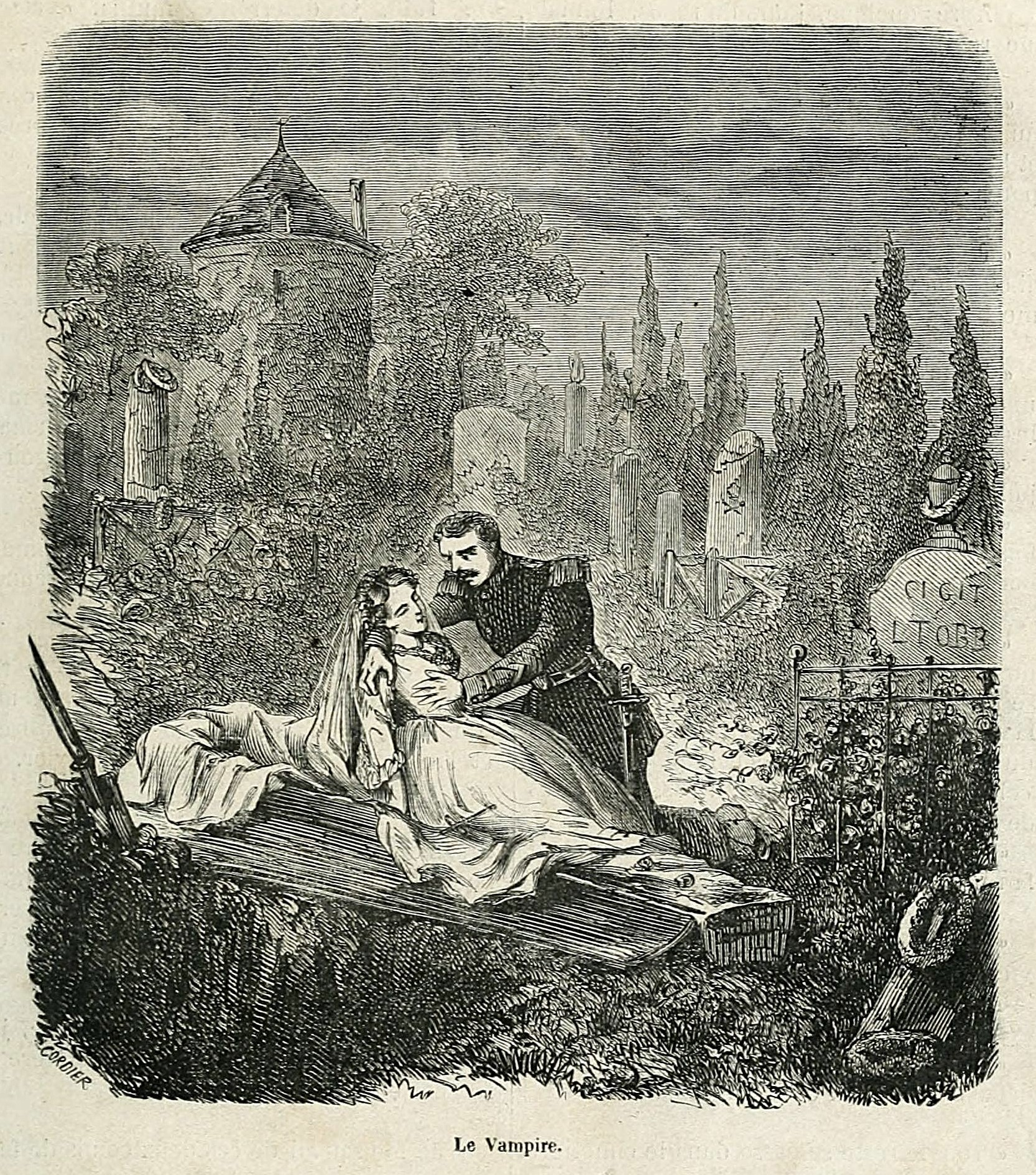
The Vampire, engraving depicting Sergeant François Bertrand, 1878

Various terms for the crime of corpse violation animate seventeenth- through nineteenth-century works on law and legal medicine. The plural term "nécrophiles" was coined by Belgian physician Joseph Guislain in his lecture series, Leçons Orales Sur Les Phrénopathies, given around 1850, about the contemporary necrophiliac François Bertrand:

It is within the category of the destructive madmen [aliénés destructeurs] that one needs to situate certain patients to whom I would like to give the name of necrophiliacs [nécrophiles]. The alienists have adopted, as a new form, the case of Sergeant Bertrand, the disinterred of cadavers on whom all the newspapers have recently reported. However don't think that we are dealing here with a form of phrenopathy that appears for the first time. The ancients, in speaking about lycanthropy, have cited examples to which one can more or less relate the case which has just now attracted the public attention so strongly.

Psychiatrist Bénédict Morel popularised the term about a decade later when discussing Bertrand.

== Classification ==
In the Diagnostic and Statistical Manual of Mental Disorders, fifth edition, Text Revision (DSM-5-TR), recurrent, intense sexual interest in corpses can be diagnosed under Other Specified Paraphilic Disorder (necrophilia) when it causes marked distress or impairment in important areas of functioning.

Forensic Psychologist Anil Aggrawal introduced a ten-tier classification of necrophiliacs based on the increasing severity of the disorder.

| Class | Name | Characteristics |
|---|---|---|
| Class I | Role players | People who get aroused when pretending their partner is dead during sexual activity. |
| Class II | Romantic necrophiliacs | Bereaved people who remain attached to their dead lover's body. |
| Class III | Necrophiliac fantasizers | People who fantasize about necrophilia but do not physically interact with corpses. |
| Class IV | Tactile necrophiliacs | People who are aroused by touching or stroking a corpse, without engaging in intercourse. |
| Class V | Fetishistic necrophiliacs | People who remove objects or body parts from a corpse for sexual fetishes, without engaging in intercourse. |
| Class VI | Necromutilomaniacs | People who derive pleasure from mutilating a corpse while masturbating, without engaging in intercourse. |
| Class VII | Opportunistic necrophiliacs | People who normally have no interest in necrophilia but take the opportunity when it arises. |
| Class VIII | Regular necrophiliacs | People who preferentially have intercourse with the dead. |
| Class IX | Homicidal necrophiliacs | Necrosadists, people who murder someone to have sex with the victim. |
| Class X | Exclusive necrophiliacs | People who have an exclusive interest in sex with the dead and cannot perform at all for a living partner. |

== In humans ==
=== History ===
In the ancient world sailors returning corpses to their home country were often accused of necrophilia. Singular accounts of necrophilia in history are sporadic, though written records suggest the practice was present within Ancient Egypt. Herodotus writes in The Histories that, to discourage intercourse with a corpse, ancient Egyptians left the corpses of particularly high-ranking or beautiful women to decay for "three or four days" before giving them to the embalmers. Herodotus also alluded to suggestions that Periander had defiled the corpse of his wife, employing a metaphor that the tyrant "baked his bread in a cold oven". Hittite law from the 16th century BC through to the 13th century BC explicitly permitted sex with the dead.

Necrophilia against men is depicted on ceramics from the Moche culture, which reigned in northern Peru from the first to eighth century CE. A common theme in these artifacts is the masturbation of a male skeleton by a living woman. In what is now Northeast China, the ethnic Xianbei emperor Murong Xi (385–407) of the Later Yan state had intercourse with the corpse of his beloved empress Fu Xunying after the latter was already cold and put into the coffin.

In Renaissance Italy, following the reputed moral collapse brought about by the Black Death and before the Roman Inquisition of the Counter-Reformation, literature was replete with sexual references; these include necrophilia, as in the epic poem Orlando Innamorato by Matteo Maria Boiardo, first published in 1483.

In a notorious modern example, American serial killer Jeffrey Dahmer was a necrophiliac. Dahmer wanted to create a sex slave who would mindlessly consent to whatever he wanted. When his attempts failed and his male victim died he would keep the corpse until it decomposed beyond recognition, masturbating and performing sexual intercourse on the body. He would perform sexual activities before and after murdering his victims. Dahmer explained that he killed his victims only because he did not want them to leave. Other modern necrophiliacs include Scottish serial killer Dennis Nilsen, and the Englishman David Fuller, who is considered the worst offender of this kind in English legal history.

=== Research ===
Necrophilia is often assumed to be rare but no data for its prevalence in the general population exists. Some necrophiliacs only fantasize about the act, without carrying it out. In 1958, Klaf and Brown commented that, although rarely described, necrophiliac fantasies may occur more often than is generally supposed.

Havelock Ellis, in his 1903 volume of Studies of the Psychology of Sex, believed that necrophilia was related to algolagnia, in that both involve the transformation of a supposed negative emotion, such as anger, fear, disgust or grief, into sexual desire.

Rosman and Resnick (1989) reviewed 123 cases of necrophilia. The sample was divided into genuine necrophiliacs, who had a persistent attraction to corpses, and pseudo-necrophiliacs, who acted out of opportunity, sadism or transient interest. Of the total, 92% were male and 8% were female. 57% of the genuine necrophiliacs had occupational access to corpses, with morgue attendant, hospital orderly and cemetery employee being the most common jobs. The researchers theorized that either of the following situations could be antecedents to necrophilia:

1. The necrophiliac develops poor self-esteem, perhaps due in part to a significant loss;
  (a) They are very fearful of rejection by others and they desire a sexual partner who is incapable of rejecting them; and
  (b) They are fearful of the dead, and transform their fear—utilizing reaction formation—into a desire.
2. They develop an exciting fantasy of sex with a corpse, sometimes after exposure to a corpse.

=== Motives ===
The most common motive for necrophiliacs is the possession of a partner who is unable to resist or reject them. However, in the past, necrophiliacs have expressed having more than one motive.

The authors reported that of their sample of 34 genuine necrophiliacs:

- 68% were motivated by a desire for a non-resisting and non-rejecting partner
- 21% were motivated by a want for a reunion with a lost partner
- 15% were motivated by sexual attraction to dead people
- 15% were motivated by a desire for comfort or to overcome feelings of isolation
- 12% were motivated by a desire to remedy low self-esteem by expressing power over a corpse

Lesser common motives include:

- Unavailability of a living partner
- Compensation for fear of women
- Belief that sex with a living woman is a mortal sin
- Need to achieve a feeling of total control over a sexual partner
- Compliance with a command hallucination
- Performance of a series of destructive acts
- Expression of polymorphous perverse sexual desires
- Need to perform limitless sexual activity

IQ data was limited, but not abnormally low. About half of the sample had a personality disorder, and 11% of true necrophiliacs were psychotic. Rosman and Resnick concluded that their data challenged the conventional view of necrophiliacs as generally psychotic, mentally deficient, or unable to obtain a consenting partner.

At least one case has been documented of someone having sex with a corpse motivated by the dead person's wishes. A woman in Zimbabwe had sex with her deceased husband's body under the influence of his wishes (documented in his will) and the influence of family members, persuading her to fulfill his wishes.

== Case studies ==
=== Jerry Brudos ===
Jerry Brudos (1939–2006) was an American serial killer from Salem, Oregon, who murdered four young women between 1968 and 1969, motivated by his extreme fetishism for women's feet. Brudos engaged in sexual activity with the corpses of his victims, dressing the bodies and mutilating them. His necrophiliac actions included, in one case, hanging the body of the young female victim from hooks attached to the garage's roof and administering bolts of electricity in an attempt to make the corpse "dance" for his sexual gratification.

=== Ted Bundy ===
Ted Bundy (1946–1989) was an American serial killer who raped and murdered at least 30 young women during the 1970s. He also confessed to participating in necrophilic acts, claiming to have chosen secluded disposal sites for his victims' bodies specifically for post-mortem sexual intercourse.

=== Andrei Chikatilo ===
Serial killer Andrei Chikatilo (1936–1994) was a Soviet serial killer who operated in different countries of the Soviet Union between 1978 and 1990. He was known for molesting the corpses of his victims, mostly young children. Chikatilo also engaged in other acts of necrophilia, achieving orgasm by stabbing or mutilating the bodies.

=== Jeffrey Dahmer ===
Serial killer Jeffrey Dahmer (1960–1994) was known to perform oral sex or masturbate, or both, upon the corpses of his victims before dismembering them. In unguarded, taped interviews with his defense attorney Wendy Patrickus, Dahmer explicitly stated that he had sex with his victims before and after their deaths. He explained that he wanted to remain with the person as long as possible, preserving some of his victims' selected organs, skeletal tissue, and bones.

=== Luis Garavito ===
Luis Garavito (1957–2023) was a Colombian serial killer who murdered more than 100 young boys in the 1990s in his native country of Colombia, as well as in neighboring Ecuador and Venezuela. He was known to sexually assault and mutilate some of the bodies.

=== Karen Greenlee ===
In 1987, Karen Greenlee gave a detailed interview called "The Unrepentant Necrophile" for Jim Morton's (edited by Adam Parfrey) book Apocalypse Culture. In this interview, she stated that she had a preference for younger men and was attracted to the smell of blood and death. She considered necrophilia an addiction. The interview was held in her apartment, which was a small studio filled with books, necrophilic drawings, and satanic adornments. She also had written a confession letter in which she claimed to have abused 20–40 male corpses.

=== Tsutomu Miyazaki ===
Tsutomu Miyazaki (1962–2008) was a Japanese serial killer who kidnapped and murdered four young girls aged four to seven in the late 1980s. When Miyazaki was arrested in July 1989 after attempting to abduct another girl, police found video tapes at his Tokyo apartment containing footage of sexual abuse of one of the girls' corpses. Miyazaki later confessed to engaging in sexual activity with the victims' bodies.

=== Dennis Nilsen ===
Dennis Nilsen (1945–2018) was a Scottish serial killer who had developed a connection between death and intimacy, later finding posing as a corpse a source of sexual arousal. In 1978, Nilsen committed his first murder and sexually violated the victim's corpse, keeping the body for months before disposal. Nilsen was reported to have sexually abused the corpses of various victims until his arrest.

== Legality ==
=== Australia ===
Necrophilia is not explicitly mentioned in Australian law; however, under New South Wales' Crimes Act 1900 – Sect 81C, penalized for misconduct about corpses is any person who:

(a) indecently interferes with any dead human body, or

(b) improperly interferes with, or offers any indignity to, any dead human body or human remains (whether buried or not), and

shall be liable to imprisonment for two years.

=== Brazil ===
Article 212 of the Brazilian Penal Code (federal Decree-Law No 2.848) states as follows:

Art. 212 – To abuse a cadaver or its ashes:
Penalty: detention, from 1 to 3 years, plus fine.

Although sex with a corpse is not explicitly mentioned, a person who has sex with a corpse may be convicted of a crime under the above Article. The legal asset protected by such an Article is not the corpse's objective honor, but the feeling of good memories, respect, and veneration that living people keep about the deceased person: these persons are considered passive subjects of the corpse's violation.

=== Germany ===
In Germany, sexual contact with corpses may be regarded as Leichenschändung (Desecration of corpses), which is prosecutable as Störung der Totenruhe (Disturbance of the peace of the dead).

=== Pakistan ===
Until recently, Pakistan had no law that explicitly criminalised necrophilia. Offences involving abuses of dead bodies were prosecuted under general provisions such as Section 297 of the Pakistan Penal Code (PPC), which penalises trespass on burial sites and offering indignity to human corpses when accompanied by intent to wound religious feelings.

In September 2024, the Senate Standing Committee on the Interior unanimously approved the Pakistan Penal Code (Amendment) Bill, 2024—spearheaded by Senator Samina Mumtaz Zehri—which explicitly expanded the scope of Section 377 (unnatural offences) to include sexual acts involving a deceased body. The amendment now recognises necrophilia as a crime punishable by life imprisonment, aligning Pakistan's legal framework with Islamic principles regarding the sanctity of the dead.

=== India ===
According to a case in the Karnataka High Court titled "Rangaraju @Vajapeyi vs State of Karnataka," necrophilia can arise from feelings of anger, curiosity, or lust rather than being driven by sexual necessity or habit. In India, as of now, the Indian Penal Code (IPC) does not explicitly mention "necrophilia" as a distinct offense under the section that deals with sexual offenses. However, the court's interpretation suggested that it could potentially fall under Section 297, which pertains to causing "indignity to any human corpse" when someone trespasses into a place used for funeral rites or storing the remains of the deceased. Nevertheless, for an act to be considered an offense under Section 297, it must be accompanied by an intention to hurt someone's feelings or insult their religion. Additionally, if it is known that such an act is likely to hurt someone's feelings or insult their religion, it can be punishable under Section 297. In the specific case discussed by the court, it concluded that the elements required under Section 297 were not present. Therefore, the court stated that at most, it could be seen as sadism or necrophilia, but it did not qualify as an offense punishable under Section 376 of the Indian Penal Code. The court further recommended that the government amend the law accordingly.

=== Philippines ===
There are no laws that explicitly prohibit sexual acts on corpses. The closest applicable law is the provision in the Revised Penal Code which only criminalizes "defamation to blacken the memory of one who is dead". There were efforts to introduce bills criminalizing sexual acts on corpses during the 15th Congress; one by which penalizes sexual acts of males of corpses of women, and another covers sexual intercourse, anal sex, and oral sex done on corpses. Both proposals penalizes the act with fine and imprisonment.

=== New Zealand ===
Under Section 150 of New Zealand Crimes Act 1961, it is an offense for there to be "misconduct in respect to human remains". Subsection (b) elaborates that this applies if someone "improperly or indecently interferes with or offers indignity to any dead human body or human remains, whether buried or not". This statute is therefore applicable to sex with corpses and carries a potential two-year prison sentence, although there is no relevant case law.

=== South Africa ===
Section 14 of the Criminal Law (Sexual Offences and Related Matters) Amendment Act, 2007 prohibits the commission of a sexual act with a corpse. Until codified by the act it was a common law offence.

=== Sweden ===
Section 16, § 10 of the Swedish Penal Code criminalizes necrophilia, but it is not explicitly mentioned. Necrophilia falls under the regulations against abusing a corpse or grave (Brott mot griftefrid), which carries a maximum sentence of two years in prison. One person has been convicted of necrophilia. He was sentenced to psychiatric care for that and other crimes, including arson.

=== United Kingdom ===
Sexual penetration of a corpse was made illegal (in England and Wales) under the Sexual Offences Act 2003, carrying a maximum sentence of two years imprisonment. Before 2003, necrophilia was not illegal; however, exposing a naked corpse in public was classed as a public nuisance (R v. Clark [1883] 15 Cox 171).

Section 115 of the Crime and Policing Act 2026 amends the 2003 law, broadening the offence from requiring sexual penetration to also include sexual touching of a corpse. This change was in part due to the offences of David Fuller.

=== United States ===
Every state has its own law concerning the desecration or abuse of human remains.

| State | Severity | Statute |
|---|---|---|
| Alabama | Felony (Class C) | § 13A-11-13 |
| Alaska | Misdemeanor (Class A) | § 11-61-130 |
| Arizona | Felony (Class 4) | § 32-1364 |
| Arkansas | Felony (Class C) | § 5-60-101 |
| California | Felony | Health and Safety Code § 7052 |
| Colorado | Felony (Class 6) | § 18-13-101 |
| Connecticut | Misdemeanor (Class A) or Felony (Class D) if victim under 16 | § 53a-73a |
| Delaware | Misdemeanor (Class A) | § 11-5-1332 |
| Florida | Felony (second degree) | § 872.06 |
| Georgia | Felony | § 16-6-7 |
| Hawaii | Misdemeanor | § 711–1108 |
| Idaho | Misdemeanor | § 18-7027 |
| Illinois | Felony (Class 2) | § 720 ILCS 5/12-20.6 |
| Indiana | Felony (Level 6) | § 35-45-11-2 |
| Iowa | Felony (Class D) | § 709.18 |
| Kansas | Misdemeanor | § 21-6205 |
| Kentucky | Felony (Class D) | § 525.120 |
| Louisiana | Misdemeanor | § LA Rev Stat 14:101 |
| Maine | Felony (Class D) | § 17.508 |
| Maryland | Misdemeanor | § 10-401 |
| Massachusetts | N/A | N/A |
| Michigan | State jail felony (since 2024) | § 750.160 |
| Minnesota | Misdemeanor | § 609.294 |
| Mississippi | Felony | § 97-29-25 |
| Missouri | Felony (Class D) | § 194.425 |
| Montana | Felony | § 45-5-627 |
| Nebraska | Felony (Class 4) | § 28-1301 |
| Nevada | Felony (Class A) | NRS § 201.450 |
| New Hampshire | Misdemeanor | § 644:7 |
| New Jersey | Felony (Class 3) | § 2C:22-1 |
| New Mexico | N/A | N/A |
| New York | Misdemeanor (Class A) | § 130.20 |
| North Carolina | Felony (class I) | § 14-401.22(c) |
| North Dakota | Misdemeanor (Class A) | § 12.1-20-12 and § 12.1-20-02 |
| Ohio | Felony (fifth degree) | § 2927.01 |
| Oklahoma | Felony | § 21-1161 |
| Oregon | Felony | ORS § 166.085 |
| Pennsylvania | Misdemeanor (second degree) | 18 Pa. Cons. Stat. § 5510 |
| Rhode Island | Felony | § 11-20-1.2 |
| South Carolina | Felony | § 16-17-600 |
| South Dakota | N/A | N/A |
| Tennessee | Felony (Class E) | § 39-17-312 |
| Texas | State jail felony (since 2017) | § 9.42.08 |
| Utah | Felony (third degree) | § 76-9-704 |
| Vermont | State jail felony (since 2025) | 13 V.S.A. § 3761a |
| Virginia | N/A | N/A |
| Washington | Felony (Class C) | RCW § 9A.44.105 |
| West Virginia | Misdemeanor | § 61-8-9 |
| Wisconsin | Felony (Class G) | § 940.225 (7) |
| Wyoming | Felony | § 6-4-502 |

== Other animals ==
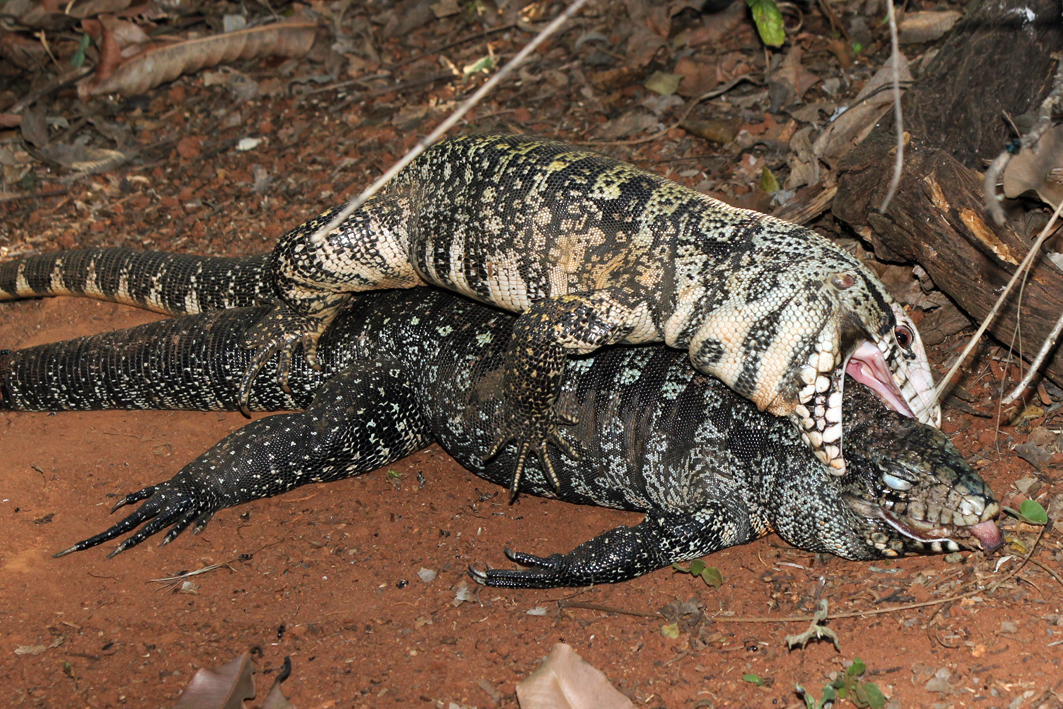
A male black and white tegu mounts a female that has been dead for two days and attempts to mate.

Necrophilia has been observed in mammals, birds, reptiles, and frogs. In 1960, Robert Dickerman described necrophilia in ground squirrels, which he termed "Davian behavior" after a limerick about a necrophiliac miner named Dave. The label is still used for necrophilia in animals.

Kees Moeliker observed while he was sitting in his office at the Natural History Museum Rotterdam when he heard the distinctive thud of a bird hitting the glass facade of the building. Upon inspection, he discovered a drake (male) mallard lying dead outside the building. Next to the downed bird, a second drake mallard was standing close by. As Moeliker observed the couple, the living drake pecked at the corpse of the dead one for a few minutes then mounted the corpse and began copulating with it. The act of necrophilia lasted for about 75 minutes, at which time, according to Moeliker, the living drake took two short breaks before resuming copulating behavior. Moeliker surmised that at the time of the collision with the window, the two mallards were engaged in a common pattern in duck behavior called "attempted rape flight". "When one died the other one just went for it and didn't get any negative feedback – well, didn't get any feedback," according to Moeliker. Necrophilia had previously only been reported in heterosexual mallard pairs.

In a short paper known as "Sexual Habits of the Adélie Penguin", deemed too shocking for contemporary publication, George Murray Levick described "little hooligan bands" of penguins mating with dead females in the Cape Adare rookery, the largest group of Adélie penguins, in 1911 and 1912. This is nowadays ascribed to lack of experience of young penguins; a dead female, with eyes half-closed, closely resembles a compliant female. A gentoo penguin was observed attempting to have intercourse with a dead penguin in 1921.

Necrophilia has been observed among bottlenose dolphins and manatees. A male New Zealand sea lion was once observed attempting to copulate with a dead female New Zealand fur seal in the wild. The sea lion nudged the seal repeatedly, then mounted her and made several pelvic thrusts. Approximately ten minutes later, the sea lion became disturbed by the researcher's presence, dragged the corpse of the seal into the water, and swam away while holding it. Necrophilia is documented in other pinniped species, such as the elephant seal, which is known to copulate with both dead adult seals and dead seal pups. A male sea otter was observed holding a female sea otter underwater until she drowned before repeatedly copulating with her carcass. Several months later, the same sea otter was again observed copulating with the carcass of a different female. Copulation with a dead female pilot whale by a captive male pilot whale has been observed, and possible sexual behavior between two male humpback whales, one dead, has also been reported.

Although necrophilia in non-human primates remains understudied, it was observed among wild stump-tailed macaques, when multiple males attempted to copulate with the corpse of a female macaque.

In 1983, a male rock dove was observed to be copulating with the corpse of a dove that shortly before had its head crushed by a car. In 2001, a researcher laid out sand martin corpses to attract flocks of other sand martins. In each of the six trials, 1–5 individuals from flocks of 50–500 were observed attempting to copulate with the dead sand martins. This occurred one to two months after the breeding season; since copulation outside the breeding season is uncommon among birds, the researcher speculated that the lack of resistance by the corpses stimulated the behavior. Charles Brown observed at least ten cliff swallows attempt to copulate with a road-killed cliff swallow in the space of 15 minutes. He commented, "This isn't the first time I've seen cliff swallows do this; the bright orange rump sticking up seems to be all the stimulus these birds need." Necrophilia has also been reported in the European swallow, grey-backed sparrow-lark, Stark's lark, and the snow goose. A Norwegian television report showed a male hybrid between a black grouse and western capercaillie kill a male black grouse before attempting to copulate with it. In 2015, due to work done by the University of Washington, it was found that crows would commit necrophilia on dead crow corpses in about 4% of encounters with corpses.

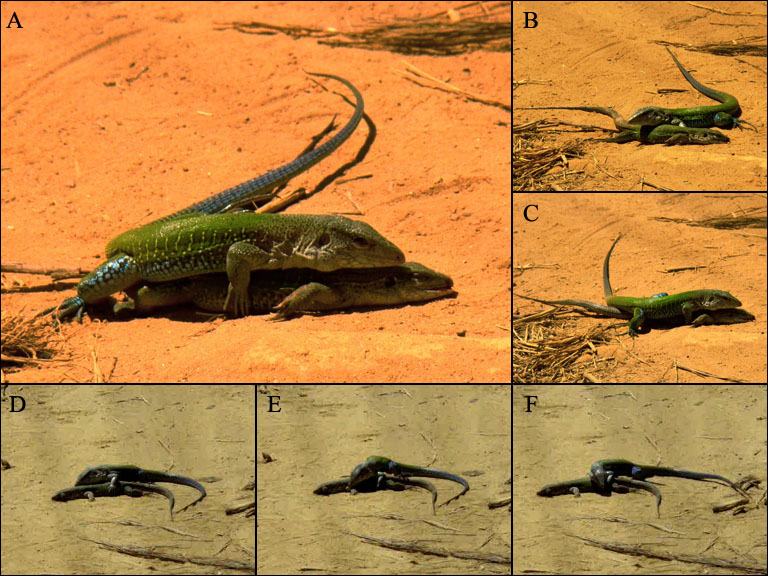
A male Ameiva ameiva mounts a dead female and attempts to pair cloacae.

Necrophilia has been documented in various lizard species, including Ameiva ameiva, the leopard lizard, and Holbrookia maculata. There are two reports of necrophilic behavior in the sleepy lizard (Tiliqua rugosa). In one, the partner of a male lizard got caught in a fencing wire and died. The male continued to display courtship behavior towards his partner two days after her death. This lizard's necrophilia was believed to stem from its strong monogamous bond. In one study of black and white tegu lizards, two different males were observed attempting to court and copulate with a single female corpse on two consecutive days. On the first day, the corpse was freshly dead, but by the second day, it was bloating and emitting a strong putrid odor. The researcher attributed the behavior to sex pheromones still acting on the carcass.

Male garter snakes often copulate with dead females. One case has been reported in the Bothrops jararaca snake with a dead South American rattlesnake. The prairie rattlesnake (Crotalus viridis) and Helicops carinicauda snake have both been seen attempting to mate with decapitated females, presumably attracted by still-active sex pheromones. Male crayfish sometimes copulate with dead crayfish of either sex, and in one observation with a dead crayfish of a different species.

In anurans, it has been observed in the foothill yellow-legged frog, the yellow fire-bellied toad, the common frog, the Oregon spotted frog, the common Asian Toad, Dendropsophus columbianus, and Rhinella jimi. The film Cane Toads: An Unnatural History shows a male toad copulating for eight hours with a female toad that had been run over by a car. Necrophilic amplexus in frogs may occur because males will mount any pliable object the size of an adult female. If the mounted object is a live frog not appropriate for mating, it will vibrate its body or vocalize a call to be released. Dead frogs cannot do this, so they may be held for hours.

=== Functional necrophilia ===
The Amazonian frog Rhinella proboscidea sometimes practices what has been termed "functional necrophilia": a male grasps the corpse of a dead female and squeezes it until its oocytes are ejected before fertilizing them.

Certain species of arachnids and insects practice sexual cannibalism, where the female cannibalizes her male mate before, during, or after copulation. The reproductive fitness among males of Trichonephila plumipes and other species has been found to directly benefit from necrophilia, with the female copulating far more effectively with the partially cannibalized corpse than it would with a still-living mate.

== See also ==
- Incidents of necrophilia
- Vulnerability and care theory of love
- Death during consensual sex
- List of paraphilias
  - Somnophilia
  - Agalmatophilia

== Footnotes ==
=== Sources ===
- Aggrawal, Anil (2010). Necrophilia: Forensic and Medico-legal Aspects. Boca Raton, Florida: CRC Press. ISBN 978-1-4200-8912-7.
- Aggrawal, Anil (19 April 2016). Necrophilia: Forensic and Medico-legal Aspects. CRC Press. ISBN 978-1-4200-8913-4.
- Finbow, Steve (2014). Grave Desire: A Cultural History of Necrophilia. Winchester, UK: Zero Books. ISBN 978-1-7827-9342-7.
- Lee Mellor (2016) Homicide: A Forensic Psychology Casebook. CRC Press. ISBN 9781498731522.
- Purcell, Catherine; Arrigo, Bruce A. (7 June 2006). The Psychology of Lust Murder: Paraphilia, Sexual Killing, and Serial Homicide. Elsevier. ISBN 978-0-08-046257-8.
- West, Sarah G.; Resnick, Phillip J. (2017). "Necrophilia". Unusual and Rare Psychological Disorders: A Handbook for Clinical Practice and Research. Oxford University Press. ISBN 978-0-19-024586-3.
