= São Pedro da Serra (Nova Friburgo) =

São Pedro da Serra is the 7th district of the municipality of Nova Friburgo in the state of Rio de Janeiro.

== Demography ==
In 2022, the population was estimated at 3 896 inhabitants according to the census conducted that year by the Brazilian Institute of Geography and Statistics (IBGE).

== Geography ==
The biome of Campo do Coelho is the Atlantic Forest.

== See also ==
- Nova Friburgo
- Lumiar
