= Lumiar (Nova Friburgo) =

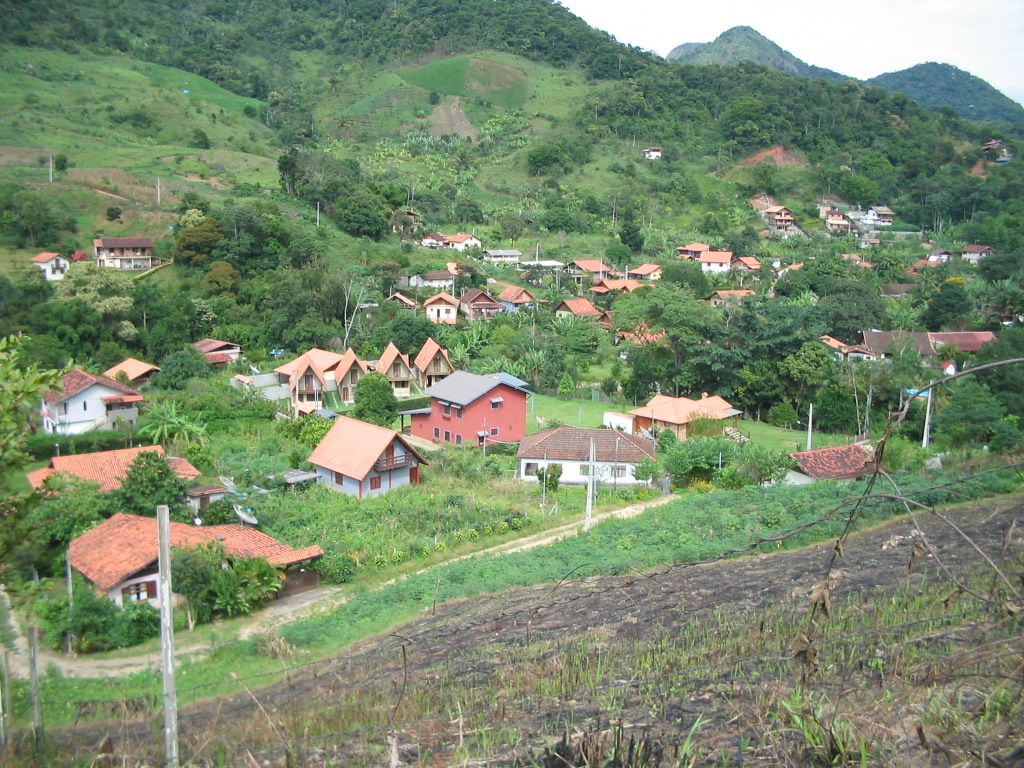
View of Lumiar

Lumiar is the 5th district of the municipality of Nova Friburgo in the state of Rio de Janeiro.

The district was celebrated in the song Lumiar, composed by Beto Guedes and Ronaldo Basto, which made it nationally known as a tourist destination.

== See also ==
- Nova Friburgo
- São Pedro da Serra
