= 2023 Afghanistan floods =

Afghan natural disaster

- Date: July 2023
- Duration: 3 days
- Location: Seven provinces of Afghanistan
- Cause: Heavy seasonal rain
- Deaths: At least 31
- Injuries: 74
- Missing: At least 41
- Property damage: A total of 606 residential houses were partially or completely damaged, and numerous acres of agricultural lands were affected by the floods.

In July 2023, Afghanistan experienced severe flooding resulting from heavy seasonal rainfall, leading to the loss of lives and dozens of missing persons over a three-day period. The flash floods were triggered by intense rains affecting seven provinces in the country, causing significant damage to residential houses and hundreds of acres of agricultural lands. The highest number of casualties occurred in the western Kabul and Maidan Wardak provinces.

Agricultural land encompassing hundreds of square miles was severely damaged and washed away by the floods. Additionally, the floods caused the closure of the highway connecting Kabul and the central Bamiyan province.

Shafiullah Rahimi, spokesman for the Afghanistan National Disaster Management Authority, stated that 74 people were injured and at least 41 remain missing. Personnel from various government entities, including the ministries of defense, public welfare, and the Red Crescent, as well as provincial and other officials, responded to the flood-affected areas to conduct rescue operations.

== See also ==
- Floods in Afghanistan
- 2013 Pakistan–Afghanistan floods
- 2014 Baghlan floods
- 2017 South Asian floods
- 2020 Afghanistan flood
- 2020 South Asian floods
- 2021 Nuristan floods
- 2021 South Asian floods
- 2022 Afghanistan floods
- 2024 Afghanistan-Pakistan floods
