= List of deadliest floods =

This is a list of the deadliest floods worldwide, with a minimum of 60 deaths.

== List ==
Deaths	Event	Location	Year
1,000,000–2,000,000	1887 Yellow River flood	China	1887
422,000–2,000,000	1931 China floods	China	1931
470,000–500,000	1938 Yellow River flood	China	1938
300,000–500,000	1970 Bhola cyclone	East Pakistan (present-day Bangladesh)	1970
145,000	1935 Yangtze flood	China	1935
100,000+	St. Felix's flood	Netherlands	1530
up to 100,000	The flood of 1099	Netherlands, England	1099
50,000–80,000	St. Lucia's flood, storm surge	Netherlands and Northern Germany	1287
0 or 36,000 or 60,000	North sea flood, storm surge	Holy Roman Empire	1212
40,000	1949 Eastern Guatemalan floods	Guatemala	1949
25,000+	First St. Marcellus's flood, storm surge	Holy Roman Empire	1219
33,000	1954 Yangtze floods	China	1954
27,000–1,500,000	1974 Bangladesh flood due to monsoon rain	Bangladesh	1974
26,000–240,000	1975 Banqiao Dam failure and floods	China	1975
25,000–40,000	St. Marcellus's flood (Grote Mandrenke), storm tide	Holy Roman Empire, Denmark	1362
20,000–25,000	All Saints' Flood, storm surge	Holy Roman Empire, Netherlands	1570
20,000	1939 Tianjin flood	China	1939
15,000	1705 Po Valley flood	Po Valley, Italy	1705
14,000	Christmas flood, storm surge	Netherlands, Germany, Denmark	1717
11,498+	Storm Daniel	Libya, Greece, Turkey, Bulgaria, Egypt	2023
10,000–100,000	St. Elizabeth's flood, storm surge	Holy Roman Empire	1421
10,000–30,000	1999 Vargas mudslide	Venezuela	1999
9,887–30,000	1999 Odisha cyclone, storm surge	India (Odisha), Myanmar, Bangladesh	1999
8,000–15,000	Burchardi flood	Germany, Denmark	1634
7,000	1557 Palermo flood	Sicily	1557
6,511	2020 South Asian floods	Afghanistan, India, Bangladesh, Nepal, Pakistan, Sri Lanka	2020
6,200	Sichuan, Hubei, Anhui flood	China	1980
6,054	2013 North India floods	India	2013
6,000-12,000	1900 Galveston hurricane	United States	1900
5,154 (official)	1963 Great Hai River flood	Hai River, China	1963
5,000–10,000	Rajasthan flood	India	1943
5,000	Lake Palcacocha in the Cojup valley, Cordillera Blanca mountain range, landslide by massive avalanche	Peru	1941
4,892	1968 Rajasthan, Gujarat monsoon rain	India	1968
4,800	1951 Manchuria flood	China	1951
4,000	1610 Tanaro River flood	Italy	1610
3,838	1998 Eastern India, 1998 Bangladesh flood	India, Bangladesh	1998
3,814	1989 Sichuan flood	China	1989
3,800	1978 Northern India monsoon rain	India	1978
3,656	1998 Yangtze river flood	China	1998
3,500	1948 Fuzhou flood	China	1948
3,189+	2010 China floods, landslides	China, North Korea	2010
3,083	1993 South Asian monsoon floods	Nepal, India, Bangladesh, Pakistan	1993
5,951+ (confirmed)	Storm Daniel	Greece, Libya, Bulgaria, Turkey, Egypt, Syria, Israel	2023
3,076	2004 Eastern India, Bangladesh monsoon rain	India, Bangladesh	2004
3,000	1530 Tiber River flood	Italy	1530
3,000	1598 Tiber River flood	Italy	1598
3,000	1992 Afghanistan flood, mainly, Gulbahar, Kalotak, Shutul, Parwan, flash flood, mudslide	Afghanistan	1992
2,910	1950 Pakistan flood	Pakistan	1950
2,828+	2011 Southeast Asian floods	Philippines, Thailand, Cambodia, Myanmar, Vietnam, Laos, Malaysia	2011
2,775	1996 China flood, torrential floods, mud-rock flows	China	1996
2,566	1953 Japan floods (1953 Northern Kyushu flood and 1953 Wakayama flood), massive rain, flood, mudslides	mainly Kitakyushu, Kumamoto, Wakayama, and Kizugawa, Japan	1953
2,400	North Sea flood, storm surge	Netherlands	838
2,379	1988 Bangladesh monsoon rain	Bangladesh	1988
2,209	Johnstown Flood	United States (Pennsylvania)	1889
2,142	North Sea flood of 1953 storm surge	Netherlands, United Kingdom, Belgium	1953
2,075	1981 Sichuan, Shanxi flood	China	1981
2,055	1987 Bangladesh monsoon rain	Bangladesh	1987
several thousands	North Sea flood, storm surge	Holy Roman Empire	1014
several thousands	St. Juliana flood, storm surge	Holy Roman Empire	1164
several thousands	St. Agatha flood, storm surge	Holy Roman Empire	1288
several thousands	St. Clemens flood, storm surge	Holy Roman Empire	1334
several thousands	St. Mary Magdalene's flood	Central Europe	1342
several thousands	All Saints flood, storm surge	Holy Roman Empire	1532
several thousands	North Sea flood, storm surge	Netherlands	1703
2,000–10,000	Great Iran Flood	Iran	1954
2,000–5,000^{1}	1979 Machchhu dam failure	India (Morvi, Gujarat)	1979
2,000–3,000	Mostaganem and Oran flood	Algeria	1927
2,000+	Bristol Channel floods	England and Wales; possible tsunami	1607
2,000+	May 2004 Caribbean floods	Haiti, Dominican Republic, Puerto Rico, Jamaica, Cuba, Bahamas, Turks and Caicos Islands	2004
1,985	2010 Pakistan floods, monsoon flooding	Pakistan	2010
1,921	Vajont Dam landslide and flood	Italy	1963
1,834	1992 Pakistan, Northern India monsoon rain	Pakistan, India	1992
1,739	2022 Pakistan floods	Pakistan	2022
1,723	1991 China flood, mainly, Sichuan, Guizhou, Hubei, torrential floods, mud-rock flows	China	1991
1,700	1955 Northern India flood	India	1955
1,624	Fujian, Anhui, Zhejiang flood	China	2005
1,605–3,363	spring flooding	Haiti, Dominican Republic	2004
1,558	St. Martin flood, storm surge	Netherlands	1686
1,532	2002 China flood, torrential floods, mud-rock flows	China	2002
1,503	Mumbai and the surrounding state Maharashtra, Karnataka, monsoon rain in 2005	India	2005
1,494+	2026 Nepal–Tibet floods	Nepal, Tibet	2026
1,437	1995 China flood, mainly, Hunan, Jiangxi, Liaoning, Sichuan, Fujian, torrential rain, devastating floods, mud-rock flows	China	1995
1,392	Hurricane Katrina, storm surge and levee failure	United States	2005
1,348	2007 China flood, mountain torrents, mud-rock flows	China	2007
1,268	Floods caused by Tropical Storm Washi	Philippines	2011
1,201+	2025 Sumatra floods and landslides	Indonesia	2025
1,029	2004 China flood, mountain torrents, mud-rock flows, landslide	China	2004
1,000–8,000	2016 Indian floods by monsoon rain	India	2016
1,000	1961 Bihar flood	India	1961
992	1957 Isahaya flood, massive rain and mudslide	Japan	1957
941	Inuyama Iruka pond dam failure	Japan	1868
933	1938 Hanshin flood, mainly Tokyo, Kobe, massive rain and landslide	Japan	1938
915	Barcelona, flash flood	Spain	1962
903	January 2011 Rio de Janeiro floods and mudslides	Brazil	2011
848	1977 Karachi flood	Pakistan	1977
844	2006 North Korean floods	North Korea	2006
827	Algiers, Bab El Oued, devastating flood, mudslide	Algeria	2001
800	North Sea flood, storm surge	Netherlands	1825
800	2000 Mozambique flood	Mozambique	2000
705	2006 Ethiopia flood, mainly Omo River Delta, Dire Dawa, Tena, and Gode, flash floods, heavy rain	Ethiopia	2006
677	August 8 2009 flood due to Typhoon Morakot; an entire village of Shiaolin was buried in the southern county of Kaohsiung	Taiwan	2009
672	1972 Seoul flood	South Korea	1972
653	1972 Luzon flood	Philippines	1972
650	Great Flood of 1913	United States	1913
647	Cyclone Ditwah	Sri Lanka and India	2025
610	2007 North Korean floods	North Korea	2007
595	1999 Vietnamese floods	Vietnam	1999
594	Hanoi and Red River Delta flood	North Vietnam	1971
540	1969 Tunisia flooding	Tunisia	1969
532	Cuzco, Huallaga, torrential rain, flooding, landslide	Peru	1982
517	1967 Massive rain of Japan, mainly, Kobe, Kure, Agano River, massive rain and landslide	Japan	1967
506	KwaZulu-Natal	South Africa	1987
500	Malawi, flash flood and landslide	Malawi	1991
500	2018 East Africa floods	Kenya, Ethiopia, Uganda, Rwanda, and Somalia	2018
483	2018 Kerala floods	India	2018
464	Lisbon flash flood	Portugal	1967
449+	2016 China floods	China	2016
445	Western Japan, massive rains and landslides	Japan	1972
437	1967 Brazil flood, mainly Rio de Janeiro, São Paulo, flood and landslide	Brazil	1967
431	St. Francis Dam failure	United States (California)	1928
431	2015 Tamil Nadu floods Chennai, Cuddalore and Andhra Pradesh named 2015 South Indian floods	India	2015
429	2002 Nepal flood, mainly occurred at Makwanpur, monsoon rain, flood, landslide	Nepal	2002
425	October 1999 Mexico floods, mainly occurred at Tabasco, Puebla, Chiapas, flood and mudslide as a result from Tropical Depression Eleven	Mexico	1999
421	Malpasset Dam failure	France	1959
420	St. Aaron's Flood	Amsterdam	1420
415+	2024 Nigeria floods	Nigeria	2024
408	1969 South Korea flood, mainly, Gyeongsangbuk-do, Gyeongsangnam-do, Gangwon-do, torrential rain, landslide	South Korea	1969
407	1993 Iran flood, mainly occurred at Isfahan, Bandar Abbas, flash flood and landslide	Iran	1993
405	1998 South Korea flood, heavy massive rain, landslide	South Korea	1998
400	1955 Lebanon Tripoli flood	Lebanon	1955
386	Thailand, Malaysia, mainly Nakhon, Songkhla, and Kelantan, torrential rain	Thailand, Malaysia	1988
385+	Wayanad, Kerala, India	Chooral Mala Landslide	2024
385	Ohio River flood of 1937	United States (Pennsylvania, Ohio, West Virginia, Kentucky, Indiana, Illinois)	1937
373	1966 Rio de Janeiro flood, flood and landslide	Brazil	1966
364	Piura, Tumbes, torrential rain, flooding, landslide	Peru	1983
360+	Great Dayton Flood	United States	1913
360	1958 Buenos Aires flood	Argentina	1958
356+	1923 Gleno Dam failure	Italy	1923
353	2007 African Nations flood	mainly Sudan, Nigeria, Burkina Faso, Ghana, Kenya, and other African countries	2007
347	1996 Yemen flood	Yemen	1996
345	1987 South Korea flood, mainly, Chungchongnam-do, Jeollanam-do, Kangwon, torrential rain, landslide	South Korea	1987
342	2006 East African Flood	Kenya, Ethiopia, Somalia	2006
315	North Sea flood of 1962 storm tide	Germany	1962
313	2003 Sumatra flood, mainly Jambi, Batanghari, Tondano, torrential rain, flash flood, landslide	Indonesia	2003
302	2021 Henan floods	China	2021
300+	2024 Nepal floods	Nepal	2024
300	1584 Tanaro River flood	Italy	1584
300	1878 flood in Miskolc	Miskolc, Hungary	1878
299	1982 Nagasaki flood	Japan	1982
290	Rio de Janeiro and Fluminense flood	Brazil	1988
272	1973 Granada, Almeria, Murcia flood	Spain	1973
270	Great Sheffield flood dam disaster	United Kingdom	1864
268	Val di Stava dam disaster	Italy	1985
259	1966 Maian flood	Jordan	1966
255	1998 Tajikistan flood	Tajikistan	1998
251	2021 Maharashtra floods	India	2021
250	La Josefina landslide dam failure	Ecuador	1993
246+	April 2010 Rio de Janeiro floods and mudslides	Rio de Janeiro, Brazil	2010
246	Great Mississippi Flood of 1927	United States (Arkansas, Illinois, Kentucky, Louisiana, Mississippi, Missouri, Tennessee, Texas, Oklahoma, Kansas)	1927
243	2021 European floods	Austria, Belgium, Germany, Italy, Luxembourg, Netherlands, Switzerland, United Kingdom, Romania, Czech Republic, Croatia	2021
242-247	2024 Spanish floods	Valencia, Castilla La Mancha, Andalusia, Balearic Islands, Catalonia and Murcia, Spain	2024
240	2017 Gujarat flood	Gujarat and Rajasthan, India	2017
238	Black Hills flood	United States	1972
235–244	2009 Philippine Floods	Philippines	2009
233	2020 Central Vietnam floods	Vietnam, Cambodia, Laos	2020
232	2002 European floods	Czech Republic, Germany, Austria, Slovakia, Hungary, Romania, Bulgaria, Russia, Ukraine	2002
230	Marrakesh flash flood	Morocco	1995
228	2007 Balochistan flood by Cyclone Yemyin	Pakistan	2007
225	2018 Japan floods	Japan	2018
223	2012 North Korean floods	North Korea	2012
203+	2017 China floods	China	2017
200–600	1824 St. Petersburg flood	Russia	1824
200–600	Chungar landslide, flood, avalanche	Peru	1971
200+	2008 South China floods	South China	2008
200	Pamir Mountain area, mud and rock slides, torrential rain	Tajikistan	1992
199	Santa Catarina, Tubarão, torrential heavy rain	Brazil	1974
199	2009 El Salvador floods and mudslides	El Salvador	2009
190	Huigra, landslide	Ecuador	1931
187	Ulaanbaatar-Tov area, heavy rain, mostly during August	Mongolia	1982
182	2024 Rio Grande do Sul floods	Brazil	2024
172	2012 Russian floods	Krymsk	2012
165	2004 Brazil flood, mainly São Paulo, Pemambuco, torrential rain, mudslide	Brazil	2004
159	Sarno flood and landslide	Italy	1998
154	KwaZulu-Natal	South Africa	1995
141+	2010–2011 Southern Africa floods	Africa	2011
140+	2019 Pakistan floods and storms	Pakistan	2019
139	Mill River (Northampton, Massachusetts)	United States	1874
138	2010 Colombia floods	Colombia	2010
136+	July 2025 Central Texas floods	United States	2025
133-196	1957 Ankara flood	Turkey	1957
128	Izumo, massive rain and mudslide	Japan	1964
125+	2010 Leh floods	Jammu and Kashmir, Pakistan/India	2010
123	2009 Jeddah torrential rain, floods	Saudi Arabia	2009
121	1986 Northern Vietnam floods	Vietnam	1986
120	1991 Antofagasta flood, mudslide	Chile	1991
119	2007 Central and East Java torrential monsoon rain, landslide, flood	Indonesia	2007
117	Masuda, massive rain and landslide	Japan	1983
115	Los Angeles flood of 1938	United States	1938
114	1990 South Korea flood, Seoul, Inchon, heavy rain	South Korea	1990
114	1997 Central European flood	Poland, Czech Republic	1997
113	2019 Jayapura flood and landslide	Indonesia	2019
113	2021 Afghanistan flood, 2021 Nuristan floods	Afghanistan	2021
110	Southern Federal District, heavy rain, landslide	Russia	2002
104	1981 Laingsburg flood	South Africa	1981
101	2013 Argentina floods	Argentina	2013
101	2016 Sri Lankan floods	Sri Lanka	2016
100+	2023 North India floods	India	2023
100	2008 Vietnam floods	Vietnam, China	2008
94	The Mameyes disaster	Ponce, Puerto Rico	1985
86	"Las Nieves" camping river flood, in Biescas.	Spain	1996
85+	January 2010 Rio de Janeiro floods and mudslides	Rio de Janeiro, Brazil	2010
81+	Valencia flood	Valencia, Spain	1957
81	Holmfirth floods—Bilberry Reservoir dam failure	United Kingdom	1852
81	2021 Turkey floods	Turkey	2021
80–100	1852 Gundagai flood	Australia	1852
80+	2014 Southeast Europe floods	Serbia, Bosnia and Herzegovina, Croatia	2014
80	1988 Sudan floods	Sudan	1988
80	1977 Johnstown flood	Johnstown, Pennsylvania, US	1977
78	Austin Dam failure	United States	1911
77+	2019 Iran floods	Iran	2019
77	2021 Niger floods	Niger	2021
73	1993 Kagoshima flood, mudslides and debris flow	Japan	1993
72+	2012 Nigeria floods	Nigeria	2012
72	Gudbrandsdalen flood and landslides	Norway	1789
68	2019 South Sulawesi floods	Indonesia	2019
67	2003 Santa Fe flood	Argentina	2003
66	2020 Jakarta floods	Indonesia	2020
61	Clermont and Peak Downs flood	Australia	1916

== Notes ==
1.Some reports list as many as 12,000 dead.

== See also ==
- List of floods
- List of flash floods
- List of natural disasters by death toll
