= Floods in Afghanistan =

Floods in Afghanistan start in March and continue until May. Out of 34 provinces in Afghanistan, 21 are vulnerable to floods. The western region and central belt are at the highest risk. However, the southwest and a few northern provinces (Hirat, Ghor, Urozgan, Jozjan, Balkh, and Faryab) can be severely affected by both flooding and drought.

Many Afghan provinces are affected by multiple hazards, and lie under the Multi Hazard High Risk Zone. Earthquakes and landslides are of concern in the northern regions. Being mountainous, these areas have poor accessibility due to geographical conditions and harsh weather that further increase the vulnerability of populations living in these areas. Also, the remote central region of Afghanistan experiences recurrent floods and droughts. The southern region is primarily drought-prone.

Although as of 2016, no precise records existed in Afghanistan, it has been assumed that drowning, fatal injuries, venomous snakebites, electrocutions, and contamination by toxic materials occur at much greater than reported rates.

Sudden massive flooding caused by rivers overflowing, glacial lake outbursts, or the collapse of dams can cause many deaths due to drowning and related traumatic injuries. Massive flooding affects the community as to education, water and sanitation, agriculture, general health, and social life, which in general will lead to a decline of the community. There is a need to focus on early warning, early recovery and community empowerment.

== List ==
- 2013 Pakistan–Afghanistan floods
- 2014 Baghlan floods
- 2017 South Asian floods
- 2020 Afghanistan flood
- 2020 South Asian floods
- 2021 Nuristan floods
- 2021 South Asian floods
- 2022 Afghanistan floods
- 2023 Afghanistan flood
- 2024 Afghanistan–Pakistan floods

== See also ==
- 2026 in Afghanistan (the Nuristan flood in July)
