= 2022 Pakistan floods =

Disaster in Pakistan

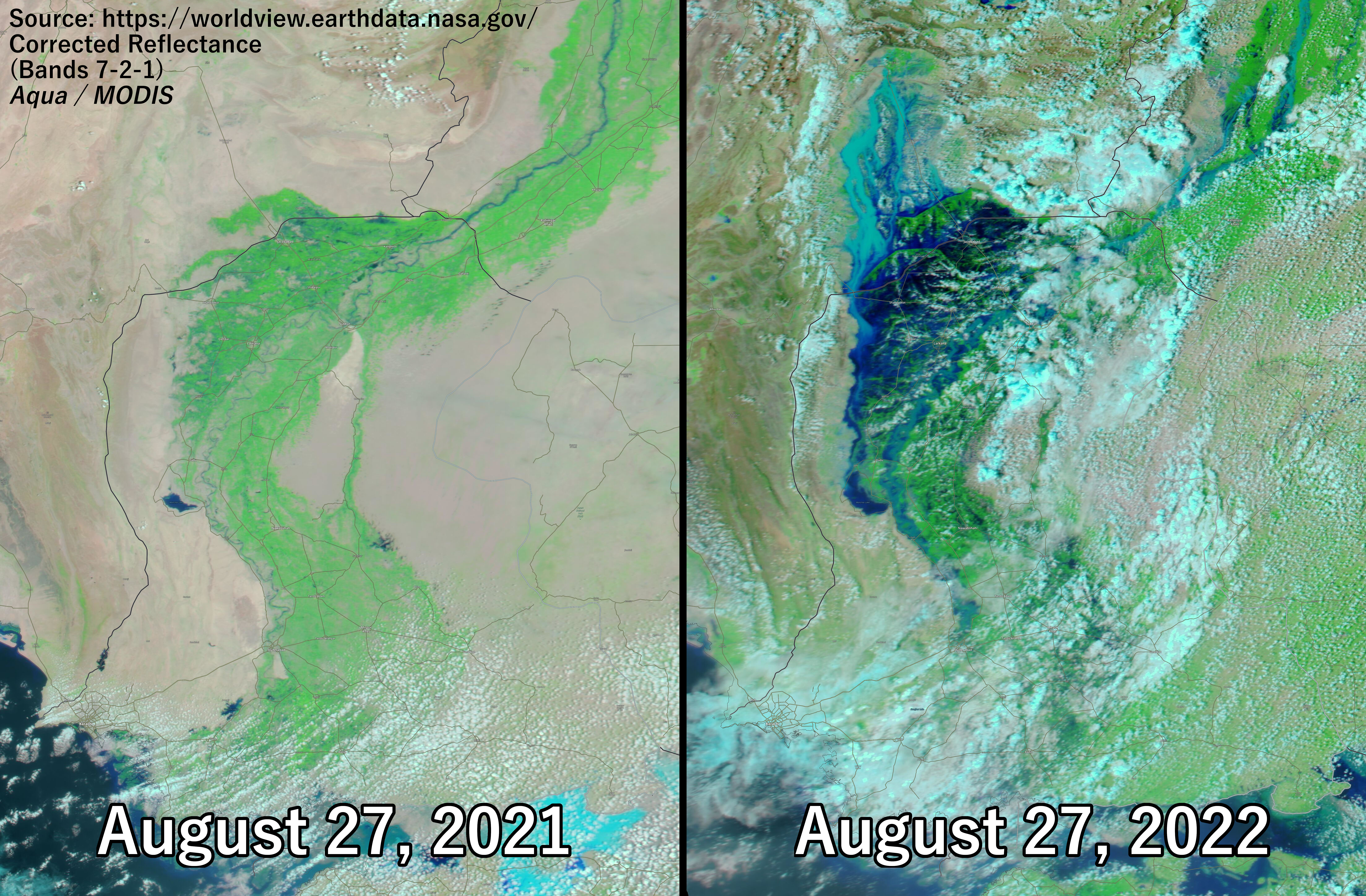
- Satellite imagery showing a side-by-side comparison of southern Pakistan on 27 August 2021 (one year before the floods) and 27 August 2022
- Date: 14 June 2022 – October 2022
- Location: Balochistan, Sindh, Khyber Pakhtunkhwa, Gilgit-Baltistan, Azad Kashmir and southern parts of Punjab
- Cause: Heavy monsoon rains, poor urban planning, climate change
- Deaths: 1,760
- Injuries: 12,867
- Property damage: $40 billion (2022 USD)

From 15 June to October 2022, floods in Pakistan killed 1,739 people, and caused about US$40 billion in damage. The immediate causes of the floods were heavier than usual monsoon rains and melting glaciers that followed a severe heat wave, both of which are linked to climate change.

On 25 August 2022, Pakistan declared a state of emergency because of the flooding.

The flooding was the world's deadliest flood since the 2020 South Asian floods and described as the worst in the country's history. It was also recorded as one of the costliest natural disasters in world history.

== Background ==
The minister of climate change of Pakistan, Sherry Rehman, said that the provinces of Sindh and Balochistan had received more rainfall than the August average, with 784% and 500% more, respectively. Higher than average monsoon rains were also recorded in India and Bangladesh. The Indian Ocean is one of the fastest warming oceans in the world, warming by an average of 1 °C (1.8 °F) (while worldwide temperatures are now at 1.2 °C (2.2 °F) above pre-industrial temperatures, oceans in general are at around 0.7 °C (1.3 °F)). The rise in sea surface temperatures is believed to increase monsoon rainfall. In addition, southern Pakistan experienced back-to-back heat waves in May and June, which were record-setting and themselves made more likely by climate change. These created a strong thermal low that brought heavier rains than usual. The heatwaves also triggered glacial flooding in Gilgit-Baltistan.

Pakistan contributes less than 1% of global greenhouse gas emissions, but is one of the places most vulnerable to climate change. A study by an international team of climate scientists says that global heating made the flooding up to 50% worse and future floods more likely. However, some of the contributors to the severity of the flooding are local to the country. Unregulated construction and deforestation in Pakistan are factors that have worsened the floods.

== Impact ==
Overview of rainfall accumulation and flooding

1,739 people died, including 647 children, and an additional 12,867 were injured. Over 2.1 million people were left homeless because of the floods. These are the deadliest floods in Pakistan since 2010, when nearly 2,000 died in flooding, and the deadliest in the world since the 2020 South Asian floods. On 29 August, Sherry Rehman, the minister of climate change, claimed that "one-third" of the country was underwater, and there was "no dry land to pump the water out", adding that it was a "crisis of unimaginable proportions". Her claim received widespread media coverage. In contrast, the UNOSAT United Nations Satellite Centre reported that 75,000km2 had been flooded (around 9% of Pakistan) with USAID stating a maximum floodwater extent of 32,800 square miles (around 10% of Pakistan). A BBC report estimated that around 10–12% of Pakistan was flooded; the total area of standing floodwaters peaked between July and August at approximately 32,800 square miles (84,952 km^{2}). Agricultural fields were also devastated by the flooding.

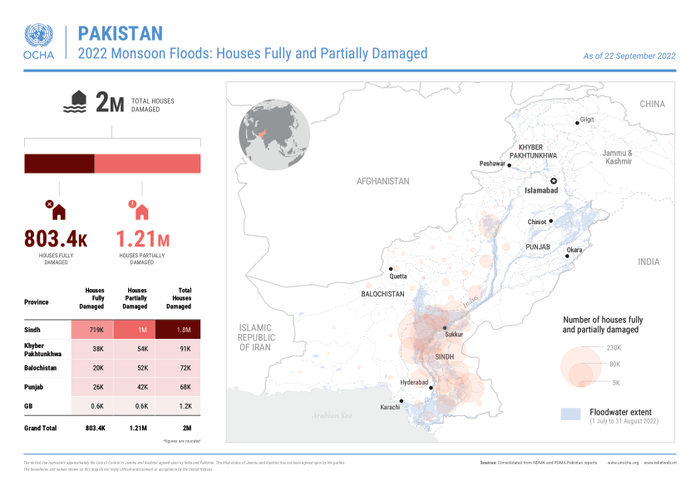
Damaged houses per district

The floods affected 33 million people in Pakistan and destroyed 897,014 houses and damaged another 1,391,467. 1,164,270 livestock have been killed, most of them in the province of Balochistan, while destruction to 13,115 kilometres (8,149 mi) of roads and 439 bridges has impeded access across flood-affected areas. Over 22,000 schools were damaged or destroyed.

The Ministry of Finance estimated the damage of the flooding was ₨3.91 trillion (US$14.9 billion), and the economic loss was ₨3.99 trillion (US$15.2 billion). The government required ₨4.26 trillion (US$16.3 billion) to recover from the flooding. The United Nations Development Programme (UNDP) and the International Labour Organization (ILO) also concurred with the damage and the economic loss assessed by the government of Pakistan. However, another assessment done by the World Bank and the Pakistan Climate Change Council claimed that the damage of the flooding stood at US$40 billion.

As a result of the devastating superfloods in these areas, nearly 8 million displaced as their houses and properties were wiped away by the monsoon rains, floods and landslides in 2022. In this displacement, a sizable population of women was affected and were compelled to seek refuge and live in camps made of plastic tents exposed to the risk of gender based Violence (GBV). A reported number of 650,000 pregnant women was affected in these far-flung rural areas with already scarce resources for healthcare. The data shows a striking number of 73, 000 full term pregnant women, who were expected to give birth within a month living in an environment highly conducive of gastric and waterborne diseases posing threat to their situation. Due to the floods more than 1,500 healthcare facilities were partially or completely destroyed. Many of these women gave birth in the make-shift temporary health camps where administering operations and securing vaccines for the newly born children was a challenge for the health workers.

Aid workers warned that lack of clean drinking water caused an increase in waterborne diseases, namely diarrhea, cholera, dengue, and malaria. Skin infections caused by wet conditions have also been widely reported.

=== Sindh ===
Floods in Sindh killed 799 people and injured 8,422. Among the 338 children killed were three who died when the roof of their house collapsed in Kandhkot. 10 million people were displaced in Sindh and 57,496 houses were severely damaged or completely destroyed, mostly in the Hyderabad Division, and 830 cattle were killed. 6,200 km^{2} (1,540,000 acres) of farmland was impacted by the floods.

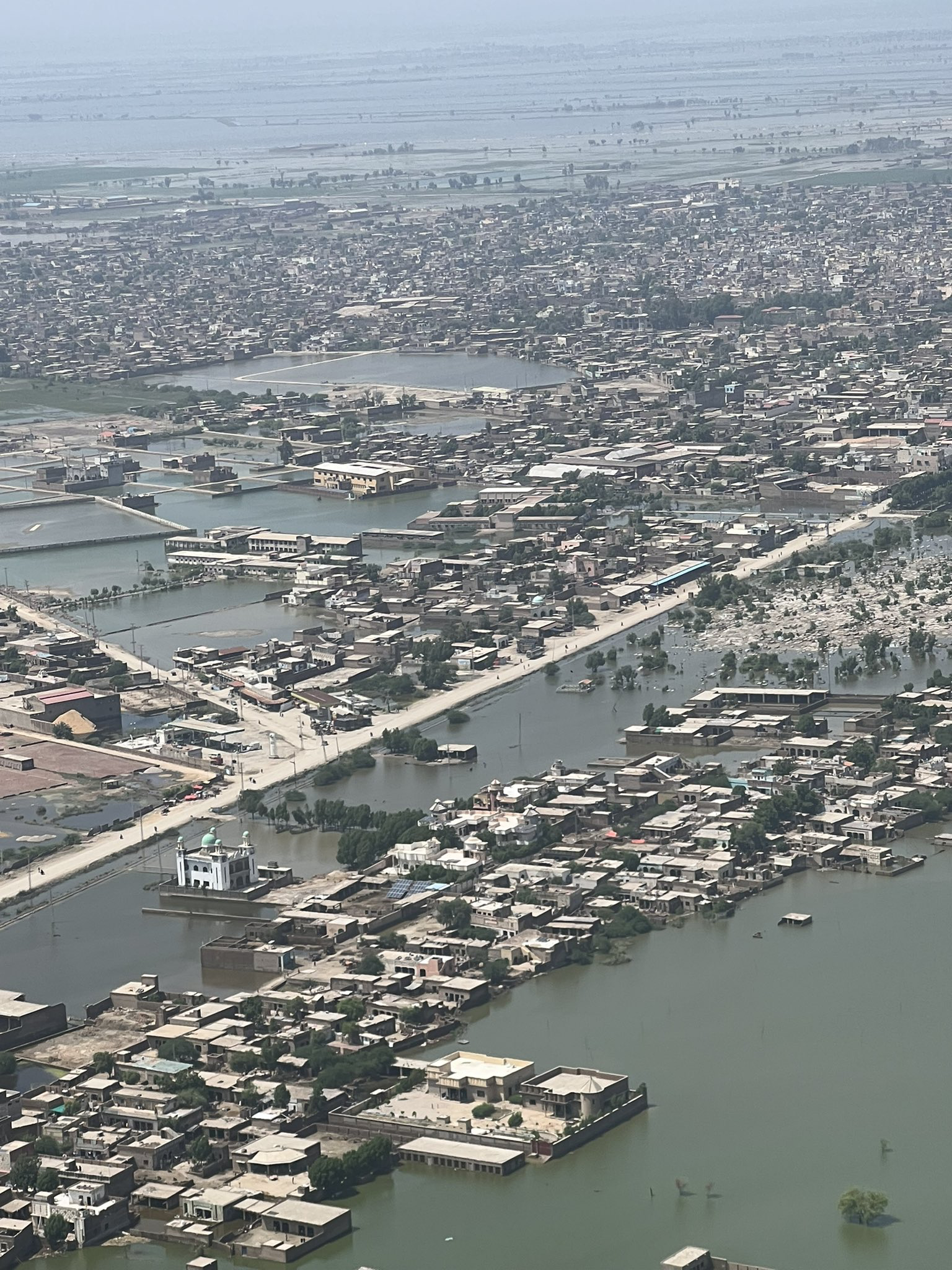
An aerial view of Shahdadkot city covered with floodwater in September 2022.

The Larkana and Sukkur divisions were severely affected by the floods; Thari Mirwah and Khairpur Nathan Shah were "inundated". The floods turned the Indus River into a lake 100 km (62 mi) wide. The towns of Johi and Mehar were saved by their residents making ring bands around their towns.

In Jacobabad, which has been called the world's hottest city, more than 40,000 people were living in temporary shelters with limited access to food, with 19 dead from the flooding as of 31 August.

During the floods, Lake Manchar overflowed, and in September 2022 efforts were made to assist its drainage.

In the Dadu District, floodwater reportedly submerged 300 villages.

The Sindh provincial government confirmed, on 16 September 2022, 588 cases of malaria, with a further 10,604 suspected cases, as well as 17,977 cases of diarrhea, and 20,064 of skin disease. Since 1 July, a total of 2,300,000 patients have been treated for malaria in field and mobile hospitals. A high of 90,000 cases of diarrhea were reported in a single day on 1 September.

=== Balochistan ===
Flooding in Balochistan killed 336 people. In many areas, rainwater infiltrated many homes and made them uninhabitable. Many families were displaced. 426,897 houses were either damaged or completely destroyed, and 1,230 km^{2} (304,000 acres) of crops were lost. An estimated half-million livestock were also killed.

According to the Relief Commissioner Provincial Disaster Management Authority, Balochistan's capital Quetta was declared a disaster area due to rains, and an emergency was declared in the province. Many organisations took part in relief, including Balochistan Youth Action Committee & Apna Dastarkhwan (Zariya Social Welfare Foundation).

=== Khyber Pakhtunkhwa ===
309 people died and 600,000 others were displaced by floods in the province. Among them were five children in Upper Dir District; they had been returning home from school when they were swept away by the floods and drowned. 326,897 houses were damaged due to floods and landslides, and 7,742 cattle died from collapsing sheds. In Swat District, a newly built hotel collapsed due to excessive flooding. The southwestern part of the province was previously affected by the June 2022 Afghanistan earthquake.

In Lower Kohistan District, 5 people stranded in a hill torrent were swept away; 4 of them were killed, while one was rescued. In Balakot, 8 nomads were killed due to flooding in a tributary of the Kunhar River. 12 people were also killed in flooding in different areas of Dera Ismail Khan due to flash floods from hill torrents.

=== Gilgit-Baltistan ===
23 people died, four were missing, and floods badly affected the Karakoram Highway. Roads were closed for traffic at several places due to landslides. The districts of Ghizer, Nagar, Diamer, Ghanche, and Astore were the worst affected. 420 homes were destroyed and 740 were damaged due to floods and landslides. Meanwhile, the S-1 Strategic Highway also suffered erosion due to high water flows in the Indus River. The Ishkoman Valley Road was cut off at Gutkash due to flooding in the Ishkoman River. A bridge at Chhorbat in Ghanche District was also flooded. Valley roads and two bridges in Nagar District were swept away by floods. There were also reports of damage in Khanar and Bonar in Diamer District. As of 26 August, most parts of the villages in Ghizer were destroyed by the flood. Among these were Buber Valley, Gahkuch, and Gulmuti. Residents were asked to evacuate the flood-affected areas as river levels rose to an extremely dangerous height.

=== Punjab ===
In Punjab, 223 people died and 3,858 others suffered injuries. In Taunsa, many settlements were submerged in floodwater. In the historical town of Mangadotha, west of Taunsa, hundreds of houses and livestock were swept away by flood waters. 7,200 km^{2} (1,780,000 acres) of crops and orchids were also impacted. Residents of communities adjacent to flooded rivers began to evacuate, with most families moving away. Most of the families have moved to safer places on foot and camels while carrying only essential supplies as roads and bridges were washed away.

=== Azad Kashmir ===
48 people died by flooding in Azad Kashmir. On 31 July, in Poonch District, ten people died and four were injured when a roof collapsed on top of them. Five tourists from Mianwali were swept away and later confirmed to have been killed in Neelum Valley on 19 August.

== Response ==
=== National ===
The prime minister, Shehbaz Sharif, who had decided to spearhead the relief operations in the wake of massive floods, met international partners on 25 August who pledged to provide $500 million to the country to mitigate the havoc wreaked by flooding.

Army officers, federal cabinet members, and senators will donate their one-month salary for the flood relief fund. PTCL Group, Pakistan's largest telecom and internet services provider, announced ₨. 1.75 billion(or US$8 million) to support flood relief efforts and those affected by the floods.

The chairman of the Pakistan Tehreek-e-Insaf (PTI) party and former prime minister, Imran Khan, held a 3-hour-long telethon to raise funds for flood victims and received ₨. 500 crores (or US$22.5 million) in pledges for flood relief.

On 30 August, the Government of Pakistan announced $170 million allocation to flood victims, which will be disbursed through the Benazir Income Support Programme (BISP) as part of Pakistan Flood Response Plan 2022. The Pakistani embassies in China and Turkey have also set up fundraisers requesting flood relief donations from locals.

Pakistan Telecommunication Authority (PTA) introduced the 9999 SMS code for flood relief donations to enable consumers to donate their funds through mobile phone text to support the flood victims. The consumers would be required to write "fund" and send it to the 9999 short code to donate ₨. 10 (or US ¢4.5) to contribute to the prime minister's floods relief fund.

The government has been accused of inaction on relief and rescue operations, with local officials allegedly hoarding humanitarian aid. Incidents of looting due to lack of aid have emerged, with several NGOs halting relief operations after their trucks carrying relief goods were looted. In Sukkur, police booked 100 flood-affected persons under terrorism charges for protesting against the lack of food and relief when Shehbaz Sharif and foreign minister Bilawal Bhutto visited to assess flood damage on 26 August.

Mehraz provided free low-cost housing designs made of bamboo for affected communities, focusing on environmentally friendly and resilient construction techniques and flood management.

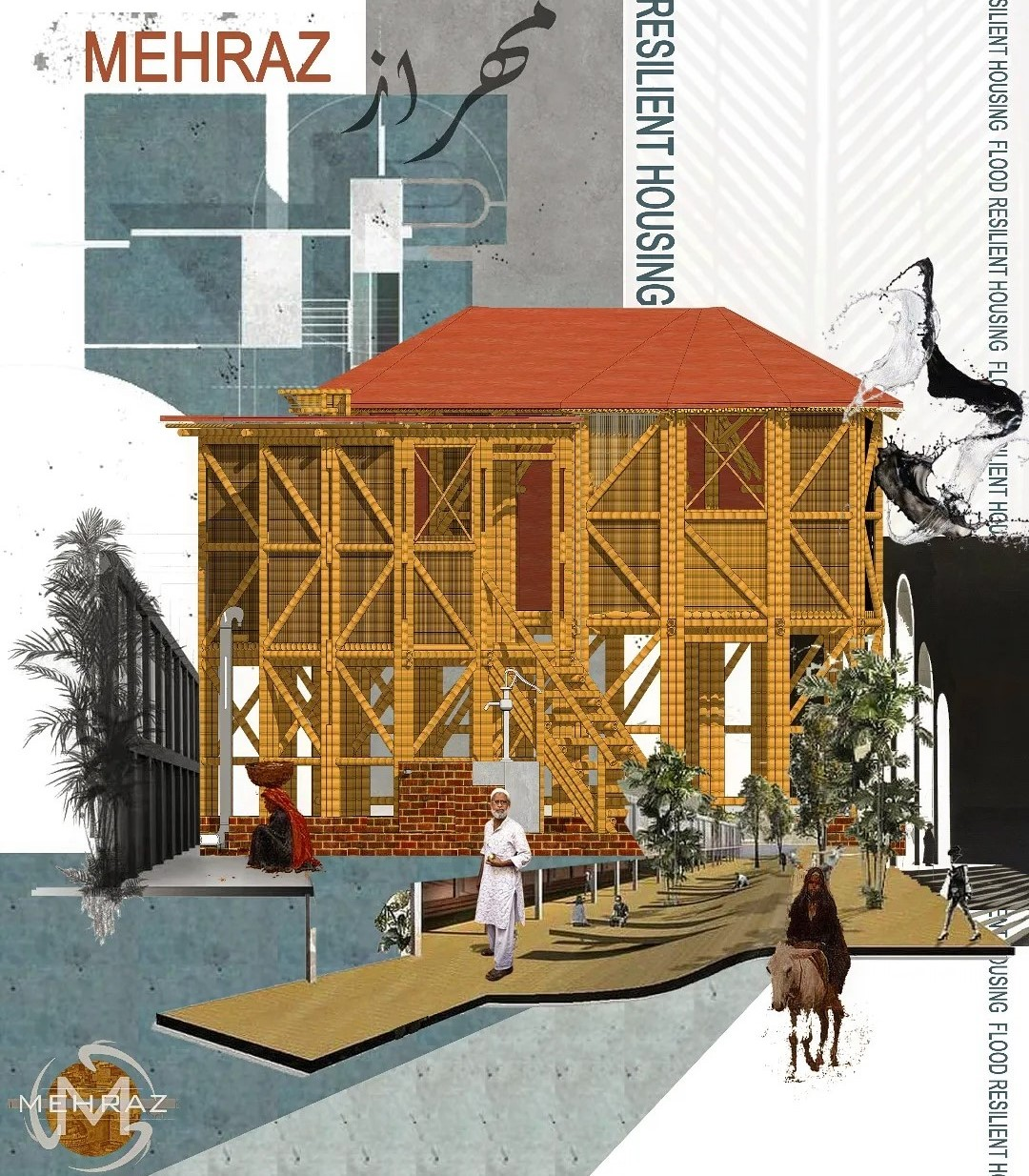
Mehraz's low-cost bamboo housing initiative for flood relief

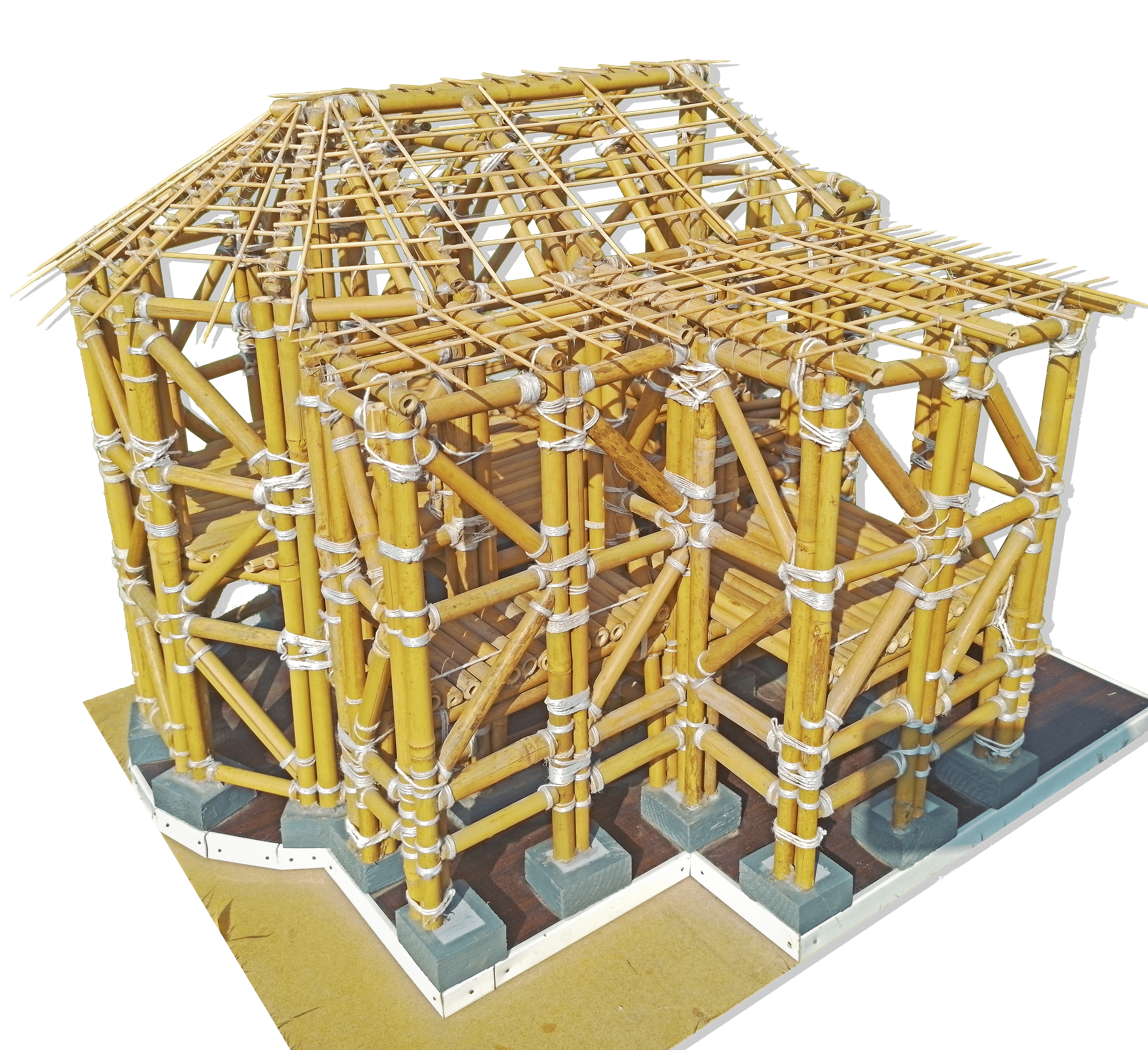
Handmade demo model of Mehraz's Flood-Resilient bamboo housing initiative

=== International ===
==== International Organizations ====
- The World Bank allocated $370 million in relief aid to Pakistan. The World Bank also allowed $2 billion from current projects in Pakistan to be reallocated to relief aid.
- United Nations:The UN has allocated $3 million from its Central Emergency Response Fund (CERF) to help the affected areas. On 30 August, UN Secretary-General António Guterres announced an appeal for $160 million in emergency funds to aid Pakistan's flood victims. On 9–10 September, Guterres visited Pakistan to show solidarity with flood victims and appeal for other countries to provide more help.
- World Health Organization: The WHO allocated $10 million to emergency health relief efforts.
- The International Rescue Committee deployed emergency response teams in Pakistan to provide immediate assistance.

==== Countries ====
- European Union: The EU announced that it is providing immediate provision of €350,000 (nearly ₨. 76 million) to Pakistan for humanitarian assistance. On 28 August, it mobilised another €2.35 million in emergency humanitarian funding.
- United States of America: On 18 August, United States Secretary of State, Antony Blinken, announced a $1 million disaster aid to Pakistan to overcome challenges caused by flooding. On 30 August, the United States announced another grant of $30 million. On 5 September, U.S. Department of State Counselor Derek Chollet announced a visit to Pakistan with a high-level delegation for a few days to provide further help to Pakistan. When in Pakistan, the United States created a massive humanitarian air bridge for flood victims. The air bridge made it possible for twenty US C-17 military aircraft to easily transport food and shelter material to Pakistan worth $2.2 million. On 9 September, the United States announced a commitment of a total of $53.1 million in US AID to Pakistan. $50.1 million for urgent flood relief and $3 million to bolster disaster resilience.
- Saudi Arabia: On 22 August, Saudi Arabia, through KSrelief, started delivering 100 emergency relief trucks, carrying 10,000 food packages weighing 950 tons to 17 flood-ravaged districts in Pakistan. This would benefit more than 70,000 people.
- China: On 25 August, a spokesman of the Chinese Foreign Ministry in a statement expressed their deep sympathies to the flood-affected victims and offered sincere condolences to the families of the victims. Emergency humanitarian aid, including 25,000 tents and relief materials, is being dispatched forthwith while 4,000 tents, 50,000 blankets, 50,000 tarpaulins, and other reserves provided by China under the framework of the China–Pakistan Economic Corridor's (CPEC) social and people's livelihood cooperation have been put into the frontline for relief. The Red Cross Society of China has already provided emergency cash assistance of $300,000 to the Pakistan Red Crescent Society. On 30 August, China announced an assistance grant of 100 million yuan (US$14.5 million). On 3 September, China announced another assistance package of 300 million yuan (US$43.5 million).
- United Kingdom: On 27 August, the Government of the United Kingdom announced £1.5m flood support fund for Pakistan. On 1 September, the UK government announced a further £15 million in assistance for Pakistan. The Disasters Emergency Committee also raised £8 million in just 24 hours.
- Azerbaijan: On 27 August, Azerbaijan announced it would provide US$2 million in aid to Pakistan.
- Ireland: On 28 August, the Irish minister of foreign affairs, Simon Coveney, said in a post on Twitter that Ireland has 'committed an initial contribution of €500,000 in emergency humanitarian funding' to Pakistan.
- Canada: On 29 August, Canada announced $5 million funding for humanitarian assistance to Pakistan. On 13 September, Canada announced bringing the total aid to $30 million and a $3 million matching fund.
- United Arab Emirates: On 29 August, the UAE opened an airbridge to transport humanitarian aid from the UAE to Pakistan, pledging 20 aircraft sorties of relief goods for flood victims worth $50 million. On 9 September, UAE Minister of Tolerance & Coexistence Nahyan bin Mubarak Al Nahyan announced aid of $10 million for relief and rehabilitation of the flood-stricken people of Pakistan, for which Prime Minister of Pakistan Shehbaz Sharif has thanked him.
  - Dubai: Mohammed bin Rashid Al Maktoum, ruler of Dubai, announced an additional 50 million AED (US$13.5 million) aid package for flood victims.
- Qatar: On 29 August, Qatar announced that they will send 21,000 food baskets, 5,000 tents, and 5,000 personal hygiene kits to Pakistan, through their Qatar Fund for Development. Emir of Qatar Tamim bin Hamad Al Thani also donated humanitarian assistance for flood victims, which includes a field hospital with a 93-member staff. In addition, Qatar established an airbridge with the Qatari Emiri Air Force to provide urgent assistance.
- India: On 29 August, Indian prime minister, Narendra Modi, extended heartfelt condolences to the families of those who were affected by the floods and said that he hopes for an early restoration of normalcy. Offers of material assistance and aid declined by the Pakistani government.
- Germany: On 30 August, Germany announced food aid to 1,000 families for two months in Pakistan's Lasbela District. Additionally, Germany also announced food aid and hygiene sets to a total of 60,000 people. On 9 September, Germany announced a further donation of €1 million to Pakistan. On 15 September, Germany announced an additional €10 million of aid for a total of 24 million. On 27 September, Germany announced that the total aid would be raised to €56 million ($54.35 million).
- South Korea: On 30 August, South Korea announced $300,000 in relief aid to Pakistan.
- Bangladesh: On 30 August 2022, Prime Minister of Bangladesh Sheikh Hasina, announced that her country will provide aid to flood victims in the Balochistan province of Pakistan. Bangladesh's Ministry of Disaster Management and Relief has allocated ৳14 million (US$140,000) to provide relief items to Pakistan including 10 tonnes of biscuit, 10 tonnes of dry cake, 100,000 water purification tablets, 50,000 packets of oral saline, 5,000 mosquito nets, 2,000 blankets, and 2,000 tents.
- Australia: On 31 August, the Australian Government announced it will provide $2 million in humanitarian aid to Pakistan.
- Japan: On 31 August, the Government of Japan announced it will provide emergency relief goods to Pakistan, containing tents and plastic sheets, through Japan International Cooperation Agency (JICA). On 6 September, Japan announced a new emergency grant of $7 million to support the people of Pakistan.
- Turkey: The Turkish sent relief goods to Pakistan, including 10,000 tents, 50,000 food parcels, 50,000 hygiene materials, and 10,000 parcels of baby food in the first stage.
- Norway: On 31 August, the Government of Norway announced 25 million NOK (US$2.5 million) in emergency relief and food security efforts. On 8 September, Norway announced an increase to their flood relief contribution to 80 million NOK (US$8.15 million).
- France: On 31 August, France, on the request of President Emmanuel Macron, announced they will donate 83 high-capacity water pumps, 200 family tents, and survival, hygiene, and protective equipment to Pakistan. France will also deploy doctors and nurses to the country and will ship a 50-meter-long Bailey bridge that could be swiftly deployed in the affected areas.
- Sweden: On 31 August, Sweden aed a 30 million SEK (US$2.8 million) donation to impacted communities.
- Iran: On 1 September, Iran sent 1000 tents, 4000 blankets, and 2000 mosquito nets.
- Denmark: On 1 September, Denmark announced 10 million DKK (US$1.35 million) in emergency assistance. Denmark also sent a water purification module that can convert contaminated water into drinking water and produce 120,000 liters of clean water per day. Along with 10 Danish specialists.
- Jordan: On 7 September, Jordan provided urgent medical assistance to Pakistan. The Royal Jordanian Air Force delivered medical supplies, tents, and food.
- Indonesia: On 26 September, the Indonesian government sent $1 million in financial assistance. 32 tons of aid in the form of tents, medicines, groceries and others were sent. Indonesia also dispatched 29 medical teams which included paramedics, pediatricians, nutritionists, dermatologists and pharmacists to help victims affected by the floods.
- Belgium: In a response to Pakistan's appeals for international aid for flood relief, Belgium will provide Pakistan 300 tents to shelter a total of 1800 people.
- Italy: In a view to contributing to the international humanitarian response, the Italian Agency for Development Cooperation has allocated a 500,000 euro (US$485,000) emergency contribution to the International Federation of Red Cross and Red Crescent Societies (IFRC) in Pakistan. The contribution will enable the IFRC to support the Pakistan Red Crescent in delivering emergency aid to the most vulnerable population segments.
- Maldives: The people of Maldives are collected money. Some of Maldivian broadcasting channels, including state media PSM, along with the Pakistan High Commission in Maldives, held a 16-hour telethon to help Pakistan and got MVR 3.8 million (US$246,000).
- Fiji: The Prime Minister Frank Bainimarama, said that high-emitting countries are to blame for the devastating flood in Pakistan.

==== Corporate Sector ====
- Apple CEO Tim Cook says Apple will donate relief goods to Pakistan for recovery efforts in flood-hit areas.
- Google announced a donation of $0.5 million for flood victims in Pakistan.
- Meta announced a donation of ₨ 125 million ($565,000) for flood relief efforts in Pakistan.

==== Private Individuals ====
- Prince Karim Aga Khan's son, Prince Rahim Aga Khan, donated $10 million for flood victims.
- On 4 October, former Malaysian Prime Minister Mahathir Mohamad has appealed to the international community to unite and assist Pakistan in coping with the extensive devastation caused by deadly floods resulting from unprecedented heavy rainfall. In a recorded message, he stated that the flood situation in Pakistan is truly a disaster that has brought immense devastation to the country.

Beyond the immediate response to the floods, the catastrophe that befell this low-income developing nation was an impetus for a global agreement on loss and damage for climate change, under which rich countries which caused the majority of carbon emissions heating the planet would compensate poor countries for the damage that has already occurred or which is unavoidable. Pakistani climate minister Sherry Rehman used this as an example of the damages that low-income nations face, which The New York Times described as "a fresh reminder of the destructive forces of climate change."

=== Recovery and rehabilitation ===
Following the immediate relief phase, Pakistan established the National Flood Response and Coordination Centre (NFRCC) to coordinate rehabilitation efforts. The government launched a cash relief program disbursing PKR 37.2 billion to 1.5 million affected families through the Benazir Income Support Programme (BISP).

The international community praised Pakistan's coordination efforts. UN agencies reached 7.5 million people with food, water, shelter, and health services, with 60% of the $816 million appeal funded.

Community Emergency Response Teams (CERTs) played a critical role in rescue operations, evacuating over 9,000 people. Notably, 36% of search and rescue volunteers were women, demonstrating significant community participation.

Pakistan launched climate-resilient reconstruction initiatives, including the "Living Indus" project. The UNDP supported construction of 800 climate-resilient homes and livelihood restoration for 200,000 people.

The floods catalyzed Pakistan's leadership in global climate advocacy. At COP27, Pakistan successfully championed the establishment of a Loss and Damage Fund, securing over $700 million in initial pledges from developed nations.

== Army helicopter crash ==
On 1 August 2022, a Pakistan Army Aviation helicopter on flood relief operations in the Lasbela area of Balochistan lost contact with air traffic control. The six military personnel on board, including the commander of the XII Corps, Lieutenant General Sarfraz Ali, died in the crash. Reports from Pakistani authorities on their early investigations attributed the crash to poor weather conditions, whereas Reuters reported on unverified claims from the Baloch terrorist group "Baloch Raaji Aajoi Sangar" that they shot the helicopter down.

== See also ==
- List of floods in Pakistan
- 2022 Afghanistan floods
- 2022 South Asian floods
- 2022 Iranian floods - although not in South Asia but occurred in the same time period
- 2023 Pakistan floods - flooding that continued the following year
- 2025 Pakistan floods
