= South Asian floods =

South Asian floods may refer to:

- 2007 South Asian floods
- 2017 South Asian floods
- 2019 South Asian floods
- 2020 South Asian floods
- 2021 South Asian floods
- 2022 South Asian floods
- 2023 South Asian floods
