= 2020 Afghanistan flood =

Floods in Afghanistan

- Location: Afghanistan
- Deaths: 190

A series of flash floods occurred in Afghanistan beginning in June 2020, with the largest and most impactful flood occurring on 26 August 2020. They were caused by torrential rain in Charikar, Parwan Province. The August floods killed at least 179 people and injured 212 others, and destroyed hundreds of houses. The Ministry of Disaster Management also reported some casualties and destruction of infrastructure in the provinces of Kapisa, Maidan Wardak, Nangarhar, Panjshir, and Paktia.

== Background ==
The annual monsoon season in South Asia stretches from June to September. The heavy rains are crucial for agriculture in the region, but also bring flash floods and subsequent mudslides which kill hundreds of people and cause billions of dollars in damage every year. The frequency and severity of flooding in Afghanistan has also been exacerbated by climate change, according to the Ministry of Disaster Management.

In the summer of 2020 severe flash flooding affected the Afghanistan provinces of Parwan, Kapisa, Panjshir, Maidan Wardak, Kabul, Nangahar, Nuristan, and Logar, with Parwan being the most severely impacted. Initial reports indicated a death toll of 145 people with thousands of households reporting the need for humanitarian assistance. The damage and destruction of water irrigation systems, hydro-power units, roads, buildings, hundreds of acres of crops, and the death of more than 1,200 livestock were also reported.

The devastating effects of these annual floods were compounded by the COVID-19 pandemic as well as the War in Afghanistan . In some areas, recovery and relief efforts were not possible due to fighting.

== Geographical and physical impacts ==
The northern and western regions of Afghanistan, particularly the Takhar, Parwan, and Herat provinces, experienced heavy rainfall starting on 21 March 2020. The torrential downpours triggered flash floods that led to mass casualties and damages. By the beginning of April, 11 deaths, 15 wounded individuals, 288 destroyed homes and an additional 400 damaged properties were reported in the foregoing provinces. Additionally, 500 hectares of crops on farmland were swept away. By the end of April, 17,000 people were reportedly affected by the floods throughout the country and an estimated 1,800 houses were ravaged or entirely destroyed.

Charikar, the capital of Parwan, was one of the cities most affected by the floods. The floods demolished most of the city, destroying over 1,500 homes and impacting 495 families according to ANDMA. The vast majority of displaced families were typically sheltered by other relatives or nearby communities while they waited for the rain, and subsequent floods or landslides, to subside.

Houses are often built in areas prone to flooding. The density of many cities, in conjunction with the rapidity with which floods occur, increase the deadliness of the natural disaster. It is recognized that climate change is increasing the frequency and destructiveness of floods occurring annually.

== Humanitarian responses ==
=== Local Response ===
ANDMA is the primary national disaster organization that has created protocols and procedures to coordinate and manage disaster-related "mitigation, preparedness, and responses" through local and national services. It is authorized as the central agency for all disaster-related interventions in the country, with Directorates in all 34 provinces of Afghanistan implementing "government-led federal and provincial coordination mechanisms". Afghanistan's development strategy incorporates ANDMA's mission to minimize all disasters' consequences to achieve their national development goals.

Reports on 29 August 2020, suggested 2,049 households were affected by the floods. ANDMA, with the collaboration of Joint Assessment Teams, confirmed 1,876 families in need of humanitarian assistance in the provinces of Parwan, Wardak, Kapisa, Logar, Kabul, Nuristan, Kunar, Laghman, and Nangarhar. The joint assessments identified the number of casualties and impact on agricultural land and public infrastructure. And in provinces like Kabul, they distributed one-month food supplies to the families affected. Furthermore, ANDMA cooperated and worked effectively with other humanitarian partners to ensure effective responses on their end.

With Parwan being the most severely impacted province with 500 damaged homes and 300-400 families displaced, the Afghan Ministry of Defense deployed its army to clear roads and carry out rescue operations. Afghan security forces also joined NATO to remove debris, lead rescue searches, and distribute aid. The Parwan Provincial authorities launched food, water, and warm clothes distribution while using schools to provide temporary shelter. They used resources from the Public Works Department to transport injured people to Kabul and Parwan Hospitals.

COVID-19 measures were impossible for displaced families to follow and exacerbated the environment for already vulnerable people. Despite local rescue and responses to flood disasters, thousands of buildings in Afghanistan are located in areas near rivers. They are prone to dangerous floods without the proper flood mitigation protocols in place.

=== International response ===
According to the United Nations Office for the Coordination of Humanitarian Affairs (OCHA), the international community recognizes that Afghanistan is at a high risk of natural disasters and associated human suffering. The European Commission INFORM risk classification designates Afghanistan as very high risk based on overall risk of hazards, low socio-economic status and limited coping mechanisms and infrastructure. Many international humanitarian actors maintain a constant presence in Afghanistan and were prepared to respond, along with ANDMA, to the floods throughout the 2020 flooding season.

Prior to the beginning of the 2020 flood season, OCHA produced the Afghanistan ICCT Flood Contingency Plan which predicted flooding in 2020 to return to typical levels after the preceding three years of drought. However, the report also recognized that the effects of climate change are likely to lead to increased frequency and intensity of severe natural weather events, including floods and that this would likely generate increased humanitarian need.

Immediately after the most severe flood event of 26 August 2020, numerous international aid organizations were on the ground in the most severely affected Parwan province and began assisting ANDMA with assessments of the damage and loss of life. The actors present were International Organization for Migration (IOM), WFP, Danish Committee for Aid to Afghan Refugees (DCAAR), Danish Refugee Council (DRC), CARE International and ARCS. By 8 September 2020, OCHA reported that the humanitarian actors had distributed non-food items (NFIs), tents, emergency shelters, cash for food and hygiene kits to 892 families. IOM also reported that NFIs, shelter, cash for food and hygiene kits were distributed by various international organizations and ANDMA to an additional 1884 families in the central region, 9 families in the eastern region and, 48 families in the southeast region.

Summary of aid provided as of 8 September 2020
	Central Region					Eastern Region		Southeast Region	
Province affected	Parwan	Wardak	Kapisa	Kabul	Logar	Laghman	Nangarhar	Khost	Paktika
International organizations assisting ANDMA	IOM, WFP, DACCAR, DRC, CARE, UNICEF, ARCS	IOM, WFP, DRC, DACAAR	IOM, DRC, WFP, UNICEF, DoRR	IOM, DRC, DACCAR	IOM, IRC, WFP, DACCAR	IOM, IRC, DACAAR	ANDMA only	IRC, ARCS, DRR, DAIL	ANDMA only
Total houses destroyed or severely damaged	972	540	298	57	243	8	1	2	46
Families that received assistance	892	393	298	58	243	8	1	2	46

== Immediate mortality and morbidity implications ==
The August 2020 flood in Afghanistan was the third deadliest natural disaster of 2020, worldwide. The flash flood resulted in initial reports of 145 deaths along with 167 seriously injured as of 29 August 2020. These numbers increased to 179 deaths and 212 seriously injured on 22 September 2020, 157 of the deaths were reported in Parwan Province alone. Injuries and causes of death were mostly from sources connected to head trauma, drowning and electrocution. A local hospital in Parwan was destroyed in the disaster, further complicating treating the injured in the most affected province. The context of the flash flood, in the midst of the COVID-19 pandemic, along with civil conflict created an environment for further potential mortality and morbidity implications. During the search and rescue efforts following the flood the Taliban opened fire on civilians killing 4 flood survivors and injuring 3 others. The floods left affected populations with limited food and sources of livelihood, which combined with other factors left the vulnerable to epidemics and infectious diseases including water borne and lung related illnesses, and the spread of COVID-19.

== Short and longer term health consequences ==
=== Short term consequences ===
The 2020 Afghanistan floods led to multiple casualties, health issues, and property damage. Short-term health impacts from the flooding were death and an increase in risk of malaria and cholera spread due to the increase in unsanitary, standing water. Although the International Rescue Committee (IRC) warned of an increase in cholera, the assumption that cholera rates will always rise after flooding events has been questioned in the past especially in areas, such as Afghanistan, where cholera is not endemic. The number of casualties/people affected varied depending on the province where the flooding occurred, with political strife and other social issues impacting the numbers of missing persons and casualties reported. In April 2020, OCHA estimated that 17,000 people had been affected by flooding until that point in Afghanistan. As flooding continued well into August of that same year, numbers are most likely greater.

Other additional short-term impacts from the flooding were housing loss, agricultural land/crop losses, and displacement. With a high quantity of people leaving the flooded areas and staying in neighboring communities until they could return to their homes, COVID-19 transmission was greater in the provinces affected by flooding. Short-term impacts such as housing and crop losses also often transmute into long-term issues, such as an increase in economic instability (and lack of access to proper healthcare), malnutrition, and lack of access to sanitary water sources (affecting the spread of communicable diseases).

Natural (and human-impacted) disasters increase the percentages of premature “Years of Life Lost”, even when death was not the initial short-term impact. In regard to children, they face serious physical and mental health impacts when losing a parent as immediate loss of economic stability, food safety, and shelter generate a multitude of physical and mental health issues, both short- and long-term. Organizations such as NATO and OCHA have worked to assist with these issues impacting local people from the flooding and various plans have been proposed for disaster risk management in the area to prevent future issues.

=== Long term consequences ===
The impacts of the 2020 floods had lasting impacts on an already at-risk population. By exacerbating one of the rural region's biggest long-term health care challenges, access, two of the biggest health challenges the region faced, non-communicable disease screening and treatment, and mental health care became even more challenging to deal with. Non communicable diseases are a major concern throughout the country as a whole, accounting for more than 35% of mortality overall. The rates of cardiovascular disease and cancer are exacerbated by a population that has an unhealthy diet and a high incident of smoking. Providing care for the ill presents challenges in the remote provinces under normal circumstances, as the world bank notes clinics are understaffed and resources are scarce. In the wake of the floods it became increasingly difficult as the population became more unstable.

Another long-term health impact of the 2020 flooding can be attributed to the destruction of poorly built housing in the provinces affected. The lack of a stable living environment and deaths associated with building collapses due to flash flooding took an additional emotional toll on a population already ravaged by both uncontrolled COVID-19 outbreaks and war. It is estimated that 50% of the afghan population has mental health issues, with the rural populations affected by the flooding at increased risk. To compound and already poor situation, access to mental health services remains an issue in the country, with less than 10% of afghans having access to services.

== Lessons learned from this disaster ==
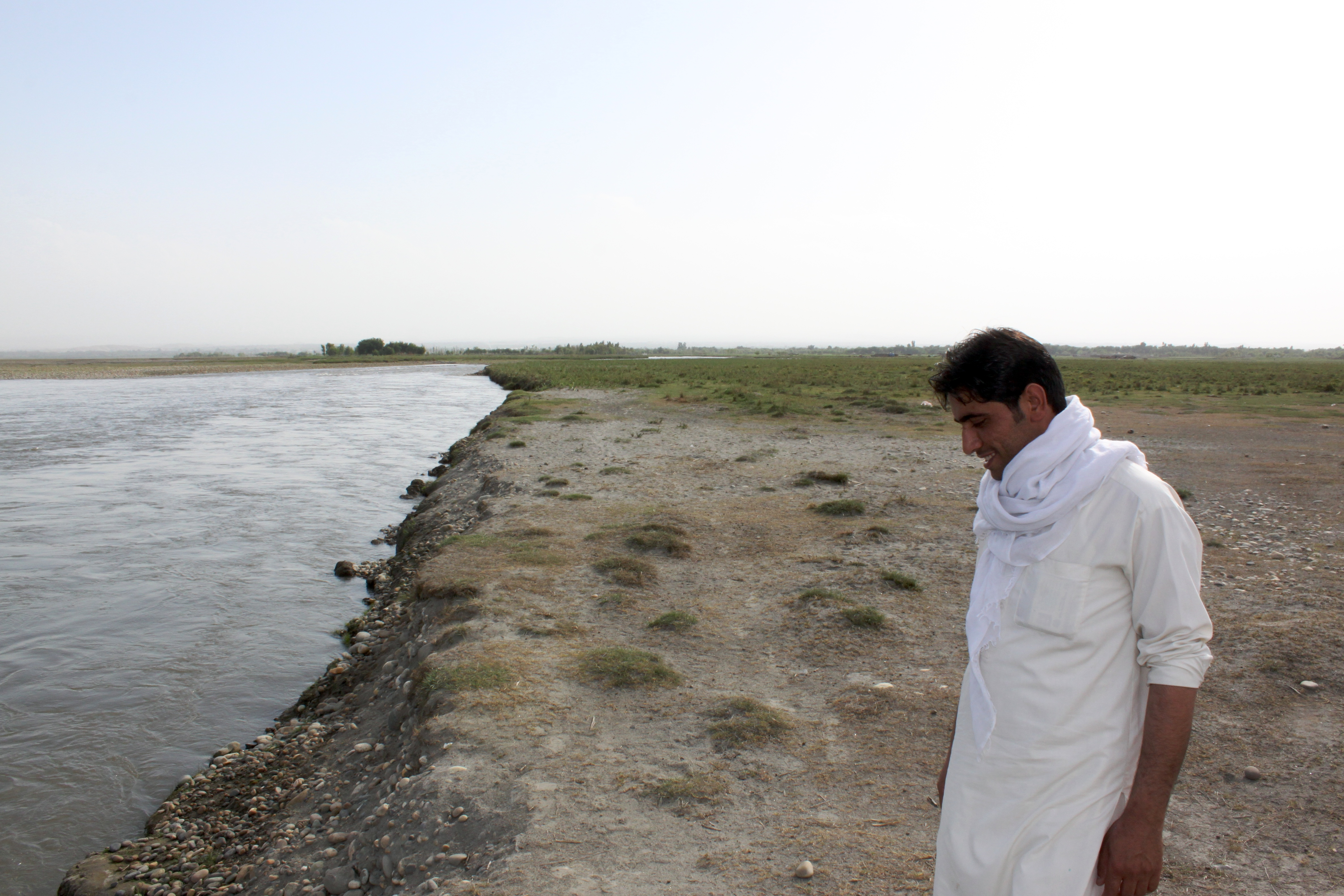
Flood prevention in Afghanistan

The underlying driver of increased levels of flash flooding in Afghanistan is broadly accepted to be climate change, as changing weather patterns create longer droughts, making the dry land impenetrable to heavy monsoon rains. In addition, the natural and human-created causes that exacerbate the impact of such floods have also been known since at least 2011, when the 'Afghanistan Strategic National Action Plan (SNAP) for Disaster Risk Reduction: Towards Peace and Stable Development' was published.

The recommended approach for long term flood prevention in the Kabul River Basin is related to evening out the flow of water throughout the year, rather than reducing it overall, and one proposal is to build a series of dams on both the Afghanistan and Pakistan sides of the Kabul River Basin at an estimated cost of $15Bn. According to World Bank estimates, the projects would have an anticipated annual return of US$1Bn, making the payback period for the infrastructure investment 15 years. In the context of the political reality between Pakistan and Afghanistan, as well as the recent return of the Taliban to power in Afghanistan, it is not currently known if a project of this scale is feasible.

Measures that could reduce the likelihood or severity of flooding include limiting land expansion for agriculture and introducing more localized, targeted water management infrastructure. Measures that could reduce the impact of flooding include rebuilding properties outside of the flood risk areas and improving infrastructure. Weak governance in Afghanistan is one factor why these urban planning initiatives may continue to be neglected. Flood prevention measures are not currently mentioned on the 'Programs and Projects' section of the Charikar Municipality website, which does reference commercial development and road infrastructure projects.

== See also ==
- 2013 Pakistan–Afghanistan floods
- Floods in Afghanistan
- List of deadliest floods
- List of flash floods
- List of natural disasters by death toll
