= 2024 Afghanistan–Pakistan floods =

Natural disaster in Afghanistan and Pakistan

Afghanistan-Pakistan floods of 2024
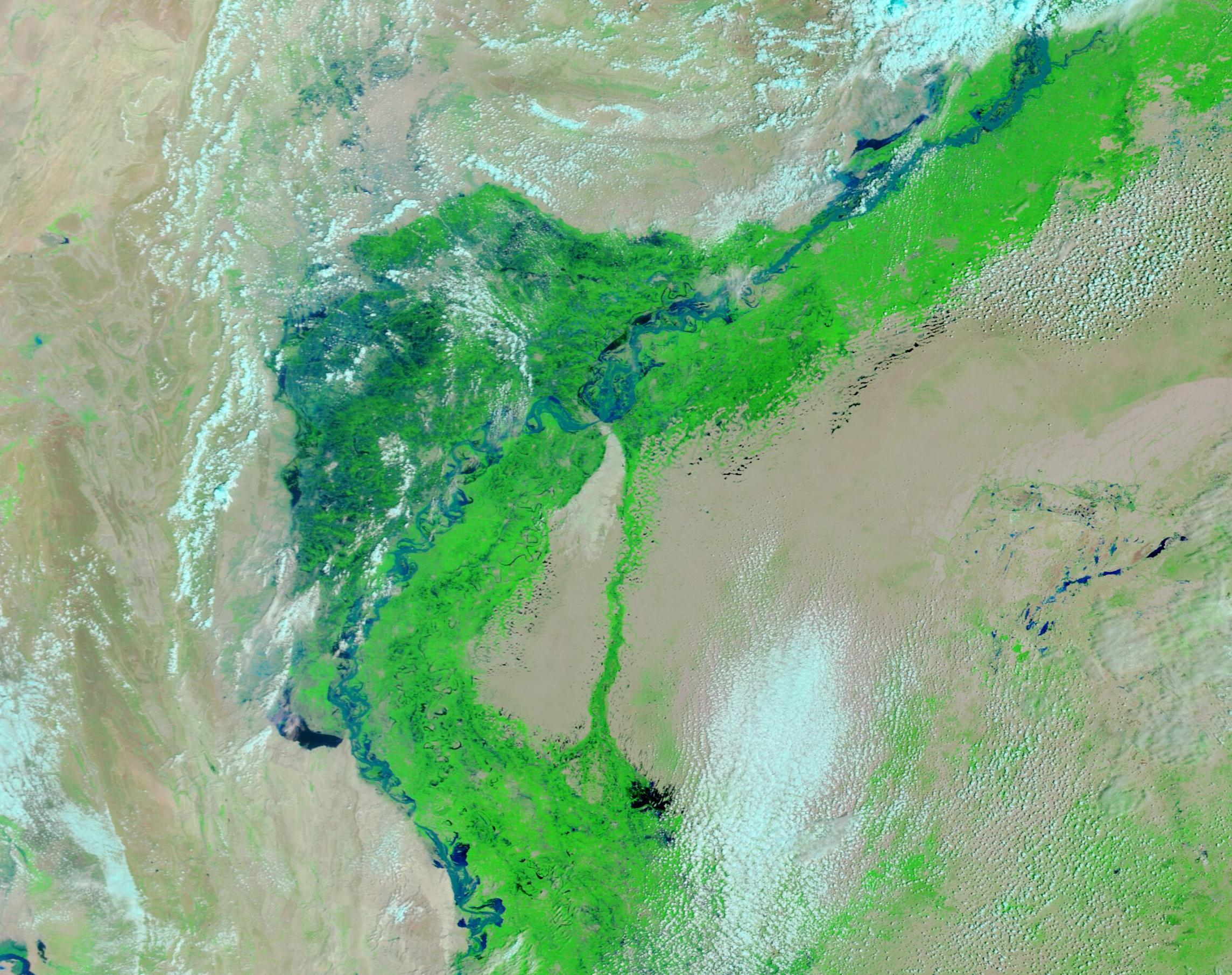
- Floods in Pakistan in April 2024
- Duration: 6 March 2024 – 4 September 2024
- Location: Afghanistan, Pakistan
- Cause: Heavy rainfall, flash floods
- Deaths: 1,084 (Note: 700 in Afghanistan: 100 in April; 540 in May; 60 in July; 384 in Pakistan: 40 in March; 99 in April; 245 in August)
- Injuries: 2,600 (Note: 2,060 in Afghanistan: 54 in April; 1,656 in May; 350 in July; 540 in Pakistan: 94 in March; 446 in August)
- Missing: 40

Between 6 March and 4 September 2024, unusually heavy rains and resulting flash flooding in Afghanistan and Pakistan killed over 1,000 people, and injured many more. The flooding extensively damaged infrastructure and agriculture as well.

== Damage and casualties ==
=== Afghanistan ===
During floods in April more than 100 people died and 54 were injured due to heavy rains and floods in 23 provinces. At least 2,134 houses were destroyed and 10,789 livestock were killed. The United Nations Office for the Coordination of Humanitarian Affairs in Afghanistan reported that heavy rains and floods affected more than 25,000 families and damaged nearly 1,000 houses. Department spokesman Janan Sayeq reported that most casualties occurred due to roof collapses. Over 600 km (370 mi) of road and 9,271 hectares (22,910 acres) of agricultural land were flooded.

The United Nations said further flooding on 10–11 May killed 540 people, with the Afghan World Food Programme office reporting 1,651 injuries. In Baghlan Province, 300 died, 100 others were injured, 1,000 houses were destroyed and many more damaged. In Baghlani Jadid District, 100 people were killed and 1,500 houses sustained damage. There were also 2,042 damaged houses in Burka District.

Another 20 people died and 80 more were injured in Takhar Province, while another three were killed in Herat Province. The provinces of Badakhshan and Ghor were also affected. Floods continued throughout 17–18 May, killing 150 people. There were 84 deaths, five injuries and 40 missing in Faryab Province, where 1,870 houses were damaged, while another 55 died and hundreds more were missing in Ghor, where 3,000 houses were destroyed and 6,000 more were damaged; over 2,000 houses were destroyed, 4,000 others were damaged and 2,000 shops were submerged by floodwater in Chaghcharan alone.

Flooding on 15–16 July killed at least 60 people. Severe damage occurred in Nangarhar Province, where 47 people died and 350 others were injured, with 400 homes destroyed. Flooding also killed five people in Kunar Province, destroying 50 houses and 405 km (252 mi) of road there. In Kapisa Province, five people died and 35 houses were destroyed.

=== Pakistan ===
On 6 March, heavy rains caused a landslide in Swat District, killing over 40 people.

Throughout April, a further 99 people, including 44 children, were killed and 94 were injured in additional floods, which damaged over 3,500 houses and 464 schools. The most affected province was Khyber Pakhtunkhwa, where 64 deaths were recorded, followed by Punjab with 21 deaths and Balochistan with 15 deaths. Torrential rains caused floods and power outages in Khyber Pakhtunkhwa, Balochistan, Punjab and Azad Jammu and Kashmir. A majority of the deaths were caused by lightning killing farmers harvesting wheat crops, and rains causing homes to collapse. Streets in several cities were flooded. Rainfall also lashed Islamabad. Authorities declared a state of emergency in Balochistan.

In August, flooding continued in the country, killing 245 people, injuring 446 others, destroying 1,002 houses and damaged 3,475 others, 35 bridges and eight schools.

== Causes ==
The extreme rainfall was in stark contrast to the unusually dry winter. The resulting dry soil struggled to absorb the rain, which exacerbated the flooding. Some experts cited climate change as the cause.

== Response and recovery ==
Pakistan's National Disaster Management Authority advised emergency services to be on high alert, as another round of heavy rains was expected. The confirmed dead include 25 children, 12 men and nine women, while the injured include 11 women, 33 men and 16 children. The Pakistan Meteorological Department predicted more intermittent rain in all four provinces. The ongoing rains with possible flooding in Balochistan and Khyber Pakhtunkhwa were thought to have continued until 22 April.

== See also ==
- Floods in Afghanistan
- List of floods in Pakistan
- List of deadliest floods
- List of flash floods
- List of natural disasters by death toll
