= 2022 Iranian floods =

Natural disaster in Iran

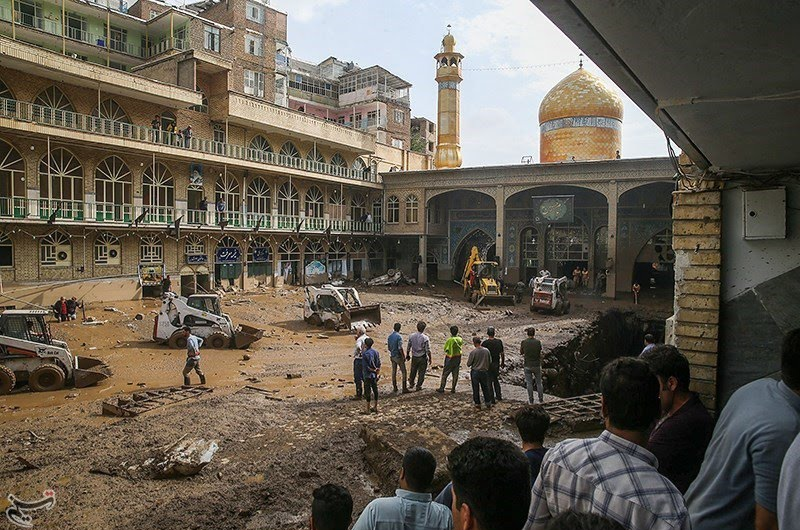
- A mosque buried by a mudslide in Tehran
- Date: 23–30 July 2022
- Location: Mazandaran, Yazd, Sistan and Baluchistan
- Deaths: 95
- Missing: 200+
- Property damage: $200 million (2022 USD)

In late July 2022, Iran was hit by historic floods and mudslides which affected 400 towns and villages in 21 of Iran's 31 provinces, and destroyed over 20,000 homes. In the provinces of Mazandaran and Yazd, deaths were high. At least 95 people have been reported dead and over 200 others are missing. Preliminary agricultural damage was estimated at 60 trillion rials (US$200 million).

== Events ==
Rainfall across Iran on 2 August 2022

On 11 July, rescue missions such as the Iranian Red Crescent went to help families in 51 villages in the Sistan and Baluchistan province.

On 6 August 2022, floods hit Imamzadeh.

== See also ==
- Great Iran Flood, a 1954 flood in Iran
- 2022 Pakistan floods, a disaster that occurred in the same time period.
