= List of flash floods =

This list of notable flash floods summarizes the most widely reported events.

Date	Fatalities	Cause	Country	Description
11 March 1864	240	dam failure	England	Great Sheffield Flood, Sheffield
31 May 1889	2208	dam failure	US	Johnstown Flood Johnstown, Pennsylvania, Most fatalities from a flash flood in US history.
11 September 1891	359	heavy rain	Spain	Consuegra, Castilla-La Mancha
14 June 1903	247	thunderstorm	US	Heppner Flood of 1903, Oregon, Second-deadliest flash flood in the United States; kills almost a quarter of the town's residents.
11 July 1912	8	thunderstorm	US	Mazuma, Nevada, Postmistress among the dead. Relief efforts include a fund set up by William Randolph Hearst.
15 January 1919	21	dam failure	US	Great Molasses Flood, Boston, 8-to-15-foot (2.4 to 4.6 m) wall of molasses from a collapsed distillation storage tank moves through the streets at 35 miles per hour (56 km/h) killing 21, injuring 150
12 March 1928	431	dam failure	United States	St. Francis Dam, San Francisquito Canyon The dam failed catastrophically in 1928, killing at least 431 people in the subsequent flood, in what is considered to have been one of the worst American civil engineering disasters of the 20th century and the third-greatest loss of life in California history.
20 March 1929	1	heavy rain	New Zealand	1929 New Zealand cyclone, Otago and Canterbury, New Zealand. Flooding in many parts of the South Island, especially around the city of Dunedin, where 139 millimetres (5.5 in) of rain falls in 24 hours. A railway worker dies in a washout on the line between Dunedin and Ranfurly
19 February 1938	21	thunderstorm	New Zealand	Kopuawhara flash flood of 1938, Māhia Peninsula, New Zealand: a temporary camp for rail workers next to a river is hit by a 5-metre (16 ft) high wall of water already swollen by heavy rain associated with Typhoon Haikui.
15 August 1952	34	heavy rain	England	Lynmouth Flood
31 January 1953	2394	heavy storm	The Netherlands, Belgium, England, Scotland	North Sea flood of 1953, a combination of a high spring tide and a severe European windstorm over the North Sea causes a storm tide. As a result, the Dutch Delta Works are authorized, an elaborate project to enable emergency closing of the mouths of most estuaries, to prevent flood surges upriver.
17 June 1965	0	heavy rain	US	1965 Philmont Scout Ranch flash flood, Philmont Scout Ranch, New Mexico
25 November 1967	464	heavy rain	Portugal	115 to 129 millimetres (4.5 to 5.1 in) rain in 5 hours at up to 30 millimetres (1.2 in) per hour near Lisbon, Portugal
4 January 1971	32	monsoon	Malaysia	Kuala Lumpur floods
9 June 1972	238	dam failure	US	Black Hills flood, South Dakota, 15 inches (38 cm) in 6 hours
31 July 1976	143	thunderstorm	US	Big Thompson River flood, Colorado
11 August 1979	1800–25,000	dam failure	India	Machchu-2 dam failed due to heavy upstream rain, washes out the town of Morbi and nearby villages of Gujarat, India. Estimated deaths range from 1800 to 25,000 people. Considered worst flash flood of history.
24 July 1982	299	heavy rain	Japan	maximum 187 millimetres (7.4 in) rainfall per an hour in Nagayo, Nagasaki, floods, landslides, and bridge, house, buildings collapses occur simultaneously in the suburbs of Nagasaki, Kyushu Island, Japan
19 November 1983	10	heavy rain	Portugal	maximum rate of 24 millimetres (0.94 in) in 30 minutes near Lisbon, Portugal, with similar intensity of 1967 event; much lower fatalities due to lessons learned
16 July 1987	10	heavy rain	US	The Guadalupe River floods in Texas Hill Country after a series of severe thunderstorms dumps 5 to 11.5 inches (130 to 290 mm) of rainfall in its headwaters basin. Hundreds of people had to be rescued; 10 teenagers at a summer camp lost their lives.
14 June 1990	26	heavy rain	US	Shadyside, Ohio
16 June 1990	4	thunderstorm	US	Duck Creek Floods of 1990 near Davenport, Iowa,
12 August 1997	11	thunderstorm	US	Antelope Canyon, Arizona
20 July 1998	63	heavy rain	Slovakia	Jarovnice, Slovakia. Combination of heavy rain and collapse of dam formed by debris causes flood wave that inundates the unprotected Romani settlement.
18 October 1998	31	heavy rain	US	San Marcos, Texas, rains totaling from 15 to 30 inches (380 to 760 mm)
11 September 2000	10	heavy rain	Japan	According to Japan Meteorological Agency official confirmed report, a 100 millimetres (3.9 in) to 114 millimetres (4.5 in) principation per a single hour, total 428 millimetres (16.9 in) to 492 millimetres (19.4 in) principation per twelve hours, following flash floods in Nagoya and surrounding area, another 150 persons are wounded, Japanese government official confirmed report.
30 August 2003	6	heavy rain	US	Jacobs Creek Flood, Kansas Turnpike near Emporia, Kansas
16 August 2004	0	heavy rain	England	Boscastle flood, Cornwall
6 August 2006	350	heavy rain	Ethiopia	Eastern Ethiopia, tens of thousands are displaced
13 August 2006	125	heavy rain	Ethiopia	Southern Ethiopia, hundreds of thousands are displaced
3 July 2007	64		Sudan	Sudan floods
2 November 2007	0	heavy rain	US	Mount Rainier National Park, Washington
12 June 2008	0	thunderstorm	US	The 12–13 June 2008 floods around Duck Creek in Davenport, Iowa
4 August 2009	0	thunderstorm	US	The 2009 Kentuckiana Flash Flood results from 3 to 6 inches (76 to 152 mm) of rain falling in less than an hour near Louisville, Kentucky
9 September 2009	31	heavy rain	Turkey	Turkish flash floods.
19 September 2009	10	heavy rain	US	2009 Southeastern United States floods included flash flooding around Atlanta, Georgia
26 September 2009	100	tropical storm	Philippines	Metro Manila, primarily Marikina, Taguig, and Pasig; and several municipalities in the provinces of Rizal, Bulacan, and Laguna, taking more than a hundred lives and leaving thousands of affected residents homeless. It also submerges several municipalities under feet deep of water for several weeks. It is caused by Typhoon Ketsana.
1 October 2009	37	heavy rain	Italy	Giampilieri, Messina, Sicily. See Also 2009 Messina floods and mudslides
10 October 2009			Philippines	10–13 October in Northern Luzon causing major landslides in the Cordillera Mountains, and submerging 80% of the province of Pangasinan.
October 2009	0	heavy rain	US	In late October, a rainy nor'easter causes several flash floods in Southeast Virginia and injures over 100 people.
25 November 2009	122	heavy rain	Saudi Arabia	More than 122 people die in flash floods that sweep away highways and neighborhoods in the city of Jeddah, Saudi Arabia, caused by heavy rains.
20 February 2010	42	heavy rain	Portugal	2010 Madeira floods and mudslides: 108 to 165 millimetres (4.3 to 6.5 in) of rain fell in 5 hours, much more than the monthly February average of 88 millimetres (3.5 in). 51 people die, 250 are injured, and at least eight people are missing.
April 2010			US	April–May: The great Nashville, Tennessee, flood. Water in the Cumberland river rose, flooding downtown Nashville and surrounding areas.
11 June 2010	20	heavy rain	US	The Little Missouri River risse over 20 feet (6.1 m) in only a few hours, 2010 Arkansas floods
24 July 2010	0	dam failure	US	Delhi Dam on Iowa's Maquoketa River breaches after 9 inches (230 mm) of rainfall. 8,000 people evacuate and 15 ft (4.6 m) chunks of highway break off and are swept down river. Contributed to flooding the Mississippi River in Davenport, Iowa.
July 2010	1400	monsoon	Pakistan	Mid–July till mid-August, Pakistan's three provinces are badly affected during the monsoon rains when dams, rivers and lakes overflow, killing at least 1400 people and affecting 3.5 million people.
6 August 2010	180	cloud burst	India	Leh, India. More than 180 people are reported to have died with 400 missing and 300 injured due to flash floods, caused probably due to cloud burst. Injured and stranded public are airlifted by Indian army.
4 October 2010	7	chemical plant accident	Hungary	Flood caused by the Ajka alumina plant accident in western Hungary A dam wall collapses, freeing about one million cubic metres (35 million cubic feet) of highly alkaline liquid waste, called red mud, from the Ajkai Timföldgyár alumina plant in Ajka, Veszprém County. The mud is released as a 1–2 m (3–7 ft) wave, flooding several nearby localities, including the village of Kolontár and the town of Devecser. The flood kills seven persons and the high pH (~13) of the sludge burned several hundred people and devastated more than 40 km^{2} (15 sq mi) of ground in the basin of the Danube river.
18 October 2010	0	heavy rain	West Indies	St. Lucia, West Indies: The flood displaces about 500 people and receives immediate assistance from local government and international organizations. No fatalities nor injuries are reported.
27 – 28 July 2011	1	heavy rain	US	Dubuque County, Iowa – Jo Daviess County, Illinois
11 January 2011	35	heavy rain	Australia	2010–2011 Queensland floods, Australia
7 July 2012	172	heavy rain	Russia	2012 Russian floods Krasnodarsky krai
7 August 2012	89	monsoon	Philippines	2012 Philippine floods Monsoon enhanced by Typhoon Haikui brings torrential rain and floods to Metro Manila and nearby provinces
1 April 2013	101	rain storm	Argentina	2013 Argentina floods For five hours, extremely heavy rainfall on northeastern section of Buenos Aires Province, Argentina results in several flash floods that claim the lives of at least 101 people. Greater La Plata is hardest hit with 91 reported deaths, and Greater Buenos Aires reports ten deaths. Is the worst flooding in La Plata's history.
19 June 2013	5	heavy rains	Canada	2013 Alberta floods Considered by some a 1-in-100 year rain event, this flash flood-like event resulted in catastrophic flooding that was the worst in Alberta recorded history. At least 28 emergency operations centers were activated, 100,000 people were displaced, and damages were estimated at $5 billion.
17 November 2013	18	heavy rain	Italy	Cyclone Cleopatra, Northeast Sardinia. See Also 2013 Sardinia floods
29 – 30 April 2014	2+	heavy rain	USA	Alabama, Florida
7 June 2014	73	rain storm	Afghanistan	2014 Baghlan floods High rainfall contributes to the flash flood that destroyed hundreds of mud homes.
7 September 2014	300	monsoon floods	India, Pakistan	Floods caused by five days of heavy rain kill 300 people.
27 June 2015	1	heavy rain	US	2015 Philmont Scout Ranch flash flood, Philmont Scout Ranch, New Mexico
7 July 2015	0	heavy rain	US	2015 Ghost Ranch flash flood, Ghost Ranch, New Mexico
14 September 2015	21	rain storms	US	2015 Utah floods Sudden downpours cause flash flooding of canyons in Hildale, Utah, and Zion National Park, killing 21 people- 13 people in Hildale and a group of 7 canyoners in Zion National Park.
25 October 2015	17+	rain storms	Egypt	Alexandria and Nile Delta region of Northern Egypt. Strong rains on 25 October and 4 November cause flash flooding and result in the deaths of at least 17 people, including five electrocuted when a tram power line collapsed into a puddle.
5 November 2015	3	rain storms	Jordan	Flash flooding occurs in the Jordanian capital Amman causing 3 deaths when a severe thunderstorm lasts over 30 minutes.
30 July 2016	2	heavy rain	US	2016 Maryland flood – A historic and deadly flash flood strikes Ellicott City, Maryland due an estimated 6 inches (15 cm) of rain falling in the city within only two hours. It is said to have been a "1000-year flood" event by the NWS.
15 July 2017	10	heavy rain, wildfire burn scar	US	2017 Payson flash floods A flash flood occurred at a popular swimming hole near Payson, Arizona, the flood kills 10 members of an extended family.
15 November 2017	24	heavy rain	Greece	2017 West Attica floods Flash floods occur in the towns of Mandra, Nea Peramos and Megara, towards west of Athens, due to heavy rain. 24 people die due to this disaster along with significant damage to property.
26 April 2018	10	heavy rain	Israel	Heavy rainfall in the Negev desert causes a flash flood in the Tzafit canyon trapping a group of hikers and resulting in 10 fatalities.
27 May 2018	1	heavy rain	US	2018 Maryland flood Just two years after a historic and deadly flash flood struck the region, another heavy rain brings around 8 inches (20 cm) in two hours to Elliccott City, Maryland, resulting in a disaster that is assessed to be much worse than the previous one. This is the second "1000-year flood" event in two years.
4 July 2018	0	heavy rain	US	Heavy rainfall causes flash flooding in Houston, Texas, and the surrounding area, causing the cancellation of 4 July festivities.
5 July 2018	0	heavy rain	US	Heavy rainfall causes flash flooding in Canton, Ohio, and other parts of Stark County.
21 August 2018	11	heavy rain	Italy	A flash flood in a gorge in the southern Italian region of Calabria kills 11 hikers.
25 October 2019	10	heavy rain	Japan	Heavy rainfall, total 60 to 120 millimetres (2.4 to 4.7 in) per an hour, and 160 to 280 millimetres (6.3 to 11.0 in) on twelve hours precipitation, and resulting to flash flooding, landslide around Boso Peninsula, Chiba Prefecture, Japan.
20 July 2021	302 (50 missing)	heavy rain	China	According to China Meteorological Administration official confirmed report, a heavy rain 617.1 millimetres (24.30 in) in the past three days by 20 July, including 201.9 millimetres (7.95 in), per a single hour in Zhengzhou, Henan Province, China. According to Chinese government official confirmed report, flood sweeps away many persons and vehicles are stuck in downtown area, and part section of Zhengzhou Subway Line 5 also damaged, and flash flooding hits neighborhooud Kaifeng, Luohe, Xinxiang, total government and economic damaged on 90.98 billion renminbi (14.08 billion US dollars).
12 August 2021	21 (4 missing)	heavy rain	China	According to China Meteorological Administration official confirmed report, a heavy rain 459 millimetres (18.1 in) to 519 millimetres (20.4 in) past 18 hours by 12 August in Suizhou, Yicheng, Liulin, Hubei Province, China. including 117.9 millimetres (4.64 in), per a single hour in Liulin. According to Chinese government official confirmed report, flood sweeps away many persons and vehicles are stuck in a wide area.
18 August 2021	0	heavy rain	Sweden	In Gävle, Sweden, 161.6 mm of rain was measured by an automatic weather station during a period of 24 hours within the area, 101 mm of which falls in just 2 hours resulting in considerable flooding within multiple counties, including Gävleborg County & Dalarnas county. Entire neighborhoods were flooded, landslides occurred & vehicles were submerged into the waters
26 July 2022	1	heavy rain	US	12.86 inches (327 mm) is reported in a span of 5 hours in 26 July 2022 in St. Louis, Missouri.
27 – 28 July 2022	39	heavy rain	US	Extremely heavy rain falls over portions of Eastern Kentucky and surrounding areas between 27 July and 28 July 2022. Some areas report up to 10 inches (250 mm) of rain in less than 12 hours.
21 – 22 August 2022	1	heavy rain	US	2022 Dallas floods
27 January 2023	4	heavy rain	New Zealand	2023 Auckland Anniversary Weekend floods. NIWA reports a record breaking 260.6 millimeters (10 in) falls across the city of Auckland, New Zealand in a span of 8 hours, landslides destroy homes, over $10 million worth of high-end luxury vehicles are severely damaged.
12 – 13 April 2023	0	heavy rain	US	2023 Fort Lauderdale floods. On 12 April 2023, a historic flash flood event occurs in Fort Lauderdale, Florida, and surrounding areas. The Fort Lauderdale area reports 25.6 inches (65 cm) of rain within approximately 12 hours.
21 – 22 July 2023	3 (1 missing)	heavy rain	Canada	2023 Nova Scotia floods
29 October 2024	238	heavy rain	Spain	2024 Spain floods
8 – 9 May 2025	104	heavy rain	Democratic Republic of the Congo	Heavy rain causes the Kasaba River, in South Kivu, Congo to burst its banks, destroying at least 150 homes.
4 July 2025	136+, (3 missing)	heavy rain	US	July 2025 Central Texas floods
14 August 2026	14	heavy rain	Japan	Heavy rainfall, total 97 to 115 millimetres (3.8 to 4.5 in) per an hour, and 309 to 386 millimetres (12.2 to 15.2 in) on twelve hours precipitation, and resulting to flash flooding, landslide around Sakura and Chiba City, Chiba Prefecture, Japan, another 46 persons were injures, according to Japanese government official confirmed report.
26 August 2026	1494+ (6000+ missing)	glacier collapse	Nepal, China	2026 Nepal–Tibet floods
11 October 2026	(5 missing)	dry landslide	Nepal	2026 Budhi Gandaki flood

== See also ==
- List of deadliest floods
- List of major dam failures
- 2021 European floods
