= 2021 Nuristan floods =

2021 floods in Nuristan, Afghanistan

- Nuristan province in Afghanistan
- Date: 28 July 2021 – August 2021
- Cause: Heavy rainfall
- Deaths: 113

Flooding began in the Kamdesh District in Nuristan, Afghanistan, due to heavy rains. As of July 31, the death toll is at 113 while the number of people missing is unknown. According to Taliban spokesman Zabihullah Mujahed, heavy rain on July 28 caused the flooding.

== Impact and aftermath ==
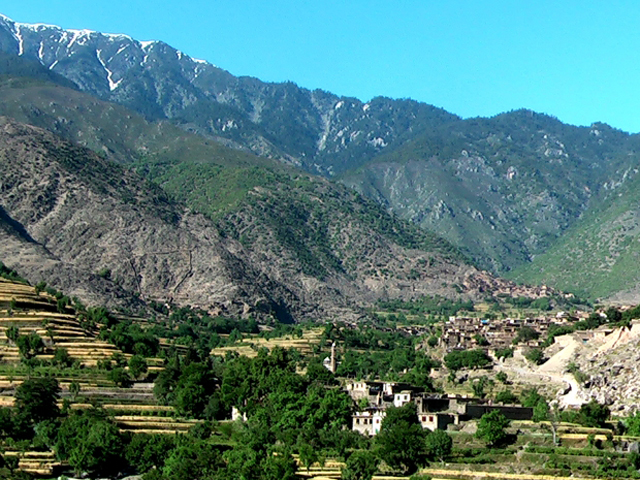
Kamdesh, Afghanistan

According to Ghulam Bahauddin Jailani, 173 houses were damaged. A number of orchards and 12 kilometers of road were also destroyed in the rain adding to road closure. Nuristan governor Hafiz Abdul Qayum stated that affected families have received government support. Assessments showed tents, beds, and kitchen sets were in need.

The Taliban stated that it has prevented the infiltration of the government forces areas affected by flooding. Lawmakers in the area claimed the Taliban were thwarting the rescue. The third wave of COVID-19 also made it difficult for medical teams to reach affected areas.

Zabiullah Mujahed has ordered the Taliban's own rescue crews to the affected area and has also ordered that 5 million Afghanis or about $62,000 be spent aiding the clean up and the people affected by the flooding.

== See also ==
- 2020 Afghanistan flood
- Floods in Afghanistan
