= 2010–2011 Southern Africa floods =

Floods in 3 countries in Southern Africa in 2010–2011

2010–2011 Southern African floods
- Date: December 2010 – 2011
- Location: South Africa, Mozambique, Zimbabwe, Namibia, Botswana, Zambia and Malawi
- Deaths: At least 141
- Property damage: R1.4 billion (US$200 million)

The 2010–2011 Southern Africa floods were a series of floods across three countries in Southern Africa. Linked to a La Niña event, above-average rains starting in December led to widespread flooding. Thousands of people were displaced and evacuations of more continued. As of 24 January 2011, at least 141 people were known to have been killed, including 88 in KwaZulu Natal. The South African government declared 33 disaster zones.

== Background ==
In December 2010, a global weather pattern known as La Niña resulted in increased rainfall over Southern Africa. Similar events related to the La Niña took place in several other countries around the world, including Australia, Sri Lanka, Brazil, Pakistan and the Philippines.

== South Africa ==
In South Africa, more than 6,000 people had been displaced and 70 known to have been killed due to the floods. This number is expected to rise as police continue to search for an unknown number of missing persons. Eight of the country's nine provinces have been declared disaster areas, allowing for national funds to be distributed. Preliminary estimates placed crop damage at R1 billion ($145 million US$). Property damage was also estimated at $52 million. An estimated 20,000 hectares (49,000 acres) of agricultural land had been affected by the floods.

The South African Air Force was brought in to aid in evacuating residents through air lifts by 15 January. In a statement Co-operative Government Minister Sicelo Shiceka, displaced residents were told not to return to their homes.

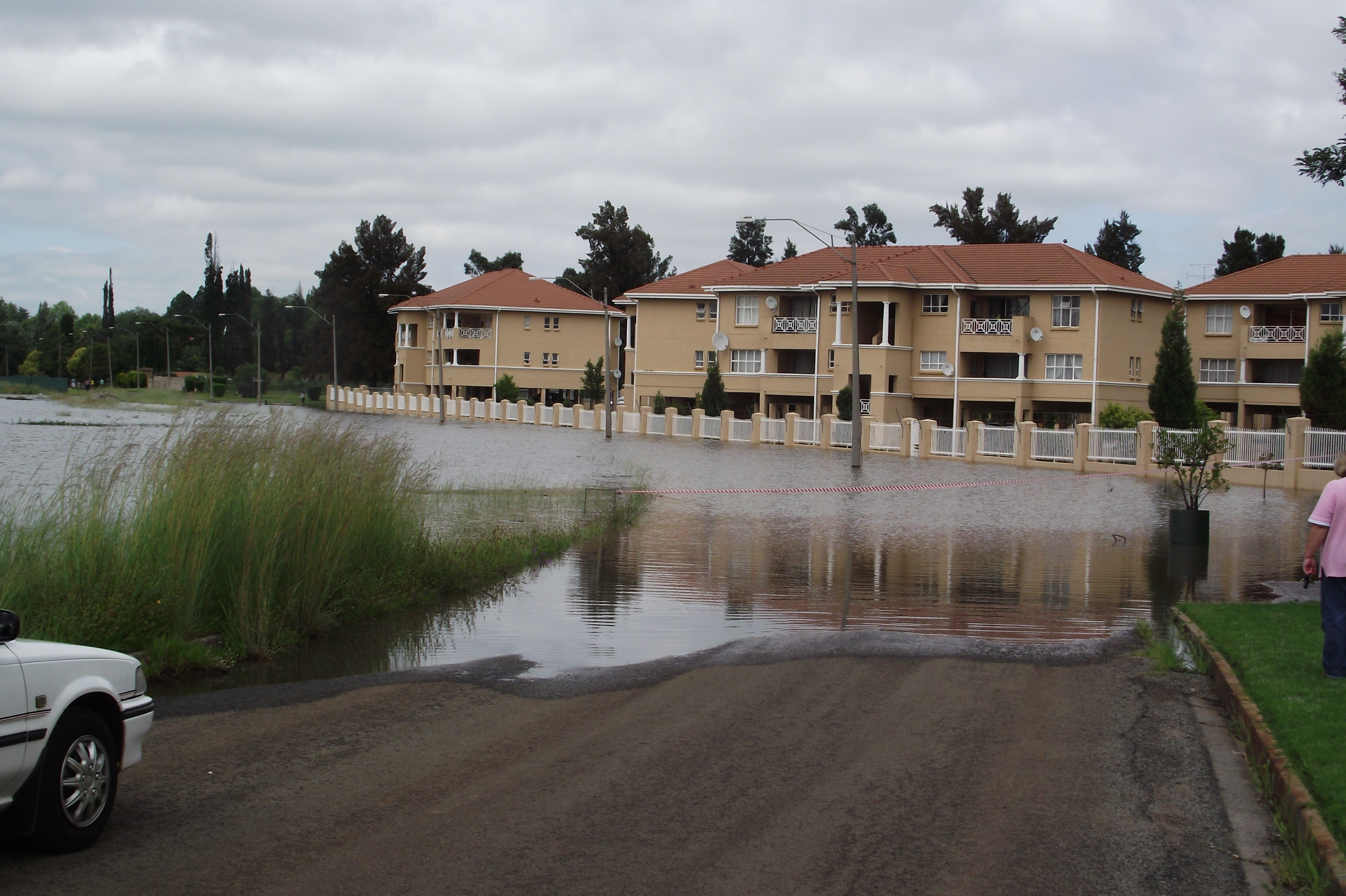
Vereeniging, South Africa

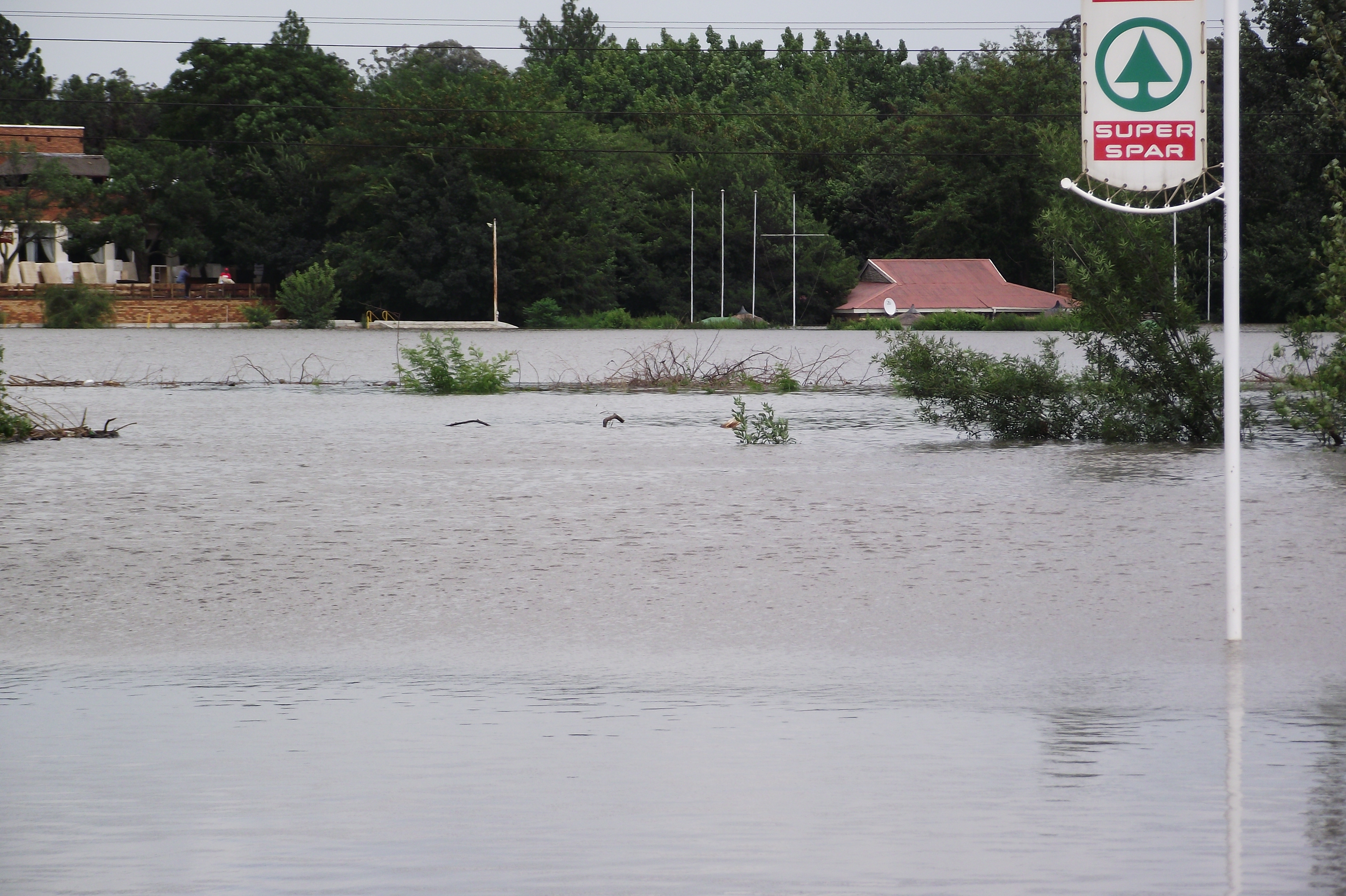
Barnyard theatre, Vereeniging, South Africa

== Mozambique ==
Throughout Mozambique, red alerts were issued along several of the country's rivers as they neared flood stage. An estimated 13,000 people have been evacuated and at least 13 are known to have been killed. Fearing a repeat of the 2000 Mozambique floods, residents living along the Limpopo River began evacuating on 19 January as the river rose to its alert level. In some areas, the river has topped its banks, flooding dozens of hectares of crops. According to Chokwe district administrator Alberto Libombo, the rise in the river was mostly attributed to increased discharges at dams upstream where heavy rains fell.

== Elsewhere ==
In Zimbabwe, some areas recorded their heaviest rainfall in over 30 years, leading to fears of deadly floods across the country. A flood-related bus crash killed four people and flooding in another location claimed another victim in Masvingo. The nation's Civil Protection Unit director Madzudzo Pawadyira urged that any residents living in low-lying areas evacuate to higher ground. Similarly heavy rains also affected portions of Zambia and Malawi; however, it is unknown if flooding has taken place in these areas.

In southern Botswana, thousands of people are threatened by the possibility of widespread flooding that could submerge entire villages. Two rivers, the Shoshong and Mpolonyane, have already burst their banks and have inundated nearby areas. Daily activity in Shoshong and Kalamare was disrupted as residents were faced with rising flood waters, forcing schools to close. Parts of Namibia were also faced with floods, but the government is taking extreme caution due to a recent flood, three years ago, which devastated parts of the country.
