= Great Iran Flood =

Natural disaster in Iran

The Great Iran Flood was a catastrophic flood event that took place on 17 August 1954 in Iran. It is one of the deadliest floods in history, with claims of from 2,000 to 10,000 fatalities. The National Oceanic and Atmospheric Administration ranked it one of the top global weather events of the 20th century.

== Deaths ==
At first, The New York Times, an American newspaper based in New York City, reported that 2,000 persons were presumed dead. Some later sources claim that as many as 10,000 died as a result of the flood. Most sources from the era, however, place the number of victims at around 2,000.
