= 2021 Maharashtra floods =

Floods in Maharashtra, India, July 2021

- The state of Maharashtra within India
- Date: 22 July 2021 – August 2021
- Cause: Heavy rainfall
- Deaths: 209
- Missing: 8
- Property damage: Rs4,000 crore (US$539 million)

A series of floods took place across the Indian State of Maharashtra in 2021. As of 28 July 2021, around 251 people have died and over 100 are still missing due to floods and landslides. 13 districts have been affected in western Maharashtra. Damage was calculated to be Rs4,000 crore (US$539 million).

The flood was part of a series of tightly clustered extreme weather events in July 2021, including extreme rain events in Henan, China and Europe and is part of an increase in rain events during the Indian monsoon season caused by climate change.

== History and climate change ==
Starting on 22 July 2021, Maharashtra saw heavy rainfall in many of its western districts. On 23 July 2021, NDTV reported that Maharashtra saw the highest in the month of July in 40 years.

Climate change could have played an important role in causing large-scale floods across Maharashtra. The observed data shows a three-fold rise in widespread extreme rainfall events across India, including those regions where the floods occurred. The local meteorological conditions showed the presence of a low so boring system in the Bay of Bengal, anchoring the monsoon westerlies blowing from the Arabian Sea. These westerlies brought in an anomalous amount of moisture from the warm Arabian Sea, releasing them as heavy-to-extreme rains across Maharashtra over a week. In April 2021, Potsdam Institute for Climate Impact Research reported about climate change heavily impacting the monsoon seasons in India.

== Impact and rescue operations ==
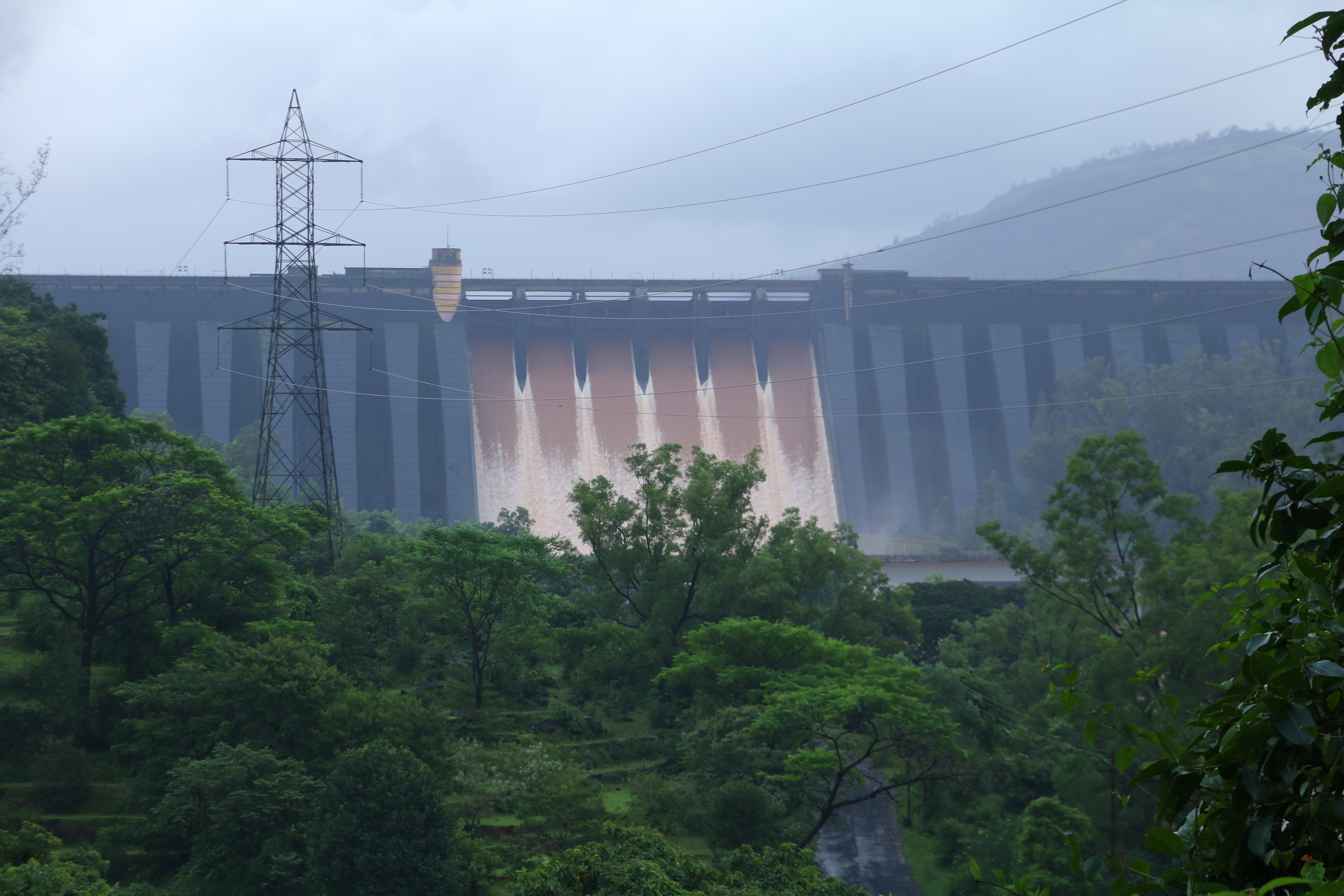
Water being released from Koyna Dam

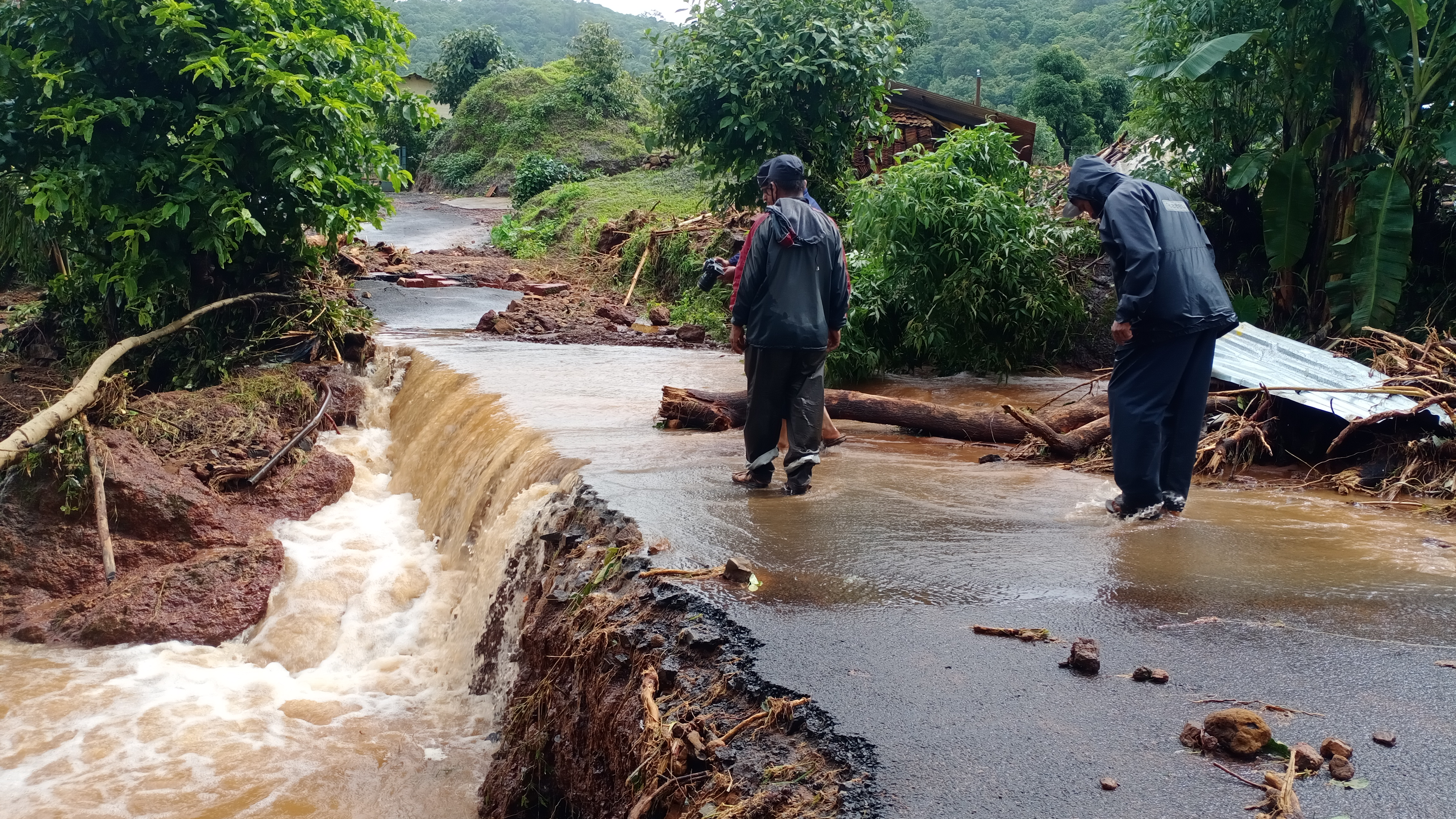
Road destroyed in floods near Satara

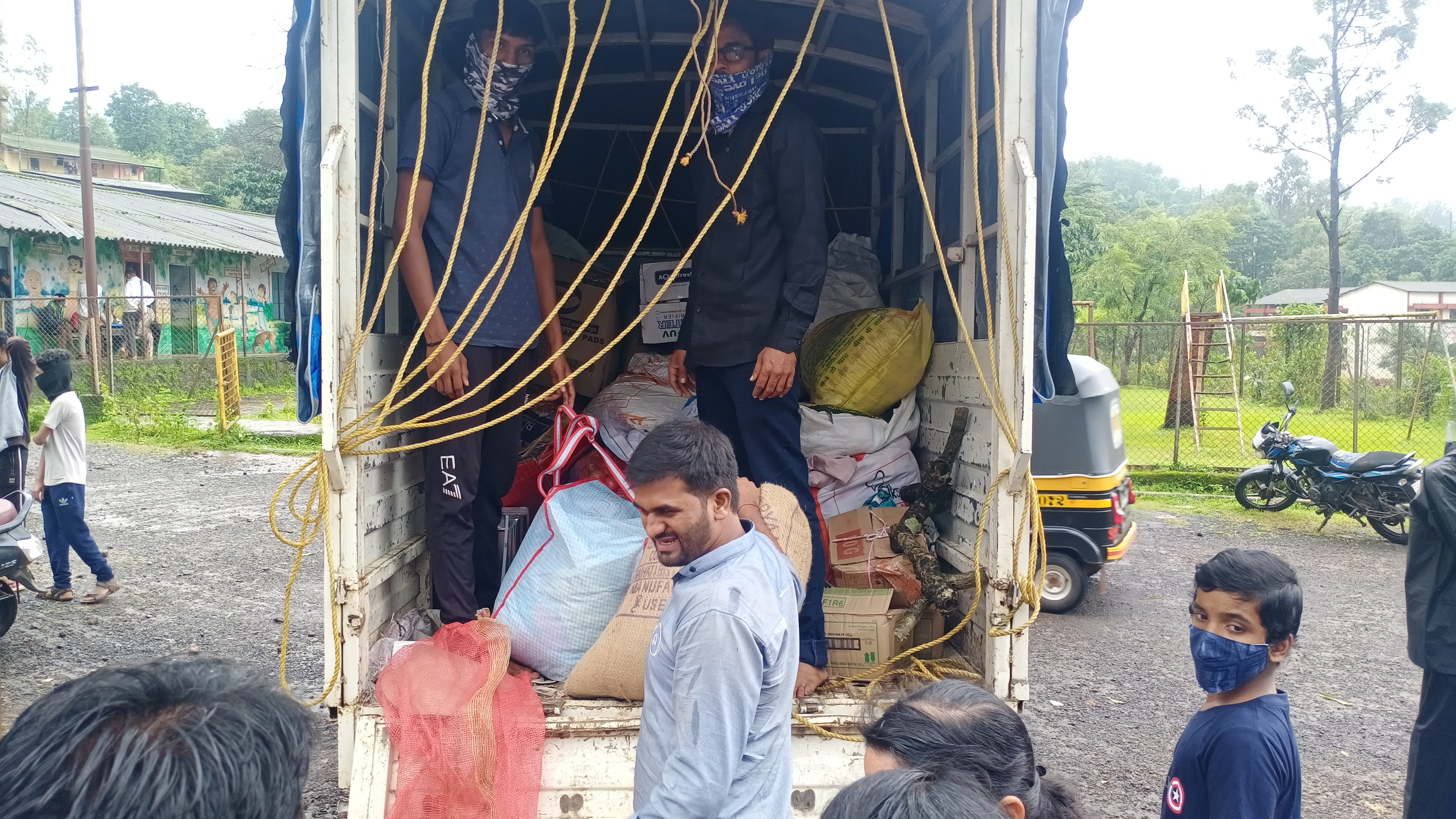
Food and other essential items being distributed by voluntary organization to affected people.

The most affected regions were the districts of Raigad, Ratnagiri, Sindhudurg, Satara, Sangli and Kolhapur. Due to heavy rains, more than 1,020 villages were affected in these districts. Over 375,000 people have been evacuated, of whom around 206,000 were from Sangli district and around 150,000 from Kolhapur district. There have been more than 28,700 poultry deaths and around 300 other animal deaths in Kolhapur, Sangli, Satara and Sindhudurg districts. Initial estimates state that over 2 lakh (200,000) hectares of crops have been damaged in the floods.

Various infrastructural facilities were impacted and damaged. Around 800 bridges have been submerged, preventing physical communications with various villages. The drinking water supply of around 700 villages was affected and the rainfall also caused damage to about 14,700 electric transformers, affecting the power supply to nearly 9.5 lakh (950,000) consumers. As of 28 July 2021, the power supply to about 6.5 lakh (650,000) consumers was restored through repairs of nearly 9500 transformers. Damage was calculated to be Rs4,000 crore (US$539 million).

Around 34 teams from National Disaster Response Force (NDRF) were deployed for rescue missions in various regions. The Central Government on 27 July 2021 declared financial aid of ₹700 crore (US$73 million). The Maharashtra state's MLAs of Bharatiya Janata Party also announced that they would donate one month's salary for relief support.

== See also ==
- 2021 Mumbai landslide
