= 2013 Argentina floods =

2013 natural disaster in northern Buenos Aires Province, Argentina

2013 Argentine floods
- Date: 1–3 April 2013
- Location: Greater Buenos Aires; Greater La Plata
- Deaths: 101

Between 1 and 3 April 2013, the northeastern section of Buenos Aires Province, Argentina, experienced several flash floods that claimed the lives of 101 people. Greater La Plata was hardest hit with 91 reported deaths, and Greater Buenos Aires reported 10 deaths. The flooding was the result of extremely heavy rainfall and is said to be the worst flooding in La Plata's history.

Three days of national mourning were declared on 3 April. Two days later, government benefits for flood victims were announced.

== Storm ==
On the evening of Monday, 1 April 2013, a severe storm moved into the northeast of Buenos Aires Province. It began to rain heavily, peaking between 3:00 AM and 5:30 AM. During the storm's peak, visibility was only 500 metres (1,600 ft). In total, the storm dumped between 160 and 190 mm (6.3 and 7.5 in) of rain on Buenos Aires, the heaviest April rainfall on record. Buenos Aires city typically averages 96 mm (3.8 in) of rain for the entire month of April. In nearby La Plata, the capital city of Buenos Aires Province, approximately 400 mm (16 in) of rain fell over a two-hour time span on Tuesday evening.

The heavy rainfall led to flash floods and widespread power outages. In Greater La Plata, an estimated 3,000 people were evacuated, many after waiting hours for rescue in trees and on roof tops of flooded homes. Half of the city lost power and vast portions were underwater. TV footage of the disaster showed people wading through waist-deep water and cars almost completely underwater. The city's oil refinery caught fire due to "an extraordinary accumulation of rainwater and power outages" and was shut down. Flood waters encircled the La Plata suburb of Tolosa, rendering 50 vehicles immobile. Santiago Martorelli, cabinet chief of La Plata partido (department), called the storm "a catastrophe without precedent."

In Buenos Aires, more than a quarter of a million people were without power by Wednesday. Key transportation routes were submerged, and mass transit services disabled. A local reporter described the situation in Buenos Aires: "A record torrential rainstorm unleashed all its might ... turning the city into a macabre version of Venice rather than the dry capital of Argentina."

Rain continued to fall throughout the region on 3 April, making the situation very bad.

== Consequences ==
In Buenos Aires city, power shortages lasted as long as 15 hours in at least 11 Barrios (neighborhoods), affecting 70,000 households at its peak. Two hospitals were among those who lost power in La Plata. Buenos Aires Underground and rail systems were halted or limited.

The Chief of Government of Buenos Aires (city mayor), Mauricio Macri, was on vacation at the time of the flood, and returned in the evening. The same situation was for La Plata's city mayor Pablo Bruera, who first falsely claimed that he was assisting the evacuated people during the floods. President Cristina Fernández de Kirchner visited the affected area on 3 April surveying the damage by helicopter and meeting with victims in Tolosa, Greater La Plata, where she was born and raised; and Barrio Mitre, a villa miseria (slum) in Buenos Aires city northside. Rescue efforts focused on finding victims still trapped in their homes to prevent further fatalities. Local charities sought donations of food, water, diapers and mattresses. Hepatitis shots were available at evacuation centers, and four mobile hospitals were set up to treat victims and distribute food and water.

At that time, at least 51 people were known to have died in Greater La Plata, and six deaths had been reported in Buenos Aires. Two additional deaths were reported in Greater Buenos Aires. Many victims died by drowning, while others were electrocuted by downed power lines (including a Metro worker who was electrocuted in Los Incas station). Many deaths in La Plata were not discovered until after the flood waters started to recede. "The bodies began to appear as the water subsided," said the Governor of Buenos Aires Province, Daniel Scioli. Numerous families lost all their possessions in the floods, while shopkeepers reported losses of their merchandise. Business losses were estimated at 530.6 million pesos (US$104 million). Schools and government offices were closed across La Plata. As of 4 April, there were reportedly still 20 people missing and 1,200 evacuated in La Plata. More than two months later, it was officially reported that 78 was the number of deaths in Greater La Plata.

Politicians were quick to blame one another for the disaster. The Minister of Federal Planning and Public Utilities, Julio de Vido, claimed that Buenos Aires city officials knew that the rains were coming and had failed to prepare for them. Macri, a vocal opponent of President Kirchner, accused the national government of preventing the city from getting World Bank loans to finance infrastructure improvements. According to official data, the government of the City of Buenos Aires Mauricio Macri had not implemented any development works in stormwater infrastructure, while supplementary building works related to Maldonado Stream had only progressed up to 14 percent of the total budget. Residents of Barrio Mitre blamed the drainage system of a large shopping mall built nearby in 2009 for the heavy damage in their area. On Wednesday afternoon and on Thursday morning, Kirchner met with Scioli to coordinate the rescue and emergency efforts in Greater La Plata. Fear remained high as reports of looting and clashes with police officers spread. The Argentine army mounted an industrial kitchen and ten field kitchens to prepare hot meals 8,000 and 1,500 cold rations per day.

Three days of national mourning were declared on 3 April. On 5 April, Kirchner announced government benefits for the victims, including doubled pensions for some 70,000 elderly people and for an estimated 16,000 families receiving five other social subsidies, free replacement ID cards, new car licenses, and low-cost housing loans.

== Causes ==
The general causes of the floods were the absence of drainage works, the urban development without environmental control and climate change.

As specific causes can be seen:

- Absence of waterworks. The drainage channels are not working at 100%. Even though they would not be sufficient at full capacity either.
- Climate change.
- Lack of environmental awareness. The residues clog the drains.
- Deforestation in the north areas of the country.
- The growth of surface of cement avoid the water to infiltrates into the ground.

According to a report based on official data that the Buenos Aires Government delivered each quarter, the Mayor of the city of Buenos Aires, Mauricio Macri, made no inversion in stormwater infrastructure development works, while works annexed to the Maldonado stream are only 14% of the authorized budget.

A report issued in August 2012 by the Buenos Aires audit indicated that the works to reduce flooding in the neighborhoods of Belgrano, Villa del Parque, Villa Ortuzar, Agronomía and Parque Chas had been paralyzed for 3 years.

== See also ==
- Climate of Argentina
