= 2022 Afghanistan floods =

Disaster in Afghanistan

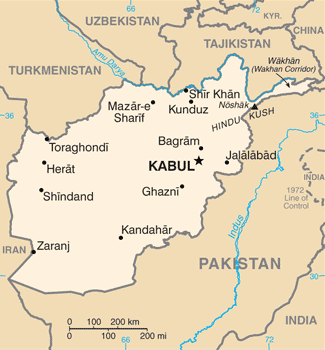
- Map of Afghanistan
- Date: May - August 2022
- Location: Most of Afghanistan
- Deaths: 670
- Property damage: US$2 billion

In May 2022, floods affected several parts of Afghanistan, killing 429 people. It was later reported the 182 people died due to flooding in August, as well as 40 people in July and 19 in June. From June to August, just as the country was recovering from an earthquake in Khost Province, floods hit again, killing 19 in June, 39 in July, and 182 others in August.

== Impact ==
Afghanistan has weathered drought and climate change, with low crop yields creating food shortages. This has exacerbated poverty caused by decades of war, a drop in foreign aid and the freezing of assets abroad after the Taliban came back and U.S.-led forces withdrew in August.

=== May ===
Flooding in May killed approximately 400 people. The rain and flooding was particularly severe in the provinces of Badghis, Faryab and Baghlan. Hassibullah Shekhani, head of communications and information at Afghanistan's National Disaster Management Authority, said 500 homes have been destroyed and 2,000 more damaged, 300 head of livestock killed and some 3,000 acres of crops damaged. He also stated that the International Committee of the Red Cross was helping and officials would approach other international organisations for help.

=== June–August ===
In June, 19 people died due to flooding. A further 39 others were killed in July. Flooding in August killed at least 182 people. Over 3,000 houses were damaged or destroyed due to the floods.

== See also ==
- 2022 South Asian floods
