= 2021 South Asian floods =

Natural disasters in Asia

- Map of South Asia
- Date: May - October 2021
- Location: Afghanistan, India, Bangladesh, Nepal, Pakistan, Sri Lanka
- Cause: Heavy monsoon rains
- Deaths: 1,287

After over 6,500 people died in flooding in 2020, monsoon floods hit South Asia again in 2021.

== Impact ==
=== Afghanistan ===
In early May, flooding in northern Afghanistan killed 37 people. Over 200 homes were damaged or destroyed.

From late July to August, 113 people died in flooding in Nuristan Province.

=== Bangladesh ===
Floods in July affected Cox’s Bazar, Bangladesh, killing 8 people, half of whom were children.

=== India ===
Floods hit the Indian state of Uttarakhand, causing an avalanche that killed 83 people and left 121 others missing.

Cyclone Tauktae affected southern India, killing 169 people. Shortly after, Cyclone Yaas killed a further 20 people.

Floods from July to August affected the state of Maharashtra, killing 251 people and leaving many more missing. Before the floods had occurred, the heavy rains had caused a landslide to destroy several homes in the city of Mumbai, killing 32 people.

In late July, heavy rain resulted in floods which killed 7 and left 19 missing in Jammu and Kashmir.

In Madhya Pradesh, 24 people were killed by floods in August.

Floods and landslides in September killed 180 people in Maharashtra.

In the states of Kerala and Uttarakhand, 47 people died in floods that occurred in October.

=== Nepal ===
In October, floods in western Nepal killed 88 people and left 30 others missing.

=== Pakistan ===
On 28 July 2021, heavy rains started after the cloudburst in Islamabad, Pakistan, caused a flood situation in many parts of the federal capital and killed two people. Several vehicles were swept away in the floods and water entered the basement of houses and plazas in Sector E-11, F-10 and D-12. The personal weather station in E-11/4 Islamabad recorded 116 mm of rain.

In September, floods have severely affected Pakistan's largest city, Karachi. At least 187 people died due to collapsing homes or from drowning in the city.

=== Sri Lanka ===
From May to November, Sri Lanka experienced major flooding. Four people died in May, 17 in June, and 20 in November.
