= 2013 Pakistan–Afghanistan floods =

Natural disaster in Pakistan and Afghanistan

2013 Pakistan-Afghanistan floods
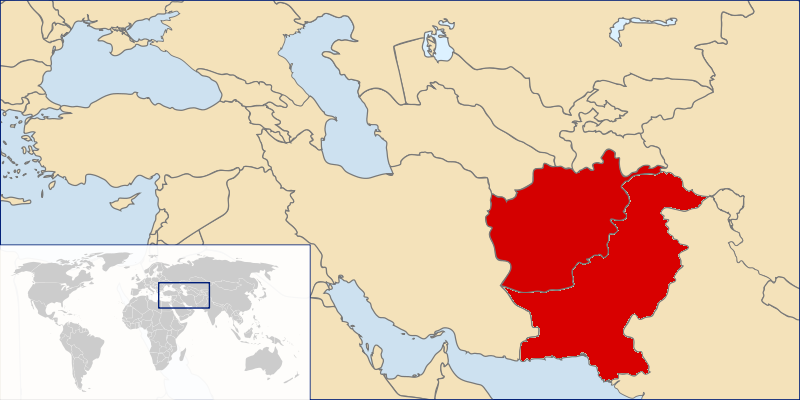
- Location of Afghanistan and Pakistan
- Date: August 2013
- Location: Pakistan; Afghanistan
- Deaths: 187

In August 2013, Pakistan and eastern Afghanistan experienced heavy rain that led to flash flooding. More than 180 died as a result of the floods.

== Background ==
Pakistan and eastern Afghanistan are frequently hit by flooding during the monsoon season. Since 2010, the region has suffered devastating floods that have left hundreds dead each year. The worst flooding in the past 80 years occurred in 2010, when flooding in Pakistan resulted in more than 1,700 deaths and widespread damage.

== Floods ==
Beginning 31 July 2013, Pakistan and parts of eastern Afghanistan experienced unusually heavy rainfall that caused widespread flash flooding. Flood waters began to recede on 5 August, but more heavy rain was expected later in August and September, the heart of monsoon season. All but one area of Khyber Pakhtunkhwa province in Pakistan was flood-free by 5 August, as the waters receded almost as quickly as they had risen.

== Damage and casualties ==
=== Pakistan ===
In Pakistan 80 deaths were reported as of 5 August; more than 30 other people were injured. The death toll rose to 83 as of 13 August with more than 94 injured. Casualties spanned the country, with the city of Karachi in south Pakistan being the hardest hit. In the northwest, 12 deaths were reported in the tribal region, eight in Khyber Pakhtunkhwa province, and three in the Kashmir region. Fast moving water washed away many houses in the region. In central Pakistan, 12 deaths were reported in Punjab province. In the south, eight deaths were reported in Sindh and ten in Baluchistan. Across Pakistan, more than 66,000 people were affected by the rain and resulting floods. Many of the deaths were the result of collapsed houses or by electrocution from downed power lines. In Karachi, poor neighbourhoods experienced waist-deep flooding and widespread power outages. Drainage and sewage systems in the city were clogged, causing the streets to fill with water.

=== Afghanistan ===
Mountainous regions in eastern and southeastern Afghanistan were the main areas hit by floods. In the rural Surobi District 61 people were killed, and around 500 mudbrick homes were washed away across more than a dozen villages. In the provinces of Khost and Nangarhar, flooding destroyed 50 houses and thousands of acres of farm land. 24 deaths were reported in the area. In the province of Nuristan at least 60 homes were destroyed across three districts, but no casualties were reported. On 10 August, at least 22 more people killed in the flash flood near Kabul As of 14 August death toll rises above 90 in the country.

== Reaction and relief efforts ==
Nawaz Sharif, Pakistan's Prime Minister, sent three cabinet ministers to survey affected areas. National Disaster Management Authority chief Muhammad Saeed Aleem blamed global climate change for the floods. In eastern Pakistan, 100 trucks carrying relief supplies were dispatched, and 30 medical camps were established. Officials in Karachi said it would take at least two days to clean up after the floods receded. The army was deployed to Karachi where army engineers worked to pump out the blocked drainage systems.

Officials in Afghanistan said they were unable to deliver aid to some hard hit areas due to the access roads being controlled by the Taliban insurgents.

On 5 August, United Nations spokesperson Martin Nesirky said UN and its humanitarian partners are ready help Afghanistan and Pakistan if required.

== See also ==
- List of floods in Pakistan
