= 2022 South Asian floods =

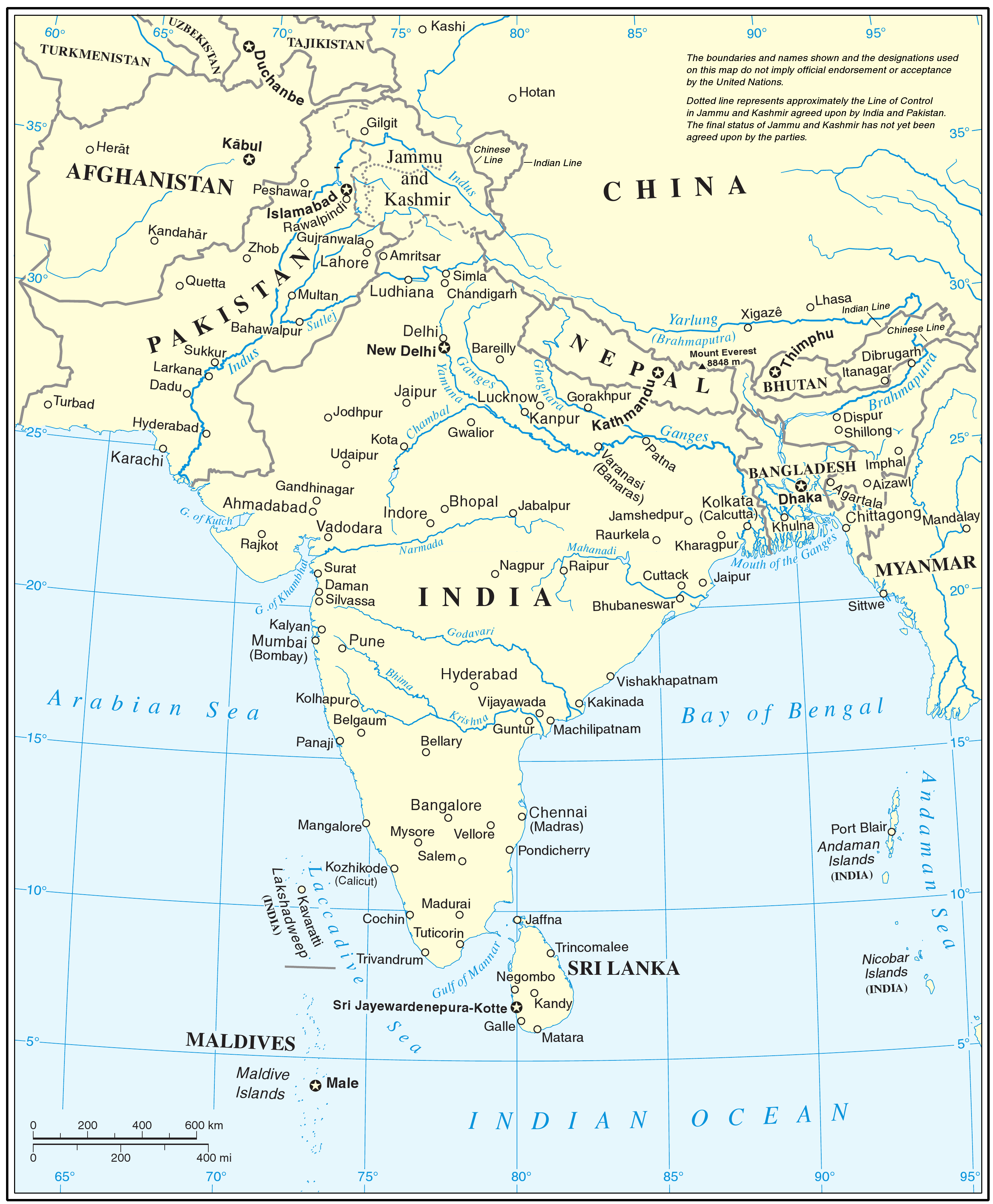
- UN map of South Asia
- Date: January - October 2022
- Location: Afghanistan, Bangladesh, India, Nepal, Pakistan, Sri Lanka
- Cause: Heavy monsoon rains
- Deaths: 4,725
- Property damage: US$42+ billion

From January to October 2022, excessive rainfall and widespread monsoon flooding occurred in the South Asian countries of Afghanistan, Bangladesh, India, Nepal, Pakistan, and Sri Lanka. It has become the region's deadliest floods since 2020, with over 4,700 people dead.

== Background ==
Monsoons hit South Asia every year, mostly between June and September. Every year, floods affect the Indian subcontinent, collapsing buildings and causing landslides. Climate change in South Asia has exacerbated these storms.

== Countries affected ==
=== Pakistan ===
Floods in Khyber Pakhtunkhwa killed eight people in January, however from June 2022, floods affected most of Pakistan, affecting around 33 million people, or 12% of the country's population. Over two million houses were damaged or destroyed by flooding, and over US$40 billion worth of damage has been caused. At least 1,760 people were killed by flooding, most of them in the provinces of Sindh, Balochistan, Khyber Pakhtunkhwa, and Punjab.

=== Afghanistan ===
In May 2022, floods affected several parts of Afghanistan, killing 429 people. It was later reported the 182 people died due to flooding in August, as well as 40 people in July and 19 in June. From June to August, just as the country was recovering from an earthquake in Khost Province, floods hit again, killing 19 in June, 39 in July, and 182 others in August.

=== India ===
In late May, floods have affected over 4,000 villages in the Indian states of Assam and Bihar, killing at least 186 people. Floods continued to affect Assam in June, killing a further 200 people. From June to July, floods in Maharashtra killed 105 people. From June to August, floods have also affected the northwest of the country, killing at least 40 and leaving 13 others missing in the Indian state of Uttarakhand while 276 others died in Himachal Pradesh. Floods have also affected the state of Odisha, killing six. In Gujarat, floods have killed at least 61 since June. On 30 June, 58 people died, 3 went missing, and 18 were injured after a landslide occurred in the Noney District of Manipur. On 8 July, 16 people died while 40 were missing after floods during the 2022 Amarnath Yatra in Jammu and Kashmir. From 18 to 23 August, a tropical storm caused floods to affect the coast of eastern India, killing 14 people. In September, hundreds of homes were damaged and 12 people died in floods in Uttar Pradesh, including nine from a collapsing wall. Floods in October killed at least 18 people. In total, 2,035 people were killed by flooding in India throughout 2022.

=== Bangladesh ===
Since 17 May, floods have affected parts of Bangladesh. At least 141 people were killed, most of them in the Sylhet Division. In October, Cyclone Sitrang caused an additional 35 fatalities.

=== Nepal ===
Floods and landslides in the first nine months of 2022 have killed at least 70 people in Nepal. On 16 September, a landslide killed 22 people and left 10 missing in Achham District. At least 46 people were killed and 22 were left missing by heavy flooding in October, with Karnali Province being the worst affected.

=== Sri Lanka ===
Three deaths have been reported due to floods in Sri Lanka in June, and hundreds of homes had been damaged. In October, an additional three deaths occurred and over 210 houses were damaged or destroyed.
