= 2014 Baghlan floods =

Natural disaster in Afghanistan

- Date: 6 June 2014
- Location: Baghlan, Afghanistan
- Deaths: 73-200
- Missing: 200

On 6 June 2014, a flash flood took place in Baghlan, Afghanistan, killing 73-200 people and leaving 200 missing.

== Background ==
Afghanistan has an annual rainy season in the north, and the building materials of the houses situated there are "flimsy", consisting of mud.

== Floods ==
The flooding destroyed infrastructure such as bridges and roads, killed 73, and left 200 missing. The flood came after recent flooding in northern Afghanistan. The event killed 65 The flash flood came in the aftermath of powerful winds, heavy rain, and hail.

== Aftermath ==
Chief of Baghlan police Aminullah Amarkhel gave the location as four villages in Guzargah-e-Nur. Helicopters were unable to land due to the floods, and were unable to deliver needed drinking water, medicine, and food. The Guzargah-e-Nur government requested emergency assistance from the federal government. Two military helicopters belonging to the Afghan army were sent to render aid. The flooding meant that thousands of villagers had to move away from their homes after 2,000 homes were destroyed by floodwater. The police estimate of 54 rose to 81, a separate report gave 74 casualties, and the BBC gave a figure of 73. Bodies could afterwards be seen in the river.

Hundreds of houses have damaged or destroyed in Yahya, Jeryan, Zeh Wali, Dahte Khasa, Mir Khel, Yahood, Dahnae Gharoo, Deh Qandee, Koree Naw, Jar Ab, Dashte Khakaye Payeen, Khasaye Payeen villages in Guzargahi Nur district according to the Baghlan Provincial Governor and the ANDMA (Afghanistan National Disasters Management Authority) director. Affected people have been taken in by the local community in surrounding villages ...

Relief supplies are on standby to be transported to the district once the road is cleared. Based on the current estimate from the contractors, the first road will not be open before 13 June 2014 ...

Two teams of contractors are working with excavators to open the blocked roads from both Pul-e-Khumri and Taloqan provincial capitals. Two excavators are working in Eshkasmesh District of Takhar Province to open the road to Guzargah-e-Nur district.
