= 2020 South Asian floods =

Natural disasters in South Asia

- Map of South Asia
- Date: May - October 2020
- Location: Afghanistan, India, Bangladesh, Nepal, Pakistan, Sri Lanka
- Cause: Heavy monsoon rains
- Deaths: 6,511
- Property damage: $105 billion USD

In 2020, floods severely affected South Asia due to heavy monsoon rains. The floods caused $105 billion USD of damage ($88.5 billion in India, $15 billion in Sri Lanka, and $1.5 billion in Pakistan), making them the costliest floods in modern history, and the ninth costliest disaster of all time. In addition there were 6,511 fatalities, the most reported in a flood since Cyclone Sidr in 2007. Floods continued in 2021 and 2022.

== Impact ==
=== Afghanistan ===
In April, floods killed at least 11 people and damaged around 700 houses. Between July and August, floods had affected around half of Afghanistan, killing 190 people and damaged around 2,000 homes.

=== Bangladesh ===
In May, Cyclone Amphan caused 20 deaths in Bangladesh. In July, floods struck again, affecting 3.3 million people, and killing 260 more people.

=== India ===
Cyclone Amphan killed at least 86 people in West Bengal, India. From July to October, over 5,000 people died in flooding.

=== Nepal ===
From June to September, floods in Nepal killed at least 401 people. The Kathmandu Post reported that the floods were some of the worst in the country’s history.

=== Pakistan ===
At least 410 people died in floods in Pakistan. Over 310,000 homes were damaged by flood water, causing $1.5 billion USD of damage.

=== Sri Lanka ===
At least 133 people have died when floods damaged 3 million homes and caused $15 billion USD in damages.
