= Himalayan flood =

Himalayan flood may refer to these floods in the Himalayas:

- 2012 Himalayan flash floods, in northern India
- 2023 Himalayan floods, in Himachal Pradesh and other regions of the Indian Himalayas
- Uttarakhand flood (disambiguation), floods in a Himalayan state of India
