= Floods of 2021 =

2021 saw some of the most extreme flooding on record, in large part driven by climate change. The insurance industry analysis group Swiss RE found that 31% of global insurance losses were from flooding, and that nearly a fifth of the economic damage from natural disasters was uninsured.

== Significant floods ==
=== Australia ===
Extreme rainfall on the east coast of Australia beginning on 18 March 2021 led to widespread flooding in New South Wales, affecting regions from the North Coast to the Sydney metropolitan area in the south. Suburbs of Sydney experienced the worst flooding in 60 years, and the events were described by NSW Premier Gladys Berejiklian as "one in 100-year" flooding. Far-southeast communities in Queensland were also affected by flooding and heavy rainfall, though to a lesser extent than those in New South Wales.

The Australian government declared many parts of the east coast a natural disaster zone after the flooding rains forced 18,000 people to evacuate, in addition to over 1,000 flood rescues. Described as a "prolonged event" by Berejiklian and "dangerous and threatening" by the Bureau of Meteorology, the floods extended from the coastal towns of Taree and Kempsey on Thursday, 18 March, to the populated suburbs of western Sydney by Friday and Saturday.

The floods occurred less than 18 months after Australia was affected by the Black Summer bushfires, impacting many towns still recovering from the previous disaster.

=== China ===
China's Henan Province experienced flooding between 17 and 31 July 2021 as a result of heavy rainfall. On July 20, Zhengzhou, the provincial capital, recorded 201.9 millimetres (7.95 in) of rainfall within an hour, the highest ever figure recorded since measurements began in 1951. (Note: 201.9 millimetres (7.95 in) is a new hourly rainfall record in Zhengzhou since measurements were established. Many media outlets claimed the figure as being the highest in the country's history, although the claim is disputed as Xiachen (下陈), Henan recorded 218.1 millimetres (8.59 in) of rainfall during 1975 while Dashicao (大石槽), Shaanxi recorded 252 millimetres (9.9 in) of rainfall on 20 June 1981.) On 2 August 2021, provincial authorities reported 302 deaths (292 in Zhengzhou), and over 50 missing people. Later, government investigations led to conclude that provincial officials had “deliberately impeded and withheld reports of up to 139 cases”, and that the full death toll was 398. The floods caused the evacuation of 815,000 people, and affected 14.5 million people around the province. The intensity of the floods was believed to have been amplified by extreme weather caused by climate change.

=== Europe ===
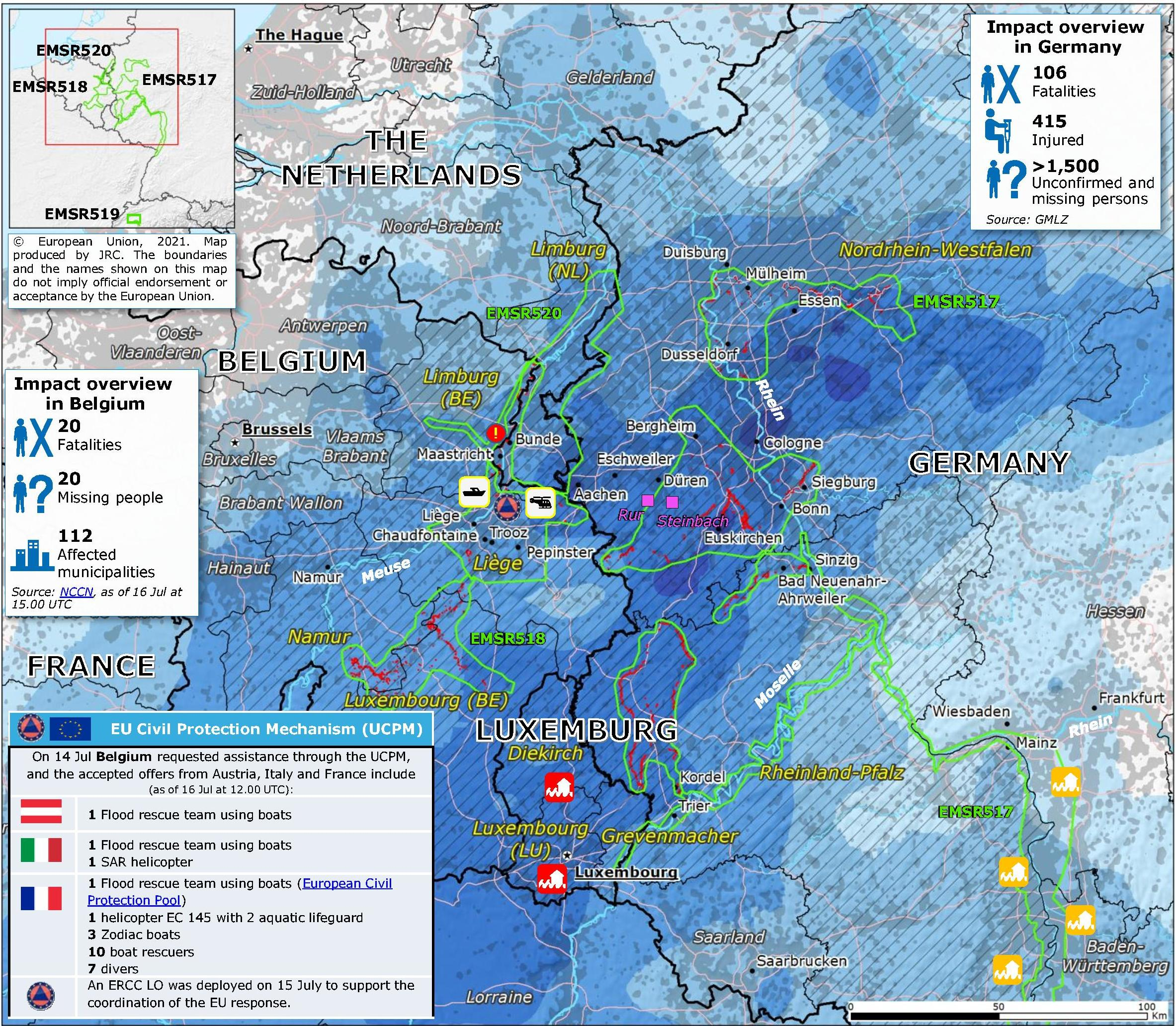
Areas affected, EU Emergency Response Coordination Centre (ERCC)

In July 2021, several European countries were affected by severe floods. Some were catastrophic, causing deaths and widespread damage. The floods started in the United Kingdom as flash floods causing some property damage and inconvenience. Later floods affected several river basins across Europe including Austria, Belgium, Croatia, Germany, Italy, Luxembourg, the Netherlands, and Switzerland. At least 243 people died in the floods, including 196 in Germany, 39 in Belgium, two in Romania, one in Italy and one in Austria.

Belgian Minister of Home Affairs Annelies Verlinden described the events as "one of the greatest natural disasters our country has ever known." German minister-president Malu Dreyer of the Rhineland-Palatinate state called the floods "devastating". In addition to the confirmed fatalities, the flooding led to widespread power outages, forced evacuations and damage to infrastructure and agriculture in the affected areas. The damage to infrastructure was especially severe in Belgium and Germany. The floods are estimated to have cost at least €2 billion (US$2.35 billion) in insured losses, with the total damage costs being much higher, amounted to be €46 billion (US$54 billion). In the aftermath, scientists, activists and reporters all highlighted the connection to global trends in extreme weather, especially more frequent heavy rainfall caused by climate change.

=== India ===
==== Uttarakhand ====
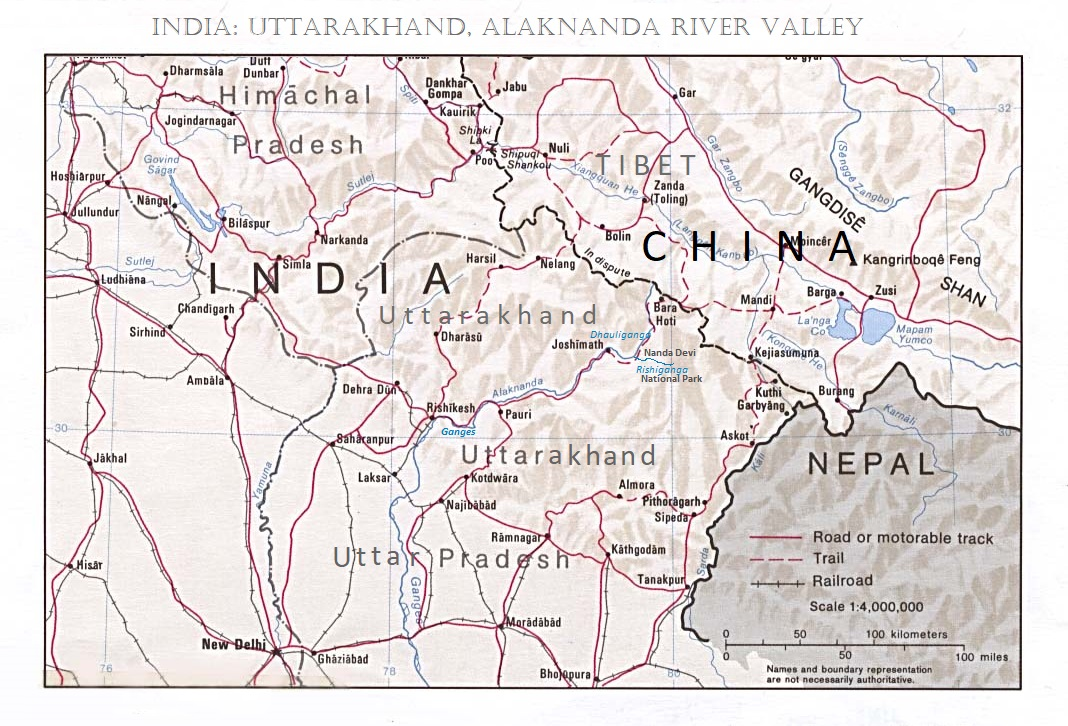
Map 1: The Alaknanda, Dhauliganga, and Rishganga river valleys, and the Nanda Devi National Park in the state of Uttarakhand

The 2021 Uttarakhand flood, also known as the Chamoli disaster, began on 7 February 2021 in the environs of the Nanda Devi National Park, a UNESCO World Heritage Site in the outer Garhwal Himalayas in Uttarakhand state, India (Maps 1 and 2). It was caused by a large rock and ice avalanche consisting of material dislodged from Ronti peak. It caused flooding in the Chamoli district, most notably in the Rishiganga river, the Dhauliganga river, and in turn the Alaknanda—the major headstream of the Ganges (Maps 2 and 3). The disaster left around 300 killed or missing. Most were workers at the Tapovan dam site.

==== South India ====
The 2021 South India floods are a series of floods associated with Depression BOB 05 and a low pressure system that caused widespread disruption across the Indian states of Tamil Nadu, Andhra Pradesh, and the nearby Sri Lanka. The rainfall started on 1 November in Tamil Nadu. The flooding was caused by extremely heavy downpours from BOB 05, killing at least 41 people across India and Sri Lanka.

=== Malaysia ===
==== 20–21 ====
2020–2021 Malaysian floods is an event when several states in Malaysia were flooded in late 2020 and early 2021. Floods caused about tens of thousands of people to be evacuated to evacuation centers. The floods also claimed several lives, causing almost all types of land transport in the areas affected by the floods to be cut off.

==== 21–22 ====
On 16 December 2021, a tropical depression made landfall on the eastern coast of Peninsular Malaysia, bringing torrential downpours throughout the peninsula for three days. The resulting floods affected eight states across the peninsula, and left at least 54 dead and 2 missing. During its furthest extent, it caused the concurrent displacement of more than 71,000 residents, and have affected over 125,000 people overall.

Declared by government officials as a "once in a century" disaster, it is the worst flood in the country in terms of displaced residents since the 2014–2015 Malaysia floods. It has also been historically compared with the 1971 Kuala Lumpur floods. It is the deadliest tropical cyclone-related disaster to hit Malaysia since Tropical Storm Greg of 1996, which killed 238 people and left 102 more missing.

Record-high precipitations were measured at weather stations at Selangor and Kuala Lumpur. Widespread damages were reported in the states of Selangor and Pahang, especially the district of Hulu Langat and the city of Shah Alam. The Malaysian government has suffered criticism over its delayed response and apathy towards the disaster. Scientists, climate activists, and the media have largely made connections of this disaster as an example of extreme weather attributed to climate change.

=== North America ===
==== Hawaii ====
The March 2021 Hawaii floods was a devastating series of floods that caused a tremendous amount of damage to the U.S state of Hawaii. The heavy rain started on March 7, 2021, and flooded the Kaupakalua Dam. It was reported that the dam flooded due to deficiencies, and as a result, it was decommissioned in 2022. One person is currently missing from the floods, and at least a half dozen homes were heavily damaged or destroyed in the flooding, which also destroyed Peahi Bridge and heavily damaged Kaupakalua Bridge. More than 1,300 customers in Haiku were without power at 6:30 a.m. Tuesday HST.

==== Pacific Northwest ====
The 2021 Pacific Northwest floods were a series of floods that affected British Columbia, Canada, and parts of neighboring Washington state in the United States. The flooding and numerous mass wasting events were caused by a Pineapple Express, a type of atmospheric river, which brought heavy rain to parts of southern British Columbia and northwestern United States. The natural disaster prompted a state of emergency for the province of British Columbia.

Of particular concern in southern British Columbia was the severe short-term and long-term disruption of the transportation corridor linking the coastal city of Vancouver, Canada's largest port, to the Fraser Valley, the rest of British Columbia and the rest of Canada. The Fraser Valley, which is heavily populated, is responsible for most of the agricultural production in the province, with limited ability to feed farm animals in the absence of rail service. The Fraser Valley was particularly hard hit, as all major routes westward to Vancouver and eastward toward Alberta were impacted. Alternative routes into northern BC and southbound into Washington state are limited by the mountainous topography. The heavily used rail links of the Canadian National Railway (CN) and Canadian Pacific Railway (CP) were both disrupted, as well as all highways that connect the Lower Mainland with the rest of the province.

The British Columbia Minister of Public Safety, Mike Farnworth, issued a statement that the military deployment ended on December 17 after a month of aid. Conditions had improved enough for the reconstruction be managed by contractors, non-governmental organizations and a dedicated contingent from the region's wildland fire management service.

On December 10, the Insurance Bureau of Canada announced that the flooding cost at least $CDN 450 million in insured damage, making it the costliest natural disaster in British Columbia history. However, this amount did not include damage to infrastructure and other uninsured property. In particular, in the Sumas Prairie of the Abbotsford area, more than 600,000 farm animals perished in the floods. The reinsurer Aon issued a statement on December 17, 2021 claiming that the economic damage would amount to more than US$ 2 billion. According to the annual report of the NGO Christian Aid, issued December 26, the damages could amount up to US$ 7.5 billion.

== See also ==
- Weather of 2021
- Tropical cyclones in 2021
