= Floods in India =

Most disastrous floods occurred in different parts of India

This is a list of notable recorded floods that have occurred in India. Floods are the most common natural disaster in India. The heaviest southwest, the Brahmaputra, and other rivers to distend their banks, often flooding surrounding areas.

== In the 20th century ==
- In 1923, Lucknow was one of the earliest recorded floods in the city's history. It was caused by heavy rainfall in the monsoon season, which made the Gomti River overflow its banks and inundate many parts of the city. The flood affected the old city, the civil lines, and the cantonment areas. It damaged property, crops, and infrastructure, and forced many people to take shelter in higher places. The flood also disrupted the communication and transportation systems, and posed a threat to public health and safety.
- In October 1943, Madras (now Chennai) saw the worst flood to hit the city. Flood occurred due to excessive rains that lasted for 6 days and overflowed Coovum and the Adyar rivers. Damage caused to life and property was immense. However, estimate figure is unknown. The flood left thousands of people homeless.
- On 17 October 1960, the 1960 Lucknow flood was a natural disaster that occurred in the city of Lucknow, the capital of Uttar Pradesh, India, in October 1960. It was caused by the overflow of the Gomti River, a tributary of the Ganges River, after heavy rainfall in the Himalayan region. The flood submerged almost half of the city under several feet of water, killing more than 16 people and making thousands homeless on 13 October 1960. It was one of the worst floods in Lucknow's history. The flood affected various parts of the city, including the old city, the civil lines, the cantonment, and the main shopping centre. It also caused damage to the electricity supply, the zoological gardens, and many historical monuments. Elephants, bicycle rickshaws, and boats were used as means of transport in the flooded areas. The government deployed army units and helicopters to rescue the marooned people and provide relief materials. The water level dropped very slowly and no estimate was made of the total damage.
- On 8 September 1971, a major flood struck Lucknow, the capital of Uttar Pradesh, causing widespread damage and loss. It was caused by two breaches in the embankment of the Gomti River, which flows through Lucknow before joining the Ganges River. The breaches were caused by the high water level of the river, which was six feet (about two metres) above the danger mark due to heavy rainfall in the monsoon season. The flood submerged many parts of the city under three or four feet (one to 1.2 metres) of water, affecting the main shopping area, some fashionable residential areas, and the zoological gardens. The flood also disrupted the electricity supply, the communication and transportation systems, and the public health and safety. At least 13 deaths due to drowning were reported from Uttar Pradesh on September 7, taking the death toll in two months of rains and flooding in the state to 268. In Lucknow itself, a quarter of the city's area was under water on September 8.
- On 11 August 1979, the Machchhu-2 dam situated on the Machchhu River burst, thus flooding the town of Morbi in the Rajkot district of Gujarat. Exact figure of loss of lives is unknown, but it is estimated between 1800 and 2500 people.
- In 1987, Bihar state of India witnessed one of its worst floods till then. Flood occurred due to overflow of the Koshi river; which claimed lives of 1,399 humans, 302 animals and public property worth INR ₹68 billion (US$710 million).
- In 1988, Punjab experienced its first flood when all the rivers in Punjab overflowed.
- In July 1993, flash floods killed 530 people across the seven to eight states of India.

== In the 21st century ==
- Heavy rains across the state of Maharashtra, including large areas of the metropolis Mumbai which received 567 ( inches) alone on 26 July 2005 killed at least 1,094 people. The day is still remembered as the day Mumbai came to a standstill, as the city faced worst ever rain. Mumbai International Airport remained closed for 30 hours, Mumbai-Pune Expressway was closed for 24 hours with public property loss was estimated at ₹550 crore (US$57 million).
- The 2008 Lucknow flood was a natural disaster that occurred in Lucknow, the capital of Uttar Pradesh, India, in August 2008. It was caused by the overflow of the Gomti River after heavy rainfall in the monsoon season. The flood submerged several parts of the city, affecting more than 100,000 people and killing at least 15. The flood also damaged property, crops, and infrastructure. The state government declared Lucknow as one of the 11 districts affected by floods and deployed army units and helicopters to rescue and provide relief to the affected people. The rainfall increased the water level of the Gomti River, which rose above the danger mark of 8.5 metres (28 ft) at Lucknow. The river also received water from its tributaries, such as Sai, Kathana, and Kukrail. The flood situation was worsened by the inadequate drainage system of the city, which could not cope with the runoff from the urban areas. The encroachment of floodplains and wetlands by illegal constructions also reduced the natural capacity of the river to absorb excess water. The flood affected various parts of Lucknow, especially the low-lying areas along the banks of the Gomti River. The worst-hit areas were Daliganj, Nishatganj, Aminabad, Chowk, Thakurganj, Alambagh, Rajajipuram, and Indira Nagar. The flood water entered many houses, shops, offices, schools, hospitals, and religious places, forcing people to evacuate or take shelter on rooftops or higher grounds. The flood also disrupted the power supply, water supply, communication, and transportation systems in the city. Many roads and bridges were damaged or submerged by the flood water, making them impassable for vehicles and pedestrians. The flood also posed a threat to public health and safety due to water-borne diseases and electrocution.
- June 2013 North Indian floods: Heavy rain due to a burst of a cloud caused severe floods and landslides on the North Indian states, mainly Uttarakhand and nearby states. More than 5,700 people were presumed dead.
- June 2015 Gujarat flood: Heavy rain in June 2015 resulted in widespread flood in Saurashtra region of Gujarat resulting in more than 70 deaths. The wild life of Gir Forest National Park and adjoining area was also affected.
- July 2015 Gujarat flood: Heavy rain in July 2015 resulted in widespread flood in north Gujarat resulting in more than 70 deaths.
- 2015 South Indian floods: Heavy rain in Nov-Dec 2015 resulted in flooding of Adyar, Cooum rivers in Chennai, Tamil Nadu resulting in financial loss and human lives.
- 2016 Assam floods: Heavy rains in July–August resulted in floods affecting 1.8 million people and flooding the Kaziranga National Park killing around 200 wild animals.
- 2017 Gujarat flood: Following heavy rain in July 2017, Gujarat state of India was affected by the severe flood resulting in more than 200 deaths.
- August 2018 Kerala Flood: Following high rain in late August 2018 and heavy Monsoon rainfall from August 8, 2018, severe flooding affected the Indian state of Kerala resulting over 445 deaths.
- 2019 India floods including 2019 Kerala floods: Following high rain in late July and early August 2019, series of floods that affected over nine states in India. The states of Kerala, Madhya Pradesh, Karnataka, Maharashtra and Gujarat were the most severely affected.
- Brahmaputra floods
- 2020 Assam floods
- 2020 Hyderabad floods, flash flood in Hyderabad in October 2020 that caused 98 fatalities, a part of the 2020 North Indian Ocean cyclone season
- 2021 Uttarakhand flood, flood in Uttarakhand in February 2021 caused by an avalanche from Ronti peak
- 2021 Maharashtra floods, widespread flooding in Mahad and Chiplun on 22 July 2021 caused by exceptionally heavy rainfall.
- 2022 Assam floods, heavy flooding in Assam State in May 2022.
- 2022 Balrampur floods after heavy rains, with over 1300 villages affected
- 2023 North India floods after heavy rainfall in North Indian states.
- 2023 Himalayan floods occurred after heavy rain caused flooding and landslides, killing at least 50 people.
- 2023 Chennai floods, heaving flooding in Chennai in December 2023 due to Cyclone Michaung.
- 2023 Thoothukkudi-Tirunelveli floods, heaving flooding in Thoothukkudi and Tirunelveli districts in December 2023 due to heavy rainfall.
- 2024 Wayanad floods occurred after heavy rain caused flooding and landslides, killing at least 123 people.
- 2024 Andhra Pradesh and Telangana floods occurred after heavy rain caused flooding and landslides, when 27 people were killed.
- 2025 Uttarakhand flash flood occurred after heavy rain caused flooding and landslides, killing at least 5 people and 50+ missing.

== Climate change ==
Climate change is said to have in part caused (but may also be a natural evolution of earth's cycle) large-scale floods across central India, including the Mumbai floods of 2006 and 2017. During 1901–2015, there has been a three-fold rise in widespread extreme rainfall events across central and northern India – Gujarat, Maharashtra, Madhya Pradesh, Chhattisgarh, Telangana, Odisha, Jharkhand, Assam and parts of Western Ghats – Goa, north Karnataka and South Kerala. The rising number of extreme rain events are attributed to an increase in the fluctuations of the monsoon westerly winds, due to increased warming in the Arabian Sea. This results in occasional surges of moisture transport from the Arabian Sea to the subcontinent, resulting in heavy rains lasting for 2–3 days, and spread over a region large enough to cause floods.

== See also ==
- List of floods
- List of deadliest floods
- Brahmaputra floods
