= Chamoli disaster =

The Chamoli disaster may refer to these disasters in Chamoli, Uttarakhand, India:

- The 1999 Chamoli earthquake
- The 2012 Himalayan flash floods
- The 2021 Uttarakhand flood
