= Joshimath =

Joshimath Jyotirmath
- Town
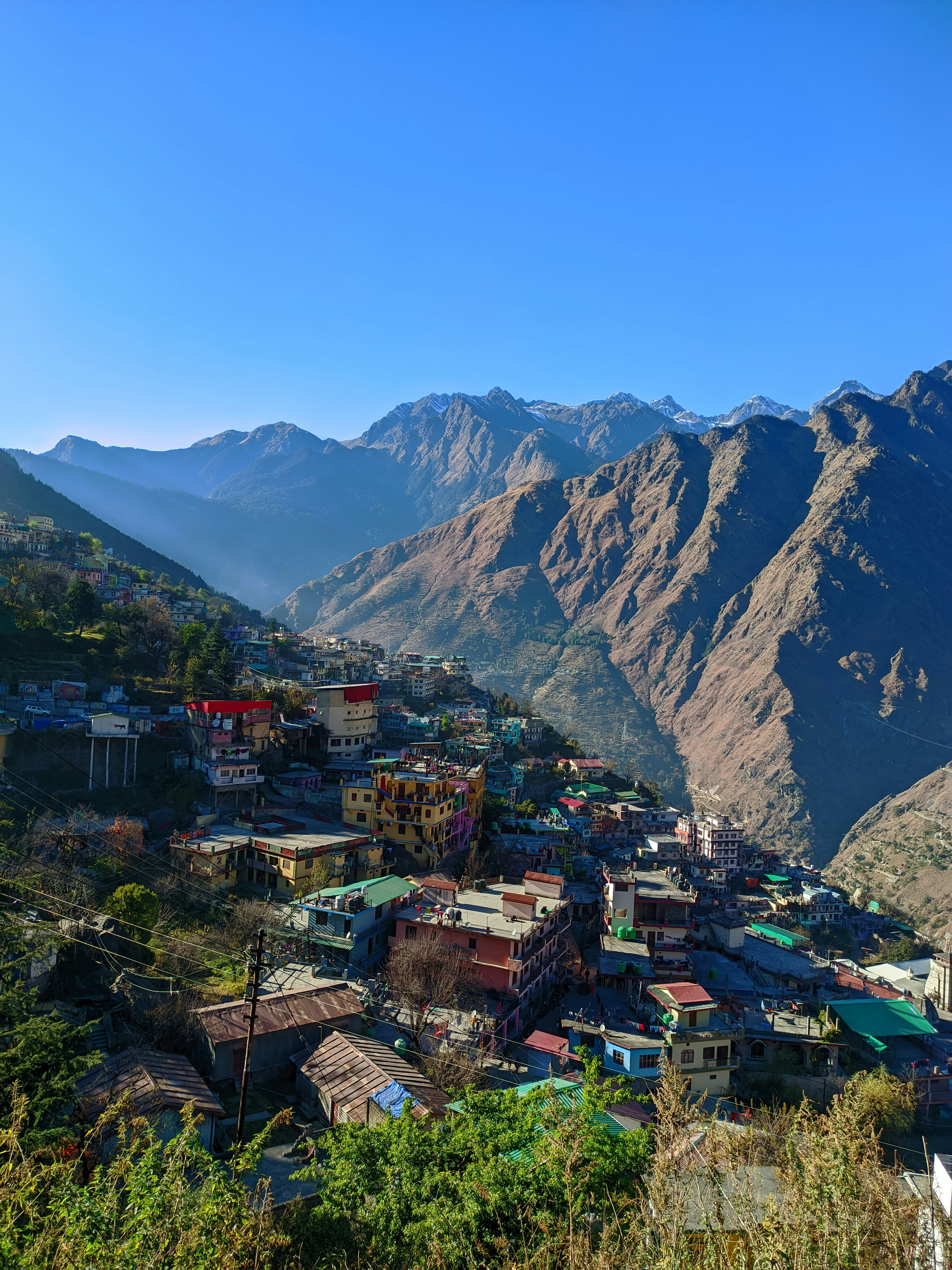
- Panoramic view of Joshimath town on the mountain slopes

- Location in Uttarakhand, India Joshimath (India)
- Coordinates: 30°33′18″N 79°33′54″E
- Country: India
- State: Uttarakhand
- District: Chamoli
- Tehsil: Jyotirmath

Population (2011)
  - Total: 48,202

Languages
  - Official: Hindi
- Time zone: UTC+5:30 (IST)
- PIN: 246443
- Vehicle registration: UK-11
- Website: chamoli.nic.in

Joshimath, also known as Jyotirmath, is a town and a municipal board in Chamoli District in the state of Uttarakhand. Located at a height of 6,150 feet (1,875 m), it is a gateway to several Himalayan mountain climbing expeditions, trekking trails and pilgrim centres like Badrinath. It is home to one of the four cardinal pīthas believed by tradition to be established by Adi Shankara.

Since 7 February 2021, the area was severely affected by the 2021 Uttarakhand flood and its aftermath. The town is confirmed to be sinking due to its geographic location being along a running ridge.

== History ==
Between the 7th and 11th centuries C.E., Katyuri kings ruled the area of varying extent from their capital at "Katyur" (modern day Baijnath) valley in Kumaon. The Katyuri dynasty was founded by Vashudev Katyuri. The ancient Basdeo temple at Joshimath is attributed to Vasu Dev. Vasu Dev was of Buddhist origin, but later followed Brahminical practices and the brahminical practices of Katyuri kings in general is sometimes attributed to a vigorous campaign of Adi Shankara (788-820 CE).

According to Badri Datt Pandey in his book Kumaon Ka Itihas, Joshimath was the original capital of the Katyur dynasty before it moved to Kartikeyapur (modern day Baijnath). According to the story, king Vasudev was a devotee of Narsingh (avatar of lord Vishnu). One day he went hunting and lord Narsingh came to his home disguised. His wife offered food to the god. After eating the food the god went in the king's room for some rest. When the king returned from hunting he got angry after seeing a man sleeping in his bed. He took his sword and cut the left hand of god. Instead of blood, milk started flowing from the wound. After seeing this, the king realised the disguised person was not a common man. He asked for forgiveness from the god. The god said he came because he was happy with his kingdom but after this incident he cursed the king to move to a new location (Baijnath). Because of this wound, the statue in the temple will also have a weak left hand. When the statue's hand will fall off, this will be the end of his dynasty.

Katyuri kings were displaced by the Panwar dynasty in the 11th century AD.

== 2021 glacial outburst flood and aftermath ==
A part of the Nanda Devi glacier broke off in Nanda Devi National Park in Uttarakhand's Chamoli district on 7 February 2021, causing flash flood in Rishiganga and Dhauliganga River, devastating among others the village Rini, the Dhauliganga Dam, the Rishi Ganga dam, Tapovan Vishnugad Hydropower Plant, killing and endangering people. According to media, at least 31 people were confirmed to have been killed and around 165 were reported missing after the flash flood. A PTI report put the number of workers missing at 150.

In the aftermath of the floods, residents began noticing cracks in homes; eventually over 600 houses were evacuated after a local temple collapsed. Eventually over 700 of approximately 4,400-4,600 structures would show cracking and the streets and paved areas in the affected area also showed cracking. Hundreds of residents were able to evacuate and authorities classified zones within the town as "danger", "buffer" and "completely safe" areas; demolition work began on 9 January 2023.

A two year study released in 2023 by the Indian Institute of Remote Sensing used satellite sensing to determine the area was sinking 6.5 cm (2.6 in) each year.

== Demographics ==
As of 2011 India census, there are total 3,898 families residing in Joshimath city. The total population of Joshimath is 16,709 out of which 9,988 are males and 6,721 are females. Thus the Average Sex Ratio of Joshimath is 673.

The population of Children of age 0–6 years in Joshimath city is 2103 which is 13% of the total population. There are 1127 male children and 976 female children between the age 0–6 years. Thus as per the Census 2011 the Child Sex Ratio of Joshimath is 866 which is greater than Average Sex Ratio (673).

As per the Census 2011, the literacy rate of Joshimath is 91.3% up from 77% in 2001. Thus Joshimath has a higher literacy rate compared to the 82.7% of its own district, Chamoli. The male literacy rate is 95.2% and the female literacy rate is 85.2% in Joshimath.

Joshimath had a population of 13,202 in 2001.

== Religious significance ==
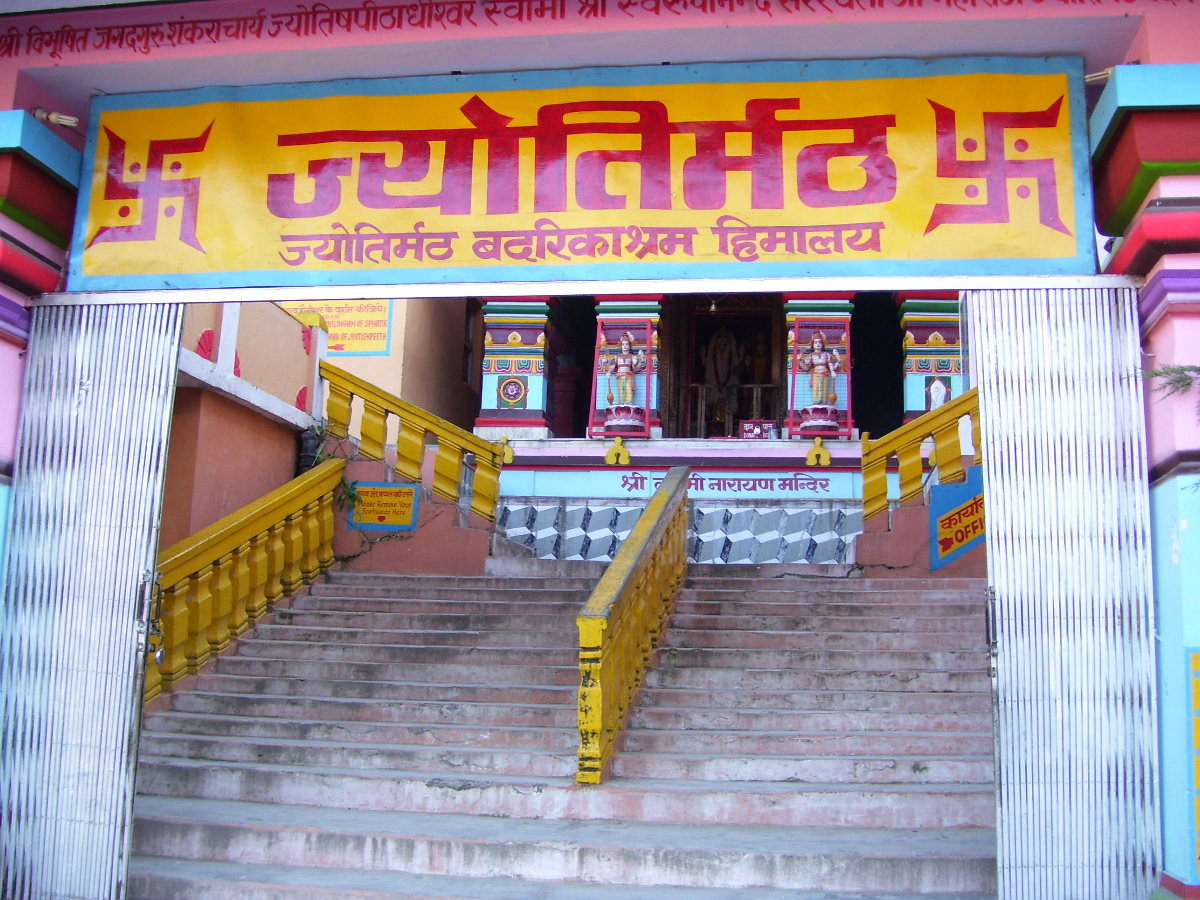
Jyotir Math monastery

Jyotirmath is the uttarāmnāya matha, or northern monastery, one of the four cardinal institutions established by Adi Shankara, the others being those at Shringeri, Puri, Dwarka. Their heads are titled "Shankaracharya". According to the tradition initiated by Adi Shankara, this matha is in charge of the Atharvaveda. Jyotirmath is close to the pilgrimage town of Badrinath. This place can be a base station for travellers going to Guru Gobind Ghat or the Valley of Flowers National Park. The temple Narasimha, is enshrined Badrinarayan along with a pantheon of deities. The presiding deity Lord Narasimha is believed to have been established by Adi Sankara. It is one of the "Divya Desams", the 108 temples of Vishnu revered by the 12 Tamil poet-saints or Alvars, and god and goddess are known as Parimalavalli sametha Paramapurusha Perumal.

== Joshimath Cantonment ==
Joshimath Cantonment is one of the important military stations of Indian Army, present in Uttarakhand. It is the permanent station of "The Garhwal Scouts", the scout battalion of the Garhwal Rifles. It is the closest army station to the Indo-Tibetan Border. It was used as a base camp for the rescue of the victims of 2013 Kedarnath Floods.

== Tourist attractions ==
=== Shankaracharya Math ===
This is the math established by Adi Shankaracharya in North India. The math has temples of Badrinarayan and Rajrajeshwari Devi. It has a sacred cave where Adi Shankaracharya supposedly undertook tapasya.

=== Narsingh Temple ===
This is an ancient temple of Lord Vishnu in Narsingh Avatar and main temple of Joshimath. It has an idol of Lord Narsingh, which is considered established by Shankaracharya. As per local belief, the left hand of this idol has become as thin as hair. On the day when it will break, the mountains Nar - Narayan (नर - नारायण)(which are situated on a way to Badrinath) shall join and become one and Lord Badrinath of Badrinath temple will disappear from the present temple and re-appear as black stone (Shaligram) at new place called Bhavishya Badri, which is situated at a distance of 10 km from Joshimath. During the period when Badrinath temple remains closed during winter every year, an idol of Lord Badri is brought to Narsingh temple and worshiped for six months.

=== Bhavishya Kedar Temple ===
As per local belief, present Kedarnath will disappear along with Badrinath and re-appear in Bhavishya Kedar temple at Joshimath. This temple has a small shivling.

=== Tapovan ===
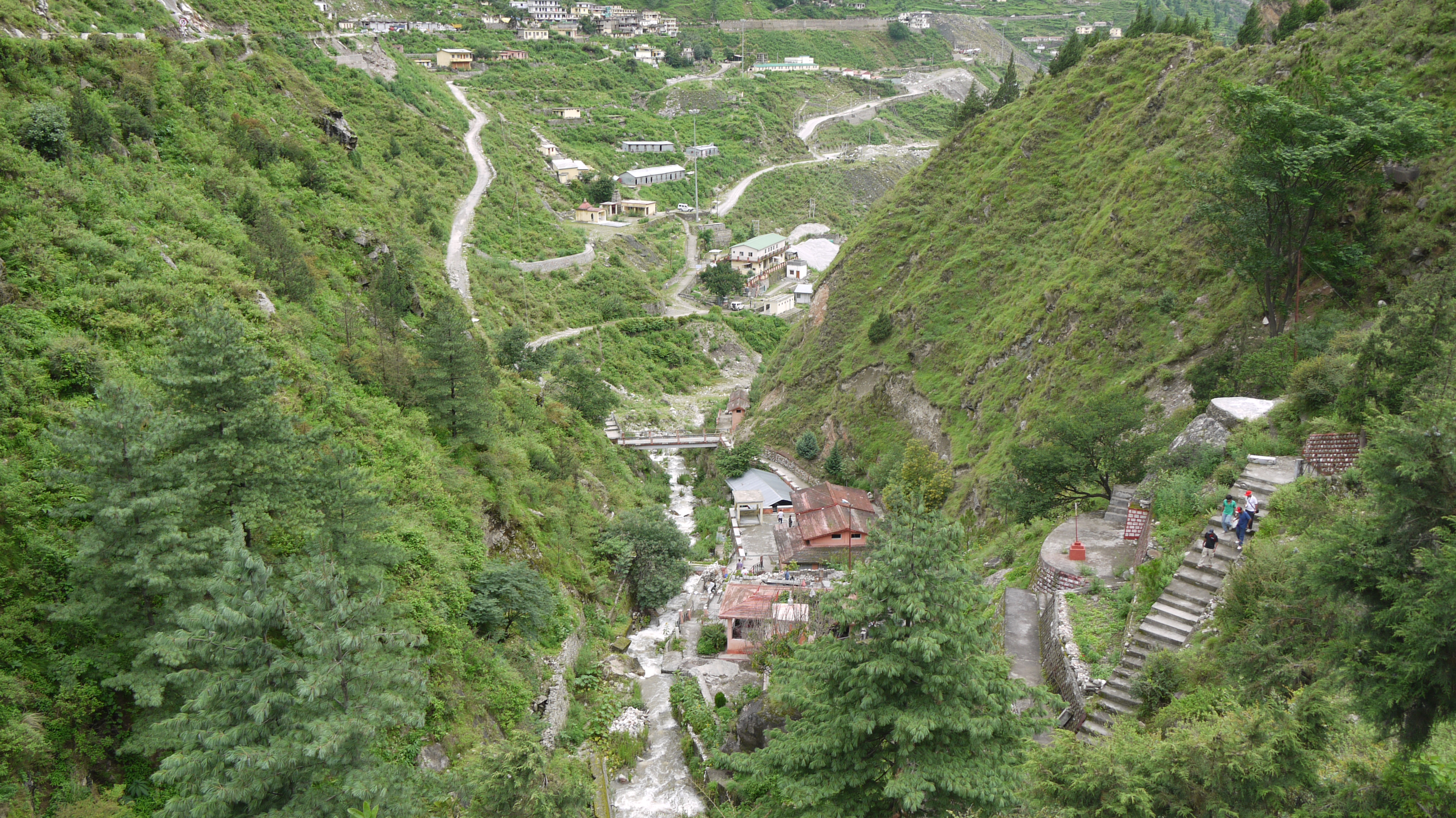
Tapovan

Tapovan is situated 10 km from Joshimath. It has natural hot water springs. The river Dhauliganga is visible from this spot.

=== Ropeway ===
A ropeway to Auli is popular among tourists and one of the longest ropeways in Asia. It is open only during the winter season (November to March) and costs ₹1000 for two way journey. The ropeway is the fastest means for tourists to go to Auli.

=== Gari Bhawani Temple ===
A temple is located 6 km away from the main town of Joshimath toward Rishikesh highway.

=== Kalpeshwer ===
Kalpeshwar is situated near the village called Urgam, which is located in a valley. Urgam is off the highway NH-58 and is reached from Helang which is situated at about 18 km from Joshimath. There are sometimes shared vans from Helang to Nyari/Urgam before noon. Public bus transportation is available everyday from Joshimath to Helang from 05:00 to 19:00.

== Climate ==
Climate data for Jyotirmath (1971–2000, extremes 1958–1987)
Month	Jan	Feb	Mar	Apr	May	Jun	Jul	Aug	Sep	Oct	Nov	Dec	Year
Record high °C (°F)	21.6 (70.9)	21.1 (70.0)	28.6 (83.5)	30.6 (87.1)	31.9 (89.4)	34.2 (93.6)	30.2 (86.4)	29.9 (85.8)	30.0 (86.0)	28.0 (82.4)	25.1 (77.2)	21.2 (70.2)	34.2 (93.6)
Mean daily maximum °C (°F)	11.0 (51.8)	11.8 (53.2)	17.3 (63.1)	21.3 (70.3)	23.5 (74.3)	24.8 (76.6)	23.3 (73.9)	23.0 (73.4)	22.3 (72.1)	22.0 (71.6)	16.9 (62.4)	13.4 (56.1)	19.1 (66.4)
Mean daily minimum °C (°F)	2.0 (35.6)	3.0 (37.4)	6.7 (44.1)	10.7 (51.3)	13.6 (56.5)	16.3 (61.3)	16.9 (62.4)	16.6 (61.9)	14.5 (58.1)	10.7 (51.3)	6.7 (44.1)	3.9 (39.0)	9.9 (49.8)
Record low °C (°F)	−15.1 (4.8)	−4.3 (24.3)	−4.0 (24.8)	0.0 (32.0)	4.9 (40.8)	6.0 (42.8)	10.0 (50.0)	12.6 (54.7)	8.0 (46.4)	1.8 (35.2)	0.1 (32.2)	−3.1 (26.4)	−15.1 (4.8)
Average rainfall mm (inches)	57.1 (2.25)	93.5 (3.68)	118.7 (4.67)	51.3 (2.02)	72.9 (2.87)	93.3 (3.67)	224.6 (8.84)	201.6 (7.94)	111.1 (4.37)	43.2 (1.70)	10.2 (0.40)	26.8 (1.06)	1,104.1 (43.47)
Average rainy days	3.8	5.7	7.4	4.1	6.0	7.5	15.4	15.3	9.1	2.9	1.0	1.6	79.7
Average relative humidity (%) (at 17:30 IST)	55	52	52	51	51	62	79	80	73	59	50	53	60
Source: India Meteorological Department

== Transportation ==
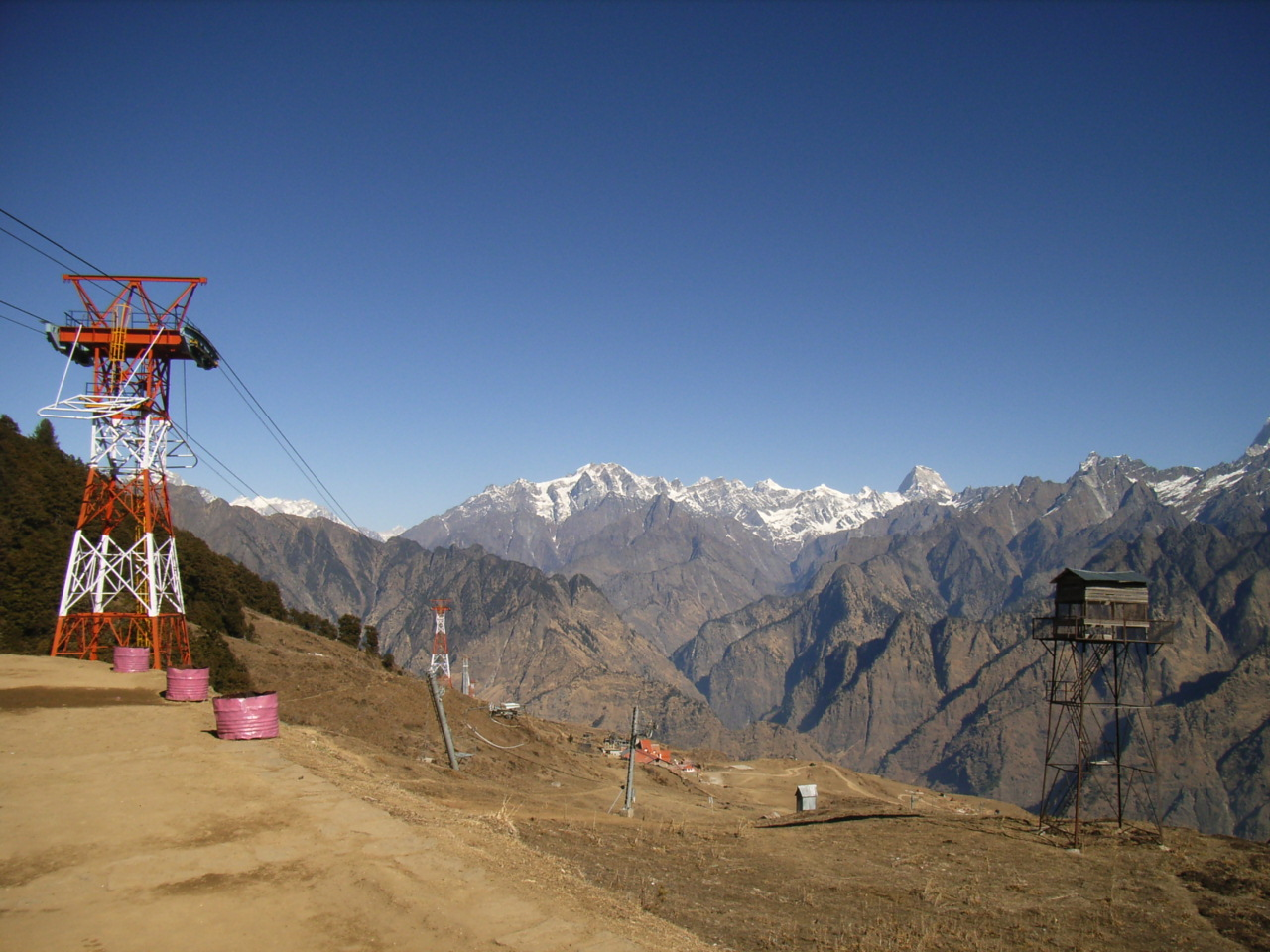
Ropeway from Joshimath to Auli

The nearest airport is the Jolly Grant Airport near Dehradun 293 km (182 mi) away.

The nearest railway station is at Rishikesh, which has a small railway terminal. Haridwar railway junction, 24 km farther from Rishikesh, has train connections to most of the major cities in India.

Joshimath lies on national highway NH58 that connects Delhi with Badrinath and Mana Pass in Uttarakhand near the Indo-Tibet border. Therefore, all the buses and vehicles that carry pilgrims from New Delhi to Badrinath via Haridwar and Rishikesh in the pilgrim season of the summer months pass through Joshimath. Rishikesh is the major starting point for a road journey to Joshimath. Regular buses operate from Rishikesh bus station to Joshimath. The road distance from Rishikesh to Joshimath is 251 km (156 mi) via Rudraprayag and Chamoli.

== See also ==
- Adi Shankara
- Shankaracharya
- Kalady, Kerala - the holy birthplace of Jagadguru Adi Shankaracharya
- Govardhan Peetham (East), Puri, Odisha
- Dwarka Sharada Peetham (West), Dwarka, Gujarat
- Shri Sringeri Sharada Peetham (South), Sringeri, Karnataka
- Shri Kanchi Kamakoti Peetham, Kancheepuram, Tamil Nadu
- Gauḍapāda
- Govinda Bhagavatpada
- Shri Gaudapadacharya Math
- Mandukya Upanishad
- Advaita Vedanta
