= Uttarakhand flood =

Uttarakhand flood may refer to these floods in the Himalayan Indian state of Uttarakhand:

- 2013 North India floods
- 2021 Uttarakhand flood
- 2025 Uttarakhand flash flood

== See also ==
- Himalayan flood (disambiguation)
