= Bhimashankaralinga Shivacharya =

Indian Spiritual Leader

Jagad Guru Bhimashankar Linga Shivacharya Mahawami is an Indian Hindu spiritual leader, currently the 325th Rawal (chief priest) of Kedarnath Dham. In this role, he is responsible for overseeing temple rituals and ensuring they are conducted according to traditional practices.

Bhimashankarlingam is tied to the traditions of Lingayat ascetics, emphasizing devotion, scholarship, and community service. Following his predecessors, he assumed leadership of the Bhimashankar Matha, a centuries-old institution in Shiradhon, Nanded, Maharashtra, which serves as a spiritual and cultural hub for the Veerashaiva-Lingayat community.

== Philosophy and contributions ==
Mahaswami is described as a supporter of Basavanna's teachings, including principles such as equality, spiritual inquiry, and community service. He has spoken in favor of maintaining strict regulations for pilgrimages and has expressed concern about commercialization and practices he considers inappropriate.

== Work during Kedarnath floods ==
Shivacharya has led disaster relief efforts during the 2013 North India floods which severely affected Kedarnath, where he coordinated the distribution of food, clothing, and medical supplies to affected families. He began the purification of the Kedarnath Temple following the flood, and raised money for rebuilding of the temple. After the floods, a dispute arose among religious leaders regarding the worship of the Kedarnath idol while cremations of bodies discovered in the area were still pending. Shivacharya decided to move the replica of the 11th Jyotirling idol to Ukhimath, located 61 kilometers from Kedarnath. This decision led to disagreements among spiritual factions.
