= 2021 Uttarakhand flood =

Fatal flooding in India

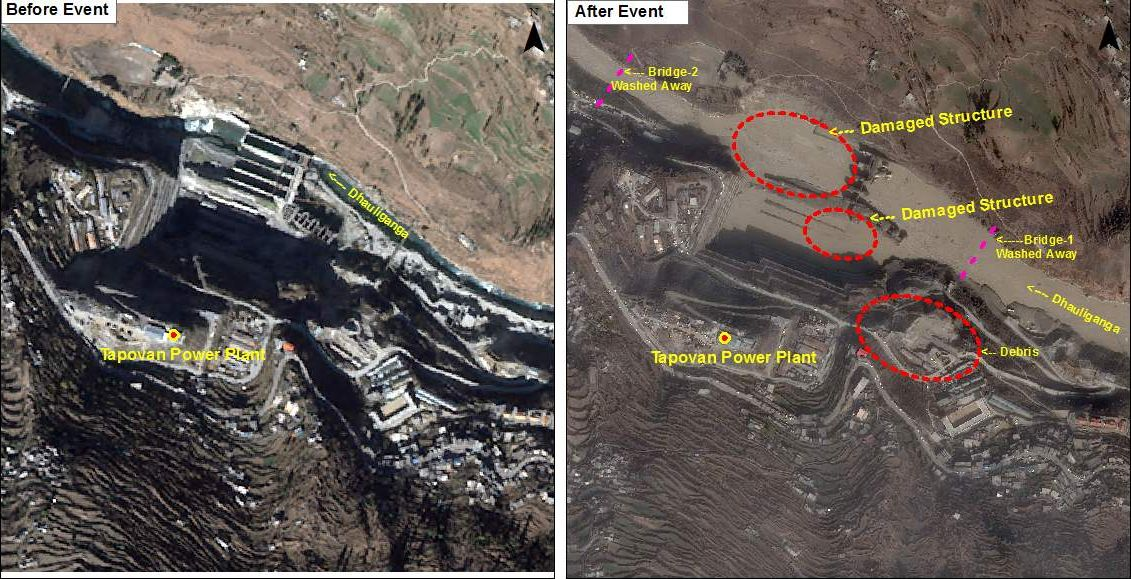
- The Tapovan Vishnugad Hydropower Plant before and after the flood
- Date: 18 February 2021
- Location: 30.375°N 79.731°E
- Cause: Ice-rock avalanche / Glacier collapse
- Deaths: 83
- Missing: 121
- Property damage: Most houses are damaged. Few houses that remain undamaged on the site were covered in slush up to 21 feet deep.

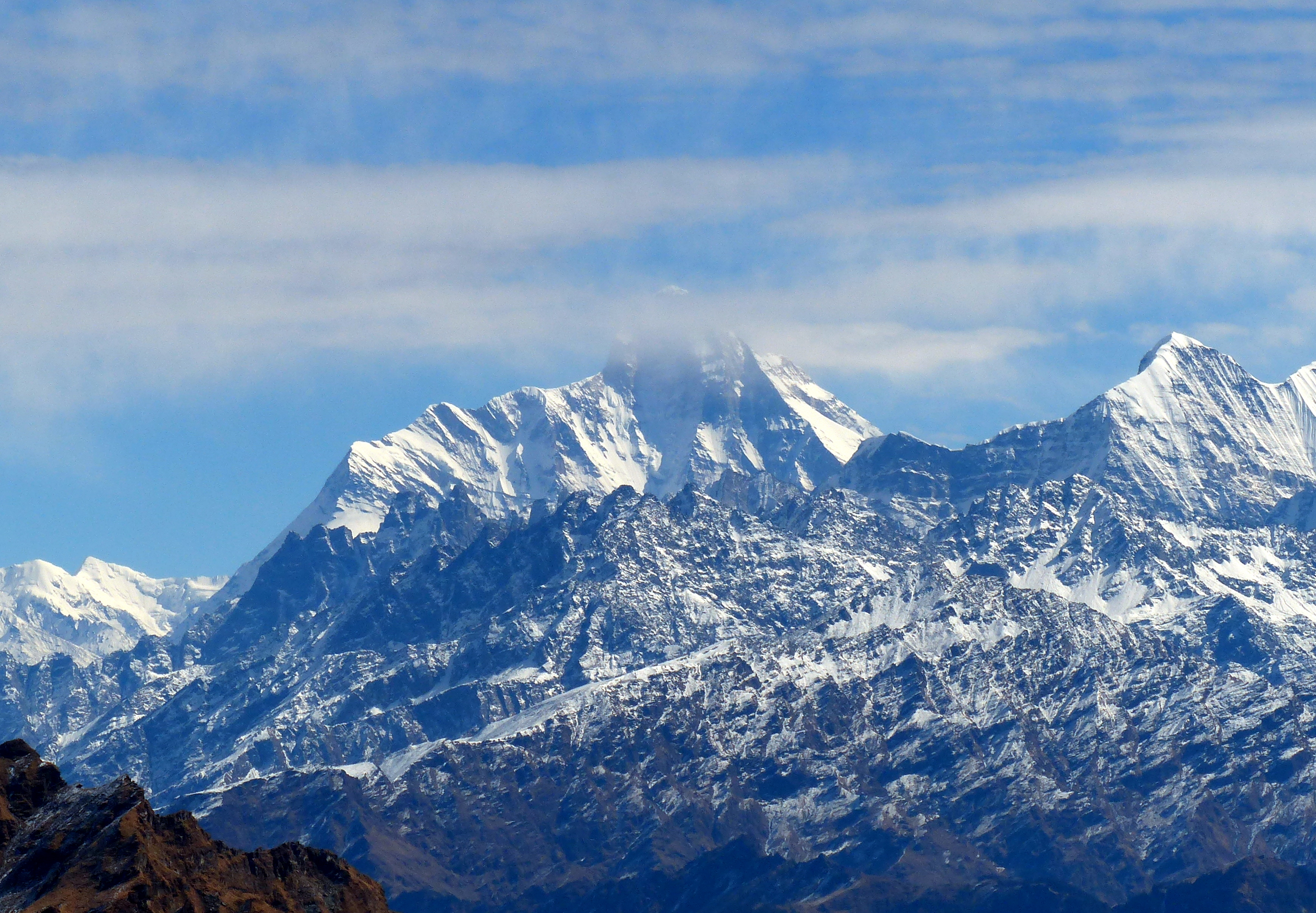
Nanda Devi summit (behind a cloud) and the surrounding glaciers

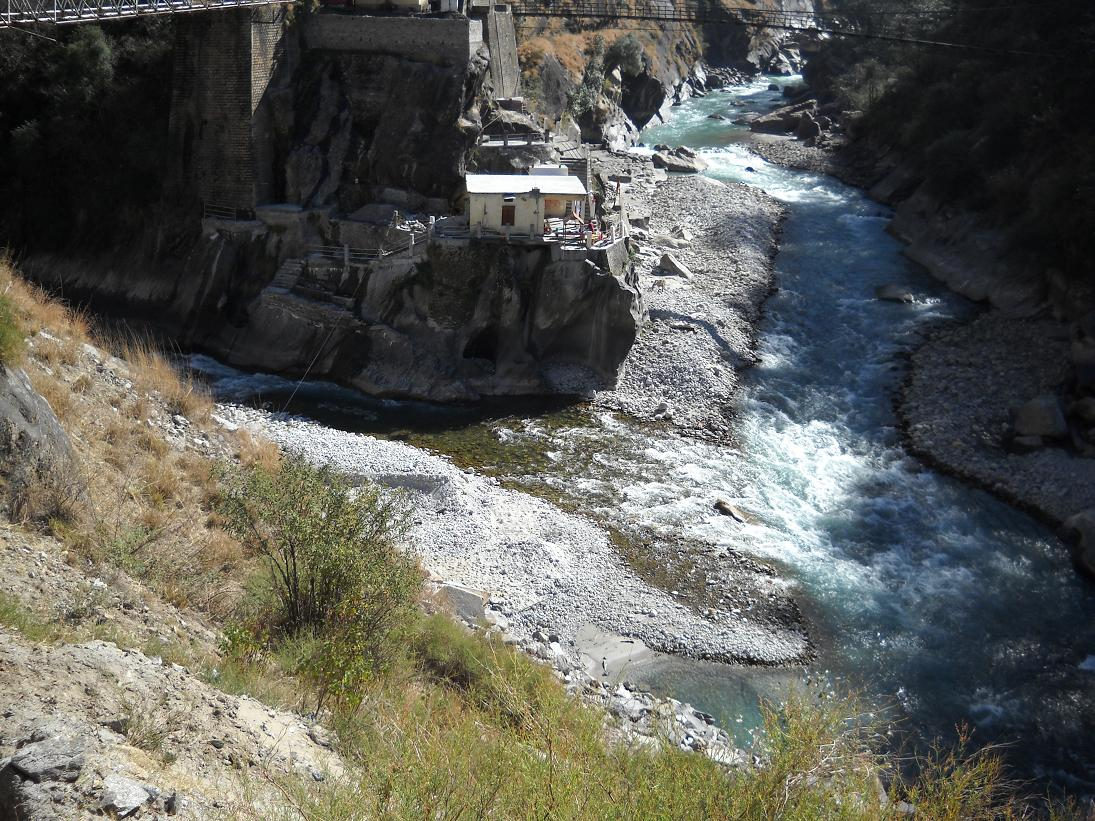
The confluence of the Dhauliganga and Alaknanda rivers at Vishnuprayag

The 2021 Uttarakhand flood, also known as the Chamoli disaster, began on 7 February 2021 in the environs of the Nanda Devi National Park, a UNESCO World Heritage Site in the outer Garhwal Himalayas in Uttarakhand state, India. It was caused by a large rock and ice avalanche consisting of material dislodged from Ronti peak. It caused flooding in the Chamoli district, most notably in the Rishiganga river, the Dhauliganga river, and in turn the Alaknanda—the major headstream of the Ganges. The disaster left around 300 killed or missing. Most were workers at the Tapovan dam site.

== Cause ==
According to early reports, the flooding was speculated to have been caused by a portion of the Nanda Devi glacier breaking off early on 7 February, releasing the water trapped behind the ice, and causing a glacial lake outburst flood. But this was shown to be incorrect as satellite images showed no lakes in the valley and that a landslide very clearly triggered the events. On 8 February 2021, The Times, London, reported that a flood was caused by a portion of glacier being torn away and causing a landslide. In satellite images, a 0.5 mi (0.80 km) scar is visible on the slopes of Nanda Ghunti, a 20,700 ft (6,300 m) peak on the southwestern rim of the Nanda Devi sanctuary, a wall of mountains surrounding the Nanda Devi massif. According to an article in Scientific American, 12 February 2021, data from Planet Labs was interpreted by Dan Shugar, a geomorphologist at the University of Calgary, to suggest that a hanging glacier "15 football fields long and five across" had separated from a mountain and plummeted into the Ronti Gad, a tributary of the Rishiganga.

According to BBC News, four scientists from the Wadia Institute of Himalayan Geology, Dehradun, India flew over the site in a helicopter, took photographs, and gathered other data; they consider the hanging glacier that cracked and plunged into the Rishiganga basin, to have been attached to a subsidiary peak, Raunthi, 5,600 m (18,372 ft), just below Nanda Ghunti. According to Dr. Kalachand Sain, director of the Wadia Institute, climate change is the major factor in the rapid freezing and thawing of ice that causes glacier fractures. A subsequent analysis by Carbon Brief highlighted how though climate change probably didn't directly cause the outburst – instead a landslide or similar geological change triggered it – however, the environmental changes caused by climate change probably contributed to the geographic conditions that allowed for the disaster.

In June 2021, the International Charter 'Space and Major Disasters' published a study that confirmed a large rock and ice avalanche as the cause of the disaster. The result was based on data from earth observation satellites, as well as seismic records, numerical model results, and eyewitness videos. The authors estimate the avalanche at about 27 million cubic meters, consisting of 80% rock and 20% glacier ice. The glacier ice turned into water over the course of the 3.2 km elevation difference from the peak, which further worsened the impact by causing a debris flood wave.

== Casualties and damage ==
Satellite imagery before and after the flooding. Tapovan Hydropower Plant on the top left, Ronti - where the slide started - on the bottom center.

Among the places most severely hit by the floods are Joshimath, Rini, Nanda Devi National Park, Tapovan Vishnugad Hydropower Plant and Sridhar.

The disaster left over 200 killed or missing. As of May 2021, "83 bodies and 36 human body parts out of a total of 204 people missing have been recovered so far." Of the missing and dead, 140 were workers at the Tapovan Hydropower Plant site.

The 13-megawatt Rishiganga power project in Rini, on the Rishiganga river, a tributary to the Dhauliganga River, was damaged and 35 laborers working on the project were missing as of February 2021. The Chamoli district in Uttarakhand appeared to have been hit hardest by the surging Dhauliganga River. The Dhauliganga Dam at the confluence of the Rishiganga and Dhauliganga rivers (at 30°33′45″N 79°34′33″E) was washed away by the floodwaters. Chief Minister of Uttarakhand Tirath Singh Rawat stated that flash floods also impacted a much larger hydro project owned by the NTPC with around 176 laborers working on a project which had two tunnels where those workers were trapped. Senior police officials told media that a bridge in the Tapovan area that connected 13 villages was washed away in the avalanche. The flood damaged the Tapovan Vishnugad Hydropower Plant and resulted in a loss of Rs1,500 crore (US$206 million).

== Relief measures ==
Many villagers were evacuated as authorities emptied two dams farther down the river to stop the floodwaters from reaching towns of Haridwar and Rishikesh. Two C-130J Super Hercules with 3 teams of National Disaster Response Force (NDRF) had been deployed in the rescue mission.

In the aftermath of the floods, residents in Joshimath began noticing cracks in homes; eventually over 600 houses were evacuated after a local temple collapsed.

== Environmental concerns ==
The geographic state of the area prior to the disaster has been described as "fragile". According to The New York Times, scientists had warned the Government of India for many years that the Himalayas had been warming at a dangerously high rate and the region's ecosystem had become too physically exposed to the dangers of development projects. Dr. Ravi Chopra, the director of the People's Science Institute in Uttarakhand and a member of a scientific committee appointed by India's Supreme Court in 2014, had advised against building dams in the paraglacial zone, i.e. river valleys in which the floor is higher than 7,000 feet (2,100 m), but the Government of India disregarded their objections. According to Dr. Chopra, both the hydro-electric power projects that were washed away in the flood were constructed in this zone. According to another committee led by Dr. Chopra and appointed by India's Supreme Court in 2020, per the New York Times, the Government of India had built 500 miles (800 km) of highway—much 33 feet (10 m) wide—in the hills of Uttarakhand in order to improve approaches to Hindu temples in the high Himalayas, overriding the advice of its own experts, The headman of Reni, the village most adversely affected by the flood, stated that the village residents feared that the blasting of the rocks during the hydropower dam's construction would bring on dangerous landslides. "We used to hear blasting and see the rocks shift," he said. "When this project was under construction, half of our village slid. We requested to be shifted from here to another place. The government said they would do it, but it never happened."

== Gallery ==
The rescue operation at NTPC's Tapovan Vishnugad Hydropower Plant – Tunnel 1;

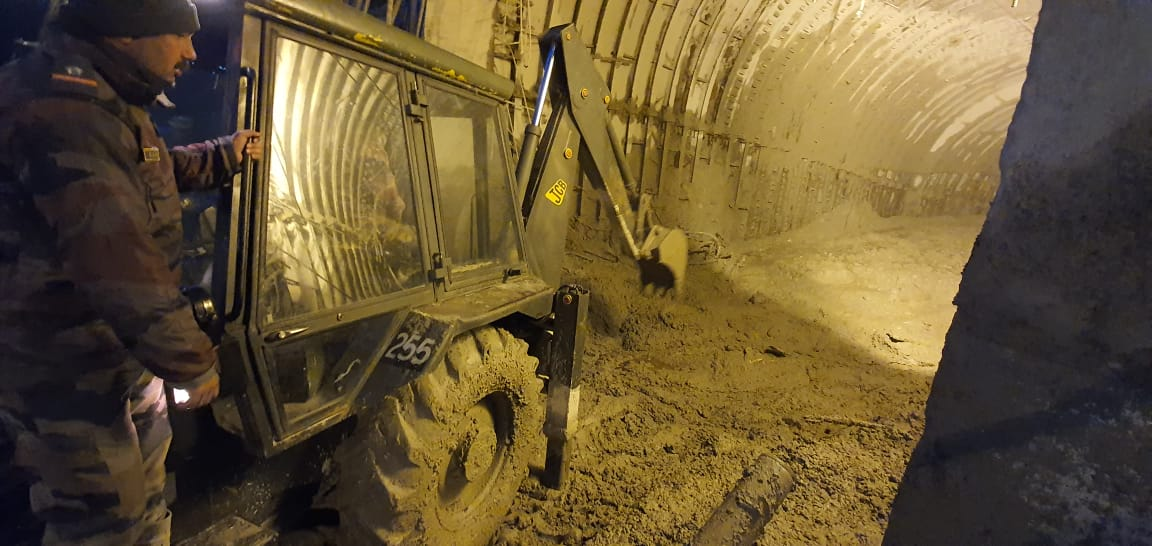
Rescue operation at the Tunnel 1 of Tapovan Vishnugad Hydropower Plant, Date: 8 February 2021

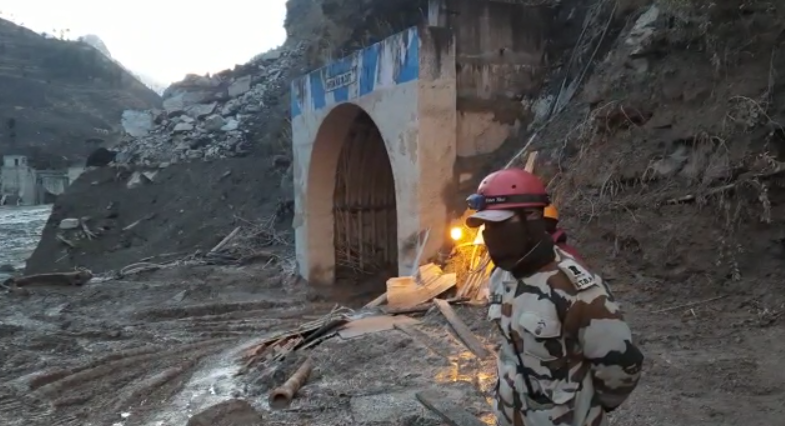
Rescue operation at the Tunnel 1 of Tapovan Vishnugad Hydropower Plant, Date: 8 February 2021

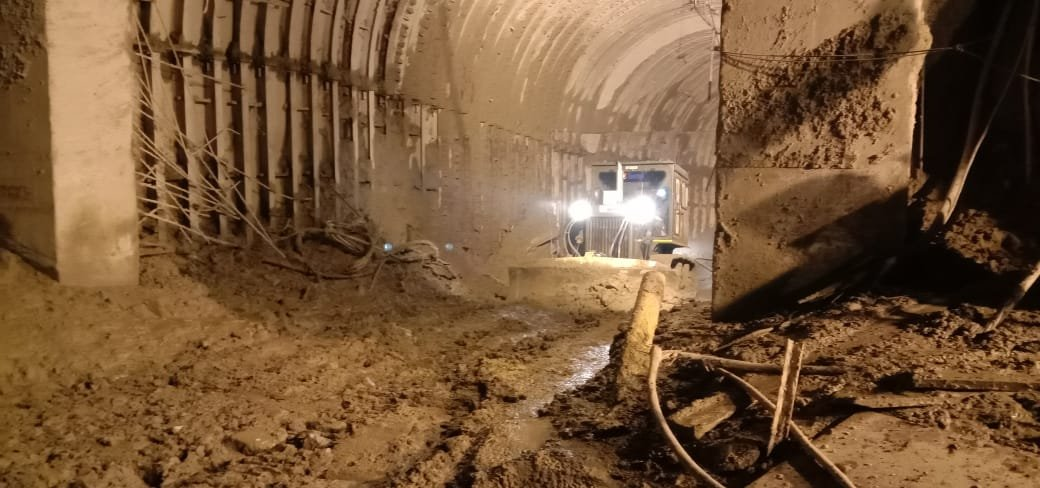
Rescue operation at the Tunnel 1 of Tapovan Vishnugad Hydropower Plant, Date: 8 February 2021

The rescue operation at NTPC's Tapovan Vishnugad Hydropower Plant – Tunnel 2;

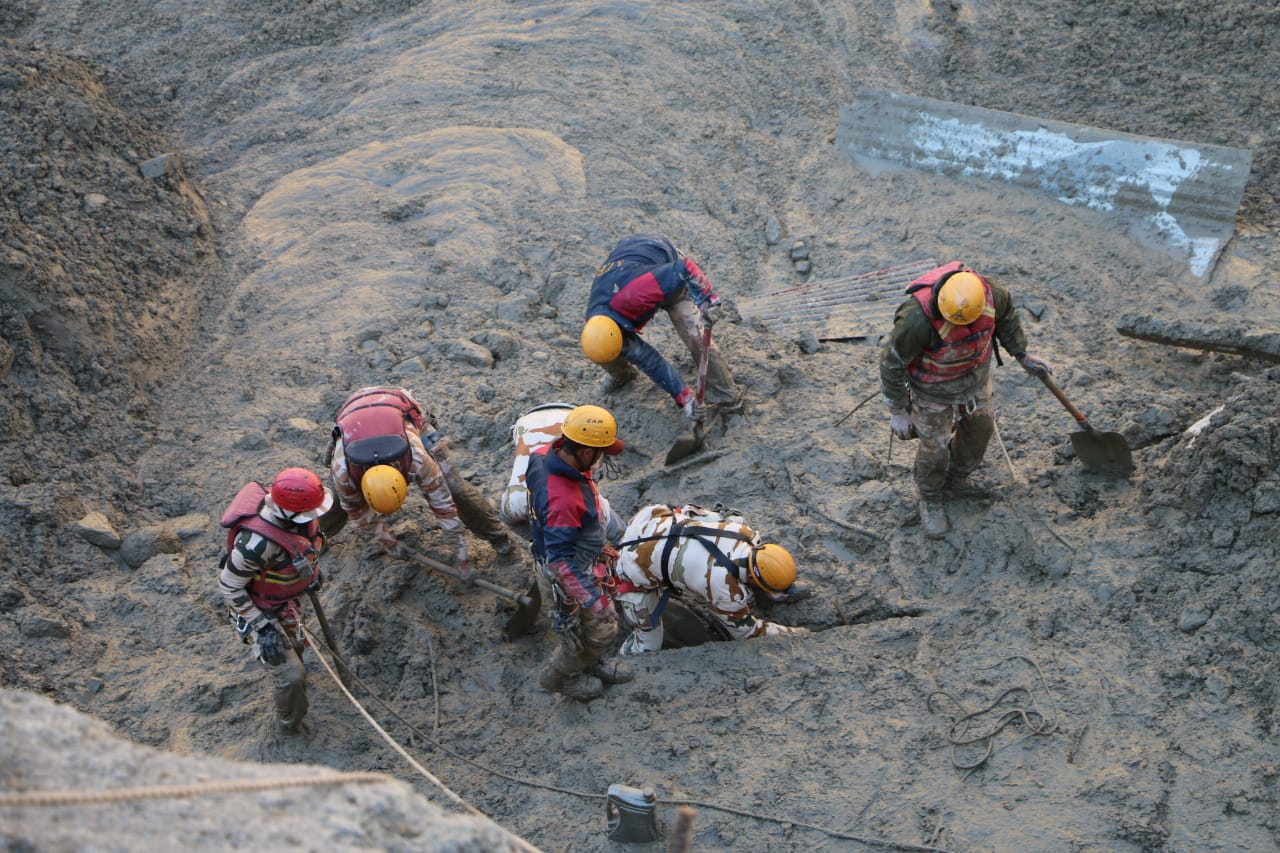
Rescue operation at the Tunnel 2 of Tapovan Vishnugad Hydropower Plant, Date: 8 February 2021

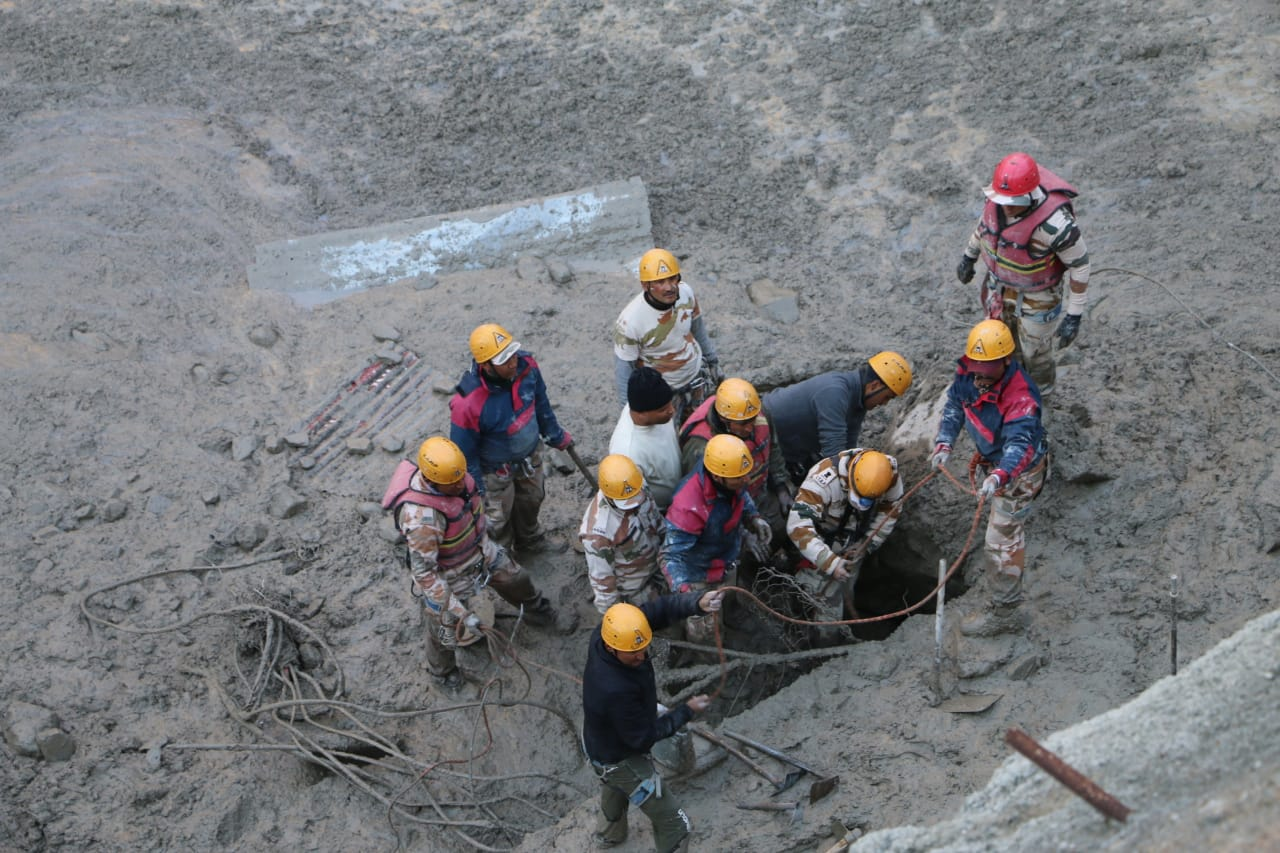
Rescue operation at the Tunnel 2 of Tapovan Vishnugad Hydropower Plant, Date: 8 February 2021

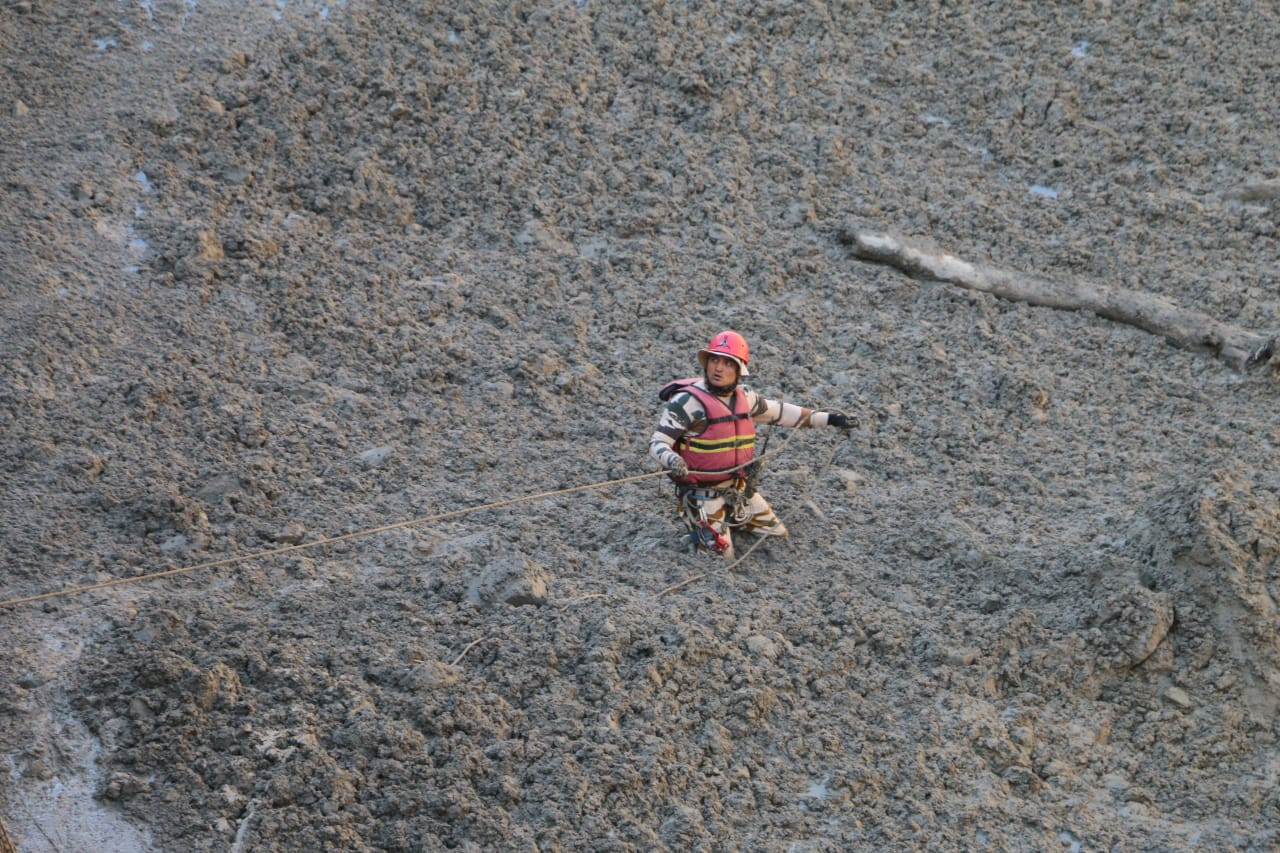
Rescue operation at the Tunnel 2 of Tapovan Vishnugad Hydropower Plant, Date: 8 February 2021

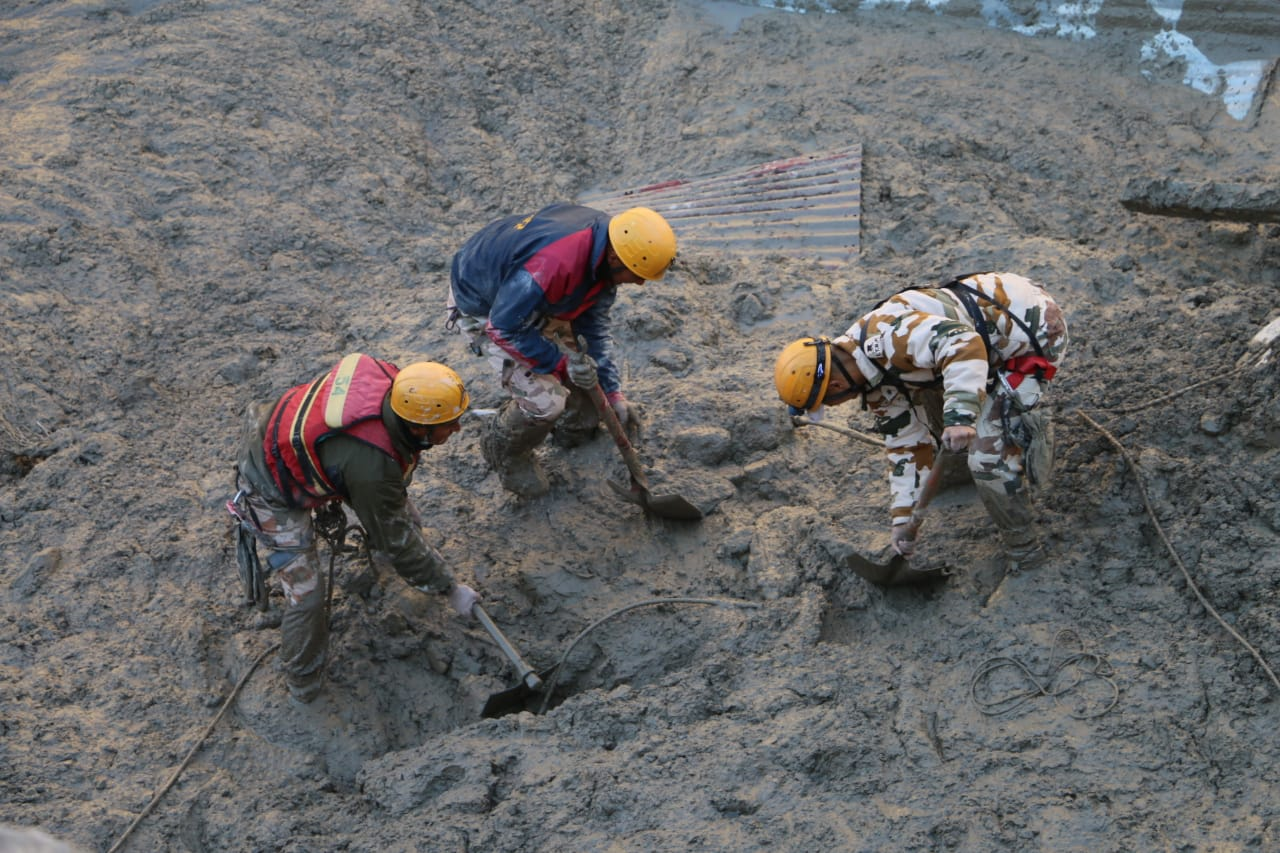
Rescue operation at the Tunnel 2 of Tapovan Vishnugad Hydropower Plant, Date: 8 February 2021

== See also ==
- 2013 North India floods
- 2026 Nepal floods
- List of floods
- List of deadliest floods
- Floods in India
