= Sambal, Mandi =

Sambal
- Village
- Location within Himachal Pradesh Location within India
- Coordinates: 31°42′30″N 77°01′49″E
- Country: India
- State: Himachal Pradesh
- District: Mandi district
- Time zone: UTC+5:30 (IST)
- PIN: 175124

Sambal is a village in the Mandi district, Himachal Pradesh, India.

== History ==
On August 14, 2023, seven people were swept away in the village during a flash flood.

== Transport ==
The village is served by the National Highway 3.
