= 2022 Balrampur floods =

2022 floods in India

- Date: 13 October 2022
- Location: Balrampur
- Cause: Heavy Rainfall

In October 2022, heavy rainfall caused floods in Balrampur, in the Indian state of Uttar Pradesh. Over 1300 villages were affected by this flood.

== Impact ==
287 villages were affected in Balrampur district such as Jagtapurwa, Panditpurwa, Johvahna, Kalandarpur, Kodari, Gangapur, Lalpur, Phagunia, Jogiya Kalan, Lalnagar, Durgapur and Shernagar.

== See also ==
- Floods in India
