= Dhauliganga Dam =

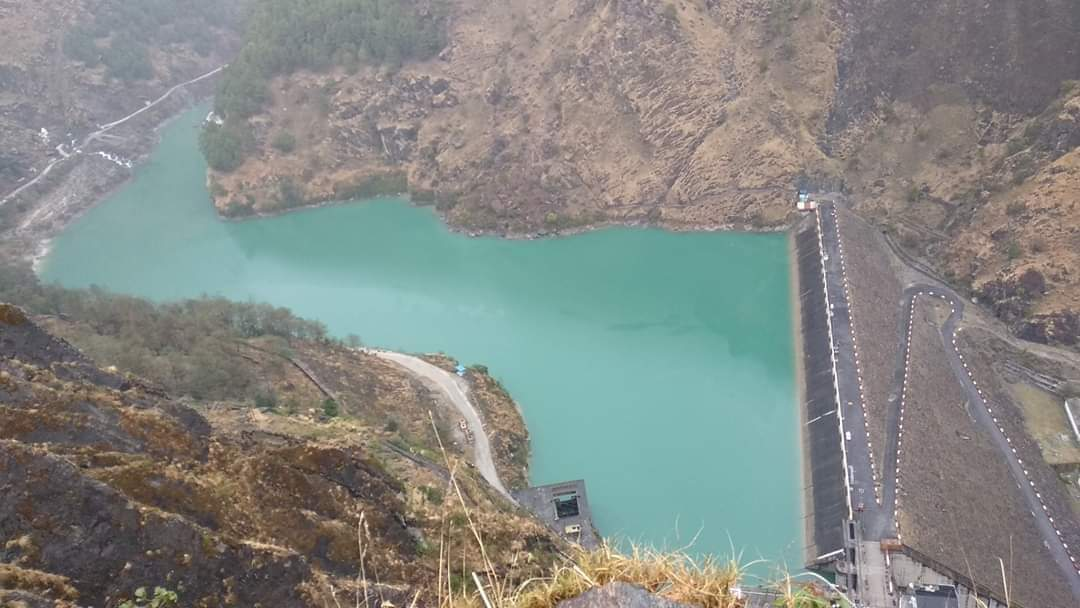
- Dhauliganga Dam Reservoir

- Location within Uttarakhand
- Country: India
- Location: Uttarakhand
- Coordinates: 29°58′42.6″N 80°34′19.2″E
- Status: destroyed by flooding
- Construction cost: ₹15,800,000,000
- Owner: National Hydroelectric Power Corporation Ltd

Dam and spillways
- Type of dam: Embankment, earth and rock-fill
- Impounds: Dhauliganga River
- Height: 56 m (184 ft)
- Length: 315 m (1,033 ft)
- Spillway type: Gate controlled

Power Station
- Commission date: 2005
- Type: Run-of-the-river
- Turbines: Vertical Francis turbines
- Installed capacity: 4x70 MW

The Dhauliganga Dam was a concrete face rock and earth-fill embankment dam on the Dhauliganga River near Dharchula in Uttarakhand, India, close to the borders with Tibet and Nepal. It had very little pondage and operated as run-of-the-river. It was constructed by a joint venture of Kajima Construction Corporation, Ltd., and Daewoo Engineering & Construction with Bauer Maschinen. HRT & PH was constructed by JV of [HCC, Hindustan Construction Company] and Samsung Corporation [E&C] Group. It generates 280 MW(4x70 MW) of hydro power.

In June 2013, there was an unprecedented flash flood, causing massive debris accumulation and the complete submergence of the power house. Damage caused electrical equipment replacement and loss of total generation capacity for more than six months.

== Destruction ==
On February 7, 2021 a sudden flash flood caused by an avalanche resulted in the complete destruction of the hydro power plant, affecting over one thousand people in the area.

== See also ==
- Tapovan Vishnugad Hydropower Plant
- Rini, Uttarakhand
- Rishiganga
