= 2013 North India floods =

Floods that occurred in Northern India in 2013

2013 Northern Indian Floods
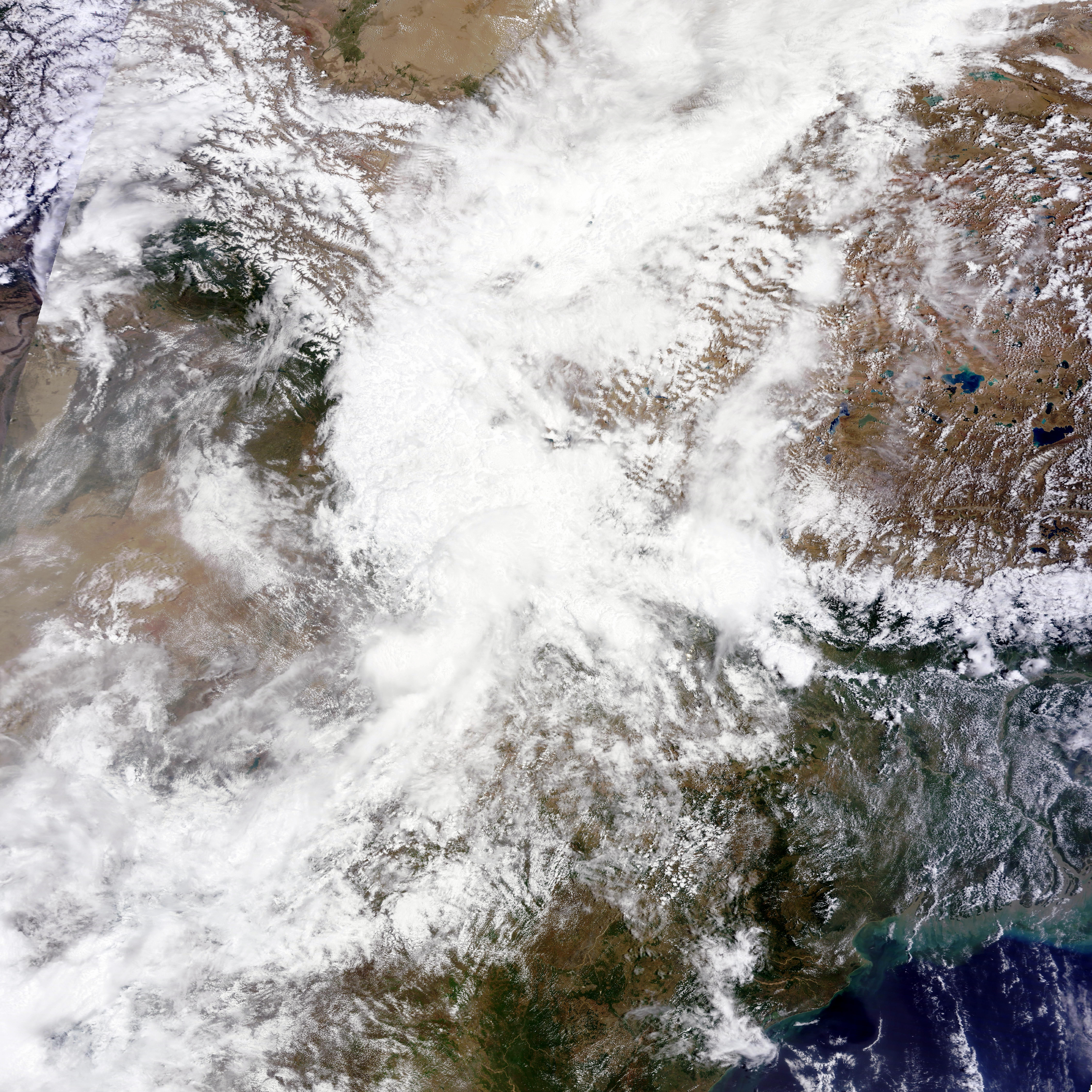
- NASA satellite imagery of Northern India on 17 June, showing rainclouds that led to the disaster
- Location: Uttarakhand Himachal Pradesh Uttar Pradesh Nepal Sudurpashchim Pradesh Karnali Pradesh Some parts of Tibet
- Deaths: 6,054
- Property damage: 4,550 villages were affected

In June 2013, a mid-day cloudburst centered on the North Indian state of Uttarakhand caused devastating floods and landslides, becoming the country's worst natural disaster since the 2004 tsunami. The rainfall received that month was far greater than the rainfall the state usually received. Debris blocked the rivers, causing major overflow. The main day of the flood was 16 June 2013.

Some parts of Himachal Pradesh, Haryana, Delhi and Uttar Pradesh in India experienced the heavy rainfall, as well as regions of Western Nepal and some parts of Western Tibet. Over 89% of the casualties occurred in Uttarakhand. As of 16 July 2013, according to figures provided by the Government of Uttarakhand, more than 5,700 people were "presumed dead." This total included 934 local residents. The death toll was later placed at 6,054.

Destruction of bridges and roads left about 300,000 pilgrims and tourists trapped in the valleys leading to three of the four Hindu Chota Char Dham pilgrimage sites. The Indian Air Force, the Indian Army and paramilitary troops evacuated more than 110,000 people from the flood-ravaged area.

== Origin ==
From 16 June 2013 a well-marked cyclonic circulation developed around a low pressure area over the Bay of Bengal, moving westwards, rapidly intensified due to moisture supplied from both the Bay of Bengal and the Arabian Sea, combining with intense western disturbances from the north, thus causing the Indian state of Uttarakhand and adjoining areas to receive heavy rainfall, leading to 37.5% of the benchmark rainfall during a normal monsoon. This caused the melting of Chorabari Glacier at the height of 3800 meters and cresting of the Mandakini River, which led to heavy floods near Gobindghat, Kedar Dome, Rudraprayag district, Uttarakhand, Himachal Pradesh and Western Nepal, and acute rainfall in other nearby regions of Delhi, Haryana, Uttar Pradesh and some parts of Tibet.

The upper Himalayan territories of Himachal Pradesh and Uttarakhand are full of forests and snow-covered mountains and thus remain relatively inaccessible. They are home to several major and historic Hindu and Sikh pilgrimage sites besides several tourist spots and trekking trails. Heavy rainfall for four consecutive days as well as melting snow aggravated the floods. Warnings by the India Meteorological Department predicting heavy rains were not given wide publicity beforehand, causing thousands of people to be caught unaware, resulting in huge loss of life and property.

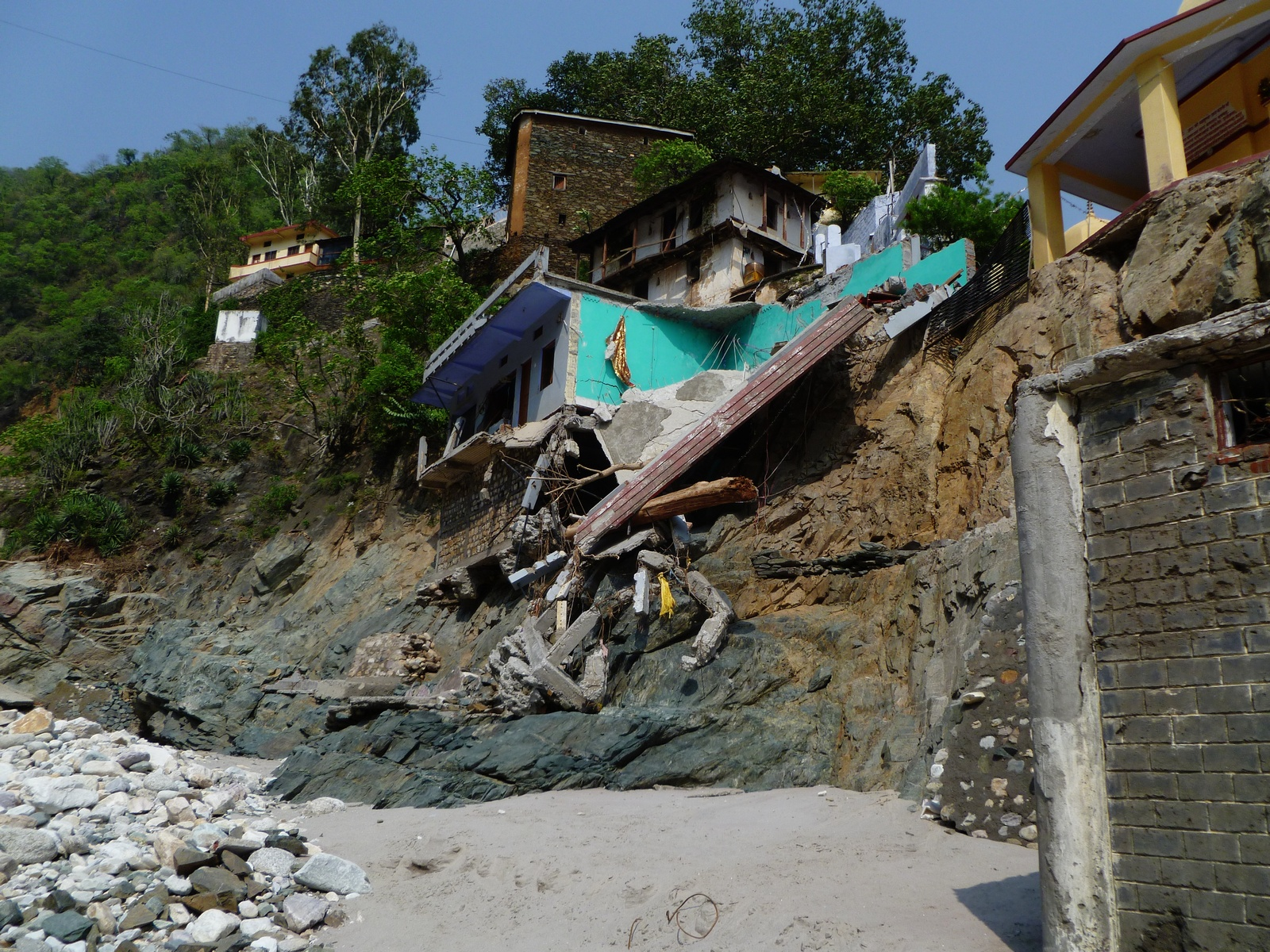
Broken end of footbridge over the Mandakini River at Rudraprayag Sangam

Landslides, due to the floods, damaged several houses and structures, killing those who were trapped. The heavy rains resulted in large flash floods and massive landslides. Entire villages and settlements such as Gaurikund and the market town of Ram Bada, a transition point to Kedarnath, had been obliterated, while the market town of Sonprayag suffered heavy damage and loss of lives. Pilgrimage centres in the region, including Gangotri, Yamunotri, Kedarnath and Badrinath, the hallowed Hindu Chardham (four sites) pilgrimage centers, are usually visited by thousands of devotees, especially after the month of July on wards. Over 70,000 people were stuck in various regions because of damaged or blocked roads. People in other important locations like the Valley of flowers, Roopkund and the Sikh pilgrimage centre Hemkund were stranded for more than three days. National Highway 7 (Old National Highway 58), an important artery connecting the region was also washed away near Jyotirmath and in many other places. Because summers have more tourists, the number of people impacted was substantial. For more than three days, stranded pilgrims and tourists were without rations or survived on little food. The roads were seriously damaged at more than 450 places, resulting in huge traffic jams, and the floods caused many cars and other vehicles to be washed away. On 18 June, more than 12,000 pilgrims were stranded at Badrinath, the popular pilgrimage center located on the banks of the Alaknanda River. Rescuers at the Hindu pilgrimage town of Haridwar on the river Ganga recovered bodies of 40 victims washed down by the flooded rivers as of 21 June 2013. Bodies of people washed away in Uttarakhand were found in distant places like Bijnor, Prayagraj (then Allahabad) and Bulandshahr in Uttar Pradesh. Searching for bodies who died during the extreme natural fury of June in Kedar valley continued for several months and even as late as September 2013, about 556 bodies were found out of which 166 bodies were found in highly decomposed state during fourth round of search operations.

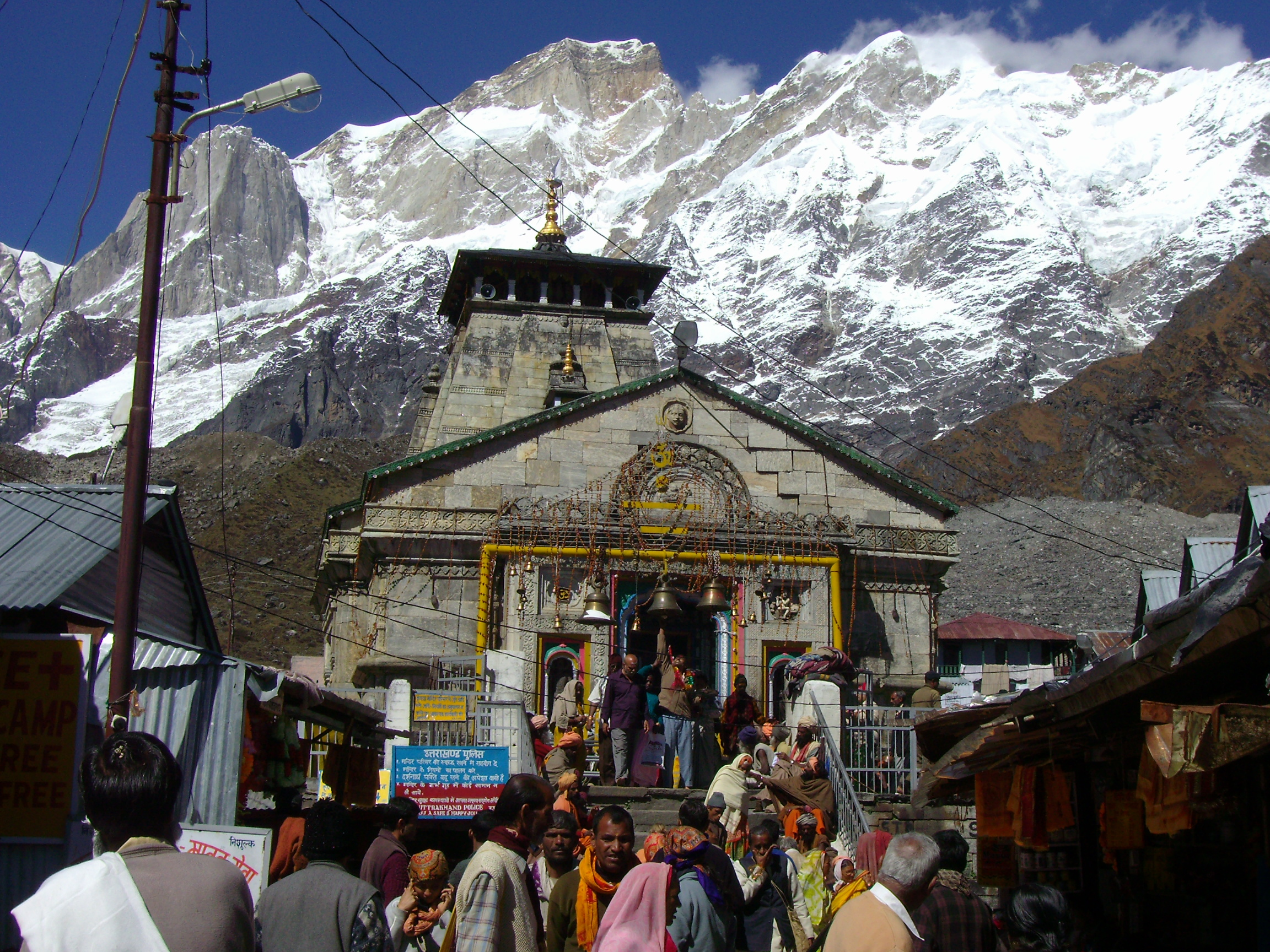
The Kedarnath Temple, before the floods

Although the Kedarnath Temple and the main Shiva Lingam inside was not damaged, its base was inundated with water, mud and boulders from the landslide, damaging its perimeter. Many hotels, rest houses and shops around the temple in Kedarnath township were destroyed, resulting in several casualties. Most of the destruction at Kedarnath was caused by a sudden rapid melting of ice and snow on the Kedarnath Mountain, 6 km (3.7 mi) from the temple, which flooded the Chorabari Lake (upstream) and then Kedarnath. The temple was flooded with water resulting in several deaths due to drowning and panic-driven stampede. Even after a week, dead bodies had not been removed from Kedarnath town, resulting in water contamination in the Kedarnath valley and villagers who depend on spring water suffered various types of health problems such as fever and diarrhea. When the flood receded, satellite images showed one new stream at Kedarnath town. No damage at the Kedarnath Temple occurred. The Uttarakhand Government announced that due to the extensive damage to the infrastructure, the temple will be temporarily closed to regular pilgrims and tourists for a year or two, but the temple rituals will still be maintained by priests. The Temple was opened for pilgrims on Sunday, 4 May 2014 by Rawal Bhimashankarlingam.

=== Other regions affected by the disaster ===
==== National Capital Region ====
New Delhi, Gurugram, Faridabad and surrounding areas received a high amount of rainfall on 16 June 2013, leading to flooding of the low-lying areas of the cities. The Yamuna River swelled to a new height of 207.75 meters submerging the low lying flood plains along the banks.

==== Uttar Pradesh ====
Six-hundred and nine villages, covering a population of 700,000, in 23 districts of Uttar Pradesh were affected by the flood and drought. As of 11 July 2013, more than 120 deaths were reported from the state. The number of people who went to Uttarakhand were mostly from Uttar Pradesh.

==== Himachal Pradesh ====
In Himachal Pradesh, floods caused loss of life and property and death toll in the state was 20.

==== Nepal ====
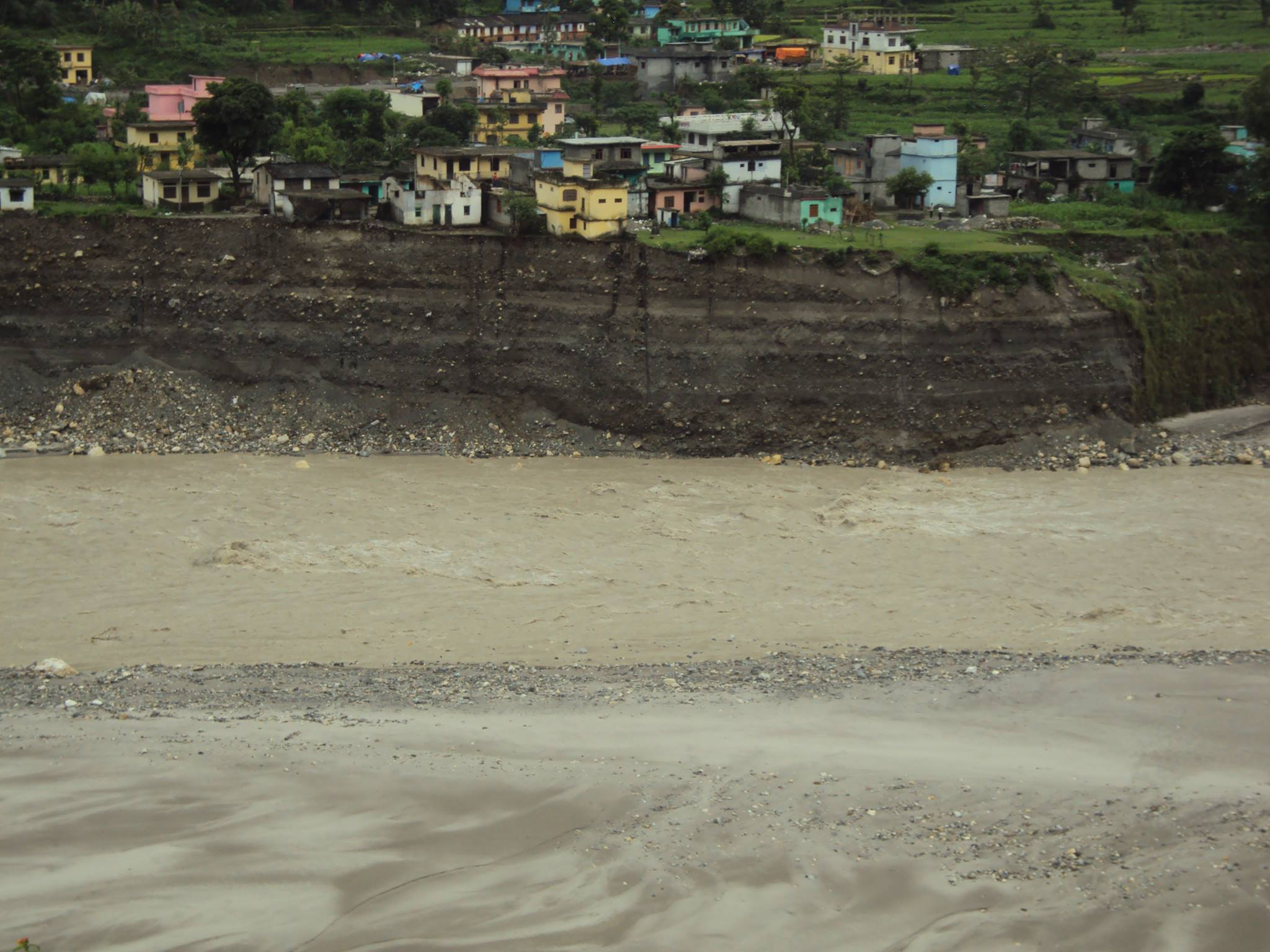
Effect of flood in Darchula district of Nepal

About 6000 citizens of Nepal were visiting the Indian region, of which 1,000 were rescued as of 22 June 2013. Flooding of the Dhauliganga and the Mahakali rivers had caused extensive damage, with reports of 128 houses and 13 government offices swept away and over 1000 people homeless. A bridge that joins the India-Nepal border was highly damaged.

== Rescue operations ==
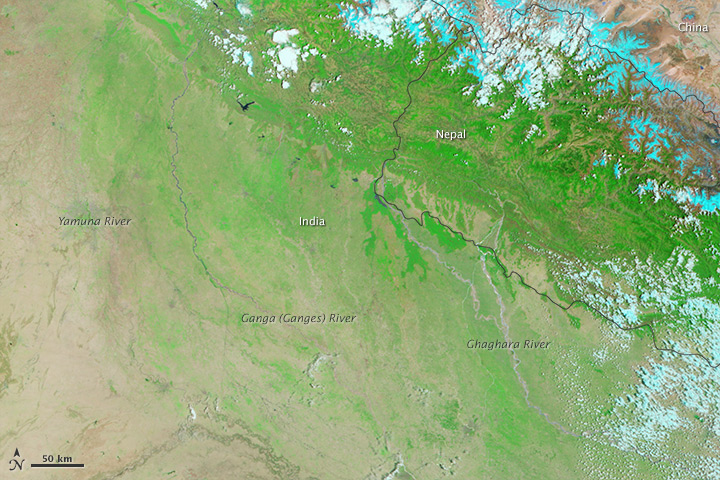
Satellite image of the affected region, taken on 30 May by NASA's MODIS

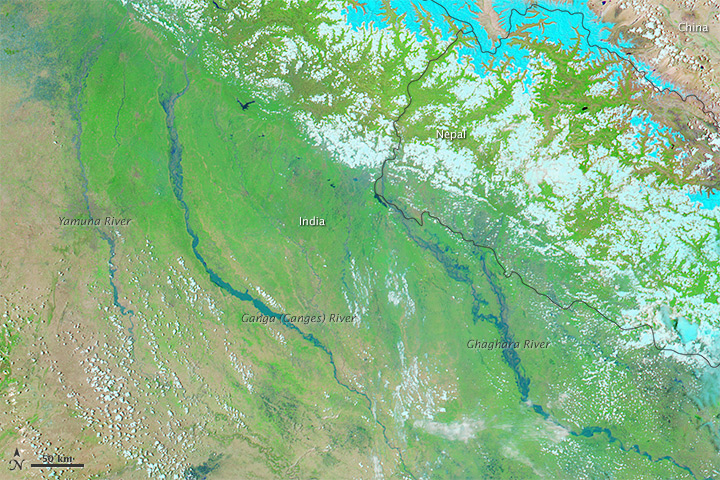
Same location, shot on 21 June floods

The Indian Army, Air Force, Navy, Indo-Tibetan Border Police (ITBP), Border & National Disaster Response Force (NDRF), Public Works Department and local administrations worked together for quick rescue operations. Several thousand soldiers were deployed for the rescue missions. Activists of political and social organisations were also involved in the rescue and management of relief centres. The national highway and other important roads were closed to regular traffic. Helicopters were used to rescue people, but due to the rough terrain, heavy fog and rainfall, manoeuvring them was a challenge. By 21 June 2013, the Army had deployed 10,000 soldiers and 11 helicopters, the Navy had sent 45 naval divers, and the Air force had deployed 43 aircraft including 36 helicopters. From 17 to 30 June 2013, the IAF airlifted a total of 18,424 people and flew a total of 2,137 sorties, delivering a total of 3,36,930 kg of relief material and equipments.

On 25 June, one of three IAF Mil Mi-17 rescue helicopters returning from Kedarnath, carrying five Air Force Officers, nine of the NDRF, and six of the ITBP crashed on a mountainous slope near Gauri Kund, killing all on board. The deceased soldiers were given a ceremonial Guard of honour by Home minister of India, at an event organised by the Uttarakhand State Government.

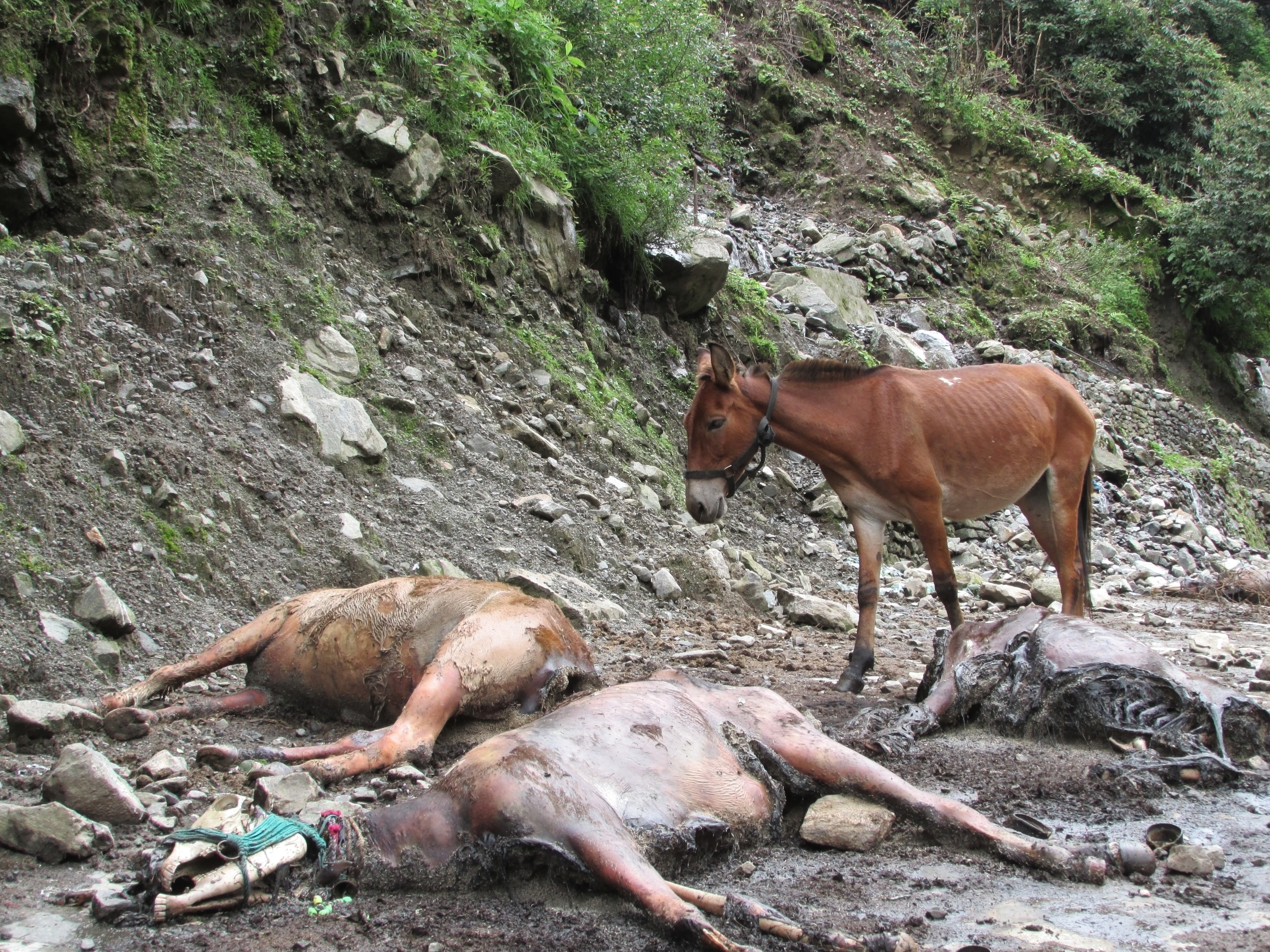
Animals suffered greatly during the calamity

Indo Tibetan border Police (ITBP) a Force which guards the Indo China borders on the high himalayas with its three Regional Response Centres (RRCs) based at Matli (Uttarkashi), Gauchar (Chamoli) and Pithoragarh swung into action and started rescue and relief operation. 2000 strong ITBP force with its mountaineering skills and improvisation methods started rescue of stranded pilgrims. It was a simultaneous effort by ITBP at Kedar ghati, Gangotri valley and Govind ghat areas. According to official figures by ITBP, they were able to rescue 33,009 pilgrims in 15 days on their own from extremely remote and inaccessible areas. Before Army or Air Force called in, being deployed in the nearby areas, ITBP took the first call and saved many lives. They also distributed food packets to stranded pilgrims who were in a pathetic condition being not having any food for more than 72 hours at many places.

Even TDP Supremo N. Chandrababu Naidu hurried to Dehradun by a special aircraft to undertake rescue operations for pilgrims in the state. He carried 196 stranded pilgrims back to safety and arranged buses for their commute back to their destinations. In order to inform the families of the stranded and missing people in Uttarakhand, the party had established a phone centre at the NTR Trust Bhavan in Hyderabad. At the stations in Secunderabad, Kazipet, and Vijaywada, the party has also established information and assistance desks.

== Aftermath ==
The Prime Minister of India Manmohan Singh undertook an aerial survey of the affected areas and announced ₹10 billion (US$100 million) aid package for disaster relief efforts in the state. Several state governments announced financial assistance, with Uttar Pradesh pledging ₹250 million (US$2.6 million), the governments of Haryana, Maharashtra and Delhi ₹100 million (US$1.0 million) each, the governments of Tamil Nadu, Odisha, Gujarat, Madhya Pradesh and Chhattisgarh ₹50 million (US$520,000) each. The US Ambassador to India extended a financial help of US$150,000 through the United States Agency for International Development (USAID) to the NGOs working in the area and announced that the US will provide further financial aid of US$75,000. The help was later politely rejected by Government of India. The Government of Kerala offered 20 million rupees and all ministers offered one month's salary.

The Government of India also cancelled 9 batches, or half the annual batches of the Kailash-Mansarovar Yatra, a Hindu pilgrimage. The Chardham Yatra pilgrimage, covering Gangotri, Yamunotri, Kedarnath and Badrinath was cancelled for 2 years to repair damaged roads and infrastructure, according to the Uttarakhand Government.

Government agencies and priests of Kedarnath temple were planning mass cremation of the hundreds of victims, after one week of tragedy. Local youths from several affected villages near Gangotri helped stranded tourists and pilgrims, by sending messages to their places and by providing food. Rescuers also retrieved approximately ₹10 million (US$100,000) and other jewellery from local persons, including some people dressed like sadhu babas, who reportedly collected it from a destroyed building of a Bank and damaged shops.

Nehru Institute of Mountaineering (NIM) was given the responsibility of rebuilding Kedarnath. Although the institute did not have the expertise in urban planning or construction, they mastered high-altitude training. Under the leadership of Colonel Ajay Kothiyal, the NIM was successful in rebuilding Kedarnath.

== Climate and environmental factors ==
A study by Utah State University analyzed the natural and anthropogenic influences on the climate anomalies using simulations, and found that (a) northern India has experienced increasingly large rainfall in June since the late 1980s, (b) the increase in rainfall appears to be associated with a tendency in the upper troposphere towards amplified short waves, and (c) the phasing of such amplified short waves is tied to increased loading of green-house gases and aerosols. In addition, a regional modeling diagnosis attributed 60–90 % of rainfall amounts in the June 2013 event to post-1980 climate trends.

Unprecedented destruction from the rainfall witnessed in Uttarakhand state was also attributed, by environmentalists, to unscientific developmental activities undertaken in recent decades, contributing to a high level of loss of property and life. Roads constructed in haphazard style, new resorts and hotels built on fragile river and more than 70 hydroelectric projects in the watersheds of the state led to a "disaster waiting to happen" as termed by certain environmentalists. The environmental experts reported that the tunnels built and blasts undertaken for the 70 hydro electric projects contributed to the ecological imbalance in the state, with flows of river water restricted and the streamside development activity contributing to a higher number of landslides and more flooding.

== In popular culture ==
A novel titled A Long Journey was written and published by independent author Pawan Kumar Pandey, who has the floods and the resulting tragedy in his background. The 2018 film Kedarnath starring Sushant Singh Rajput and Sara Ali Khan tells of a love story set in the times of the disaster in the valley around the Kedarnath Temple.

== See also ==
- 2021 Uttarakhand flood
- 2025 Uttarakhand flash flood
