= Paraglacial =

Term for unstable conditions in glaciology

Paraglacial means unstable conditions caused by a significant relaxation time in processes and geomorphic patterns following glacial climates. Rates of landscape change and sediment output from the system are typically elevated during paraglacial landscape response.

When a large mass of ice melts, the newly exposed landscape is free of vegetation and is generally unstable. Often, the retreating glacier is providing the area with high stream discharge, further increasing erosion. The combination of a lack of vegetation, high discharge, and a changing climate (the cause of deglaciation) forces ecological communities, sediment deposition patterns and surface morphology to adjust to the new conditions over time.

Periglacial processes—those that directly involve ice—may be prominent in the early stages of paraglacial landscape response, but the two terms are not synonymous. Many geomorphic processes that don't require freezing conditions—for example fluvial erosion, transport and deposition—are typically involved in paraglacial change.

== See also ==
- Ballantyne, C.K. (2002) Paraglacial Geomorphology. Quaternary Science Reviews, 21, 1935–2017.
- Benn, D.I. and Evans, D.J.A., Glaciers and Glaciation, (1998) ISBN 0-340-65303-5 or 0-340-58431-9 (paperback), Section 7.6.
- Iturrizaga, L. (1999). Typical debris accumulation forms and formations in High Asia. A glacial-history-based concept of the origin of Postglacial debris accumulation landscapes in subtropical high mountains with selected examples from the Hindu Kush, the Karakoram and the Himalayas. In: GeoJournal, Tibet and High Asia V, vol. 47, 277–339.
- Iturrizaga, L. (2008). Paraglacial landform assemblages in the Hindukush and Karakoram Mountains. In: Geomorphology, 95, Issues 1–2, 27–47.
- Slaymaker O., 2011. Criteria to distinguish between periglacial, proglacial and paraglacial environments. Quaestiones Geographicae 30(1): 85–94. DOI 10.2478/v10117-011-0008-y
