= Shiradhon =

Village in Maharashtra

- village
- Location in Maharashtra, India Shiradhon (India)
- Coordinates: 18°57′41″N 77°19′27″E
- Country: India
- State: Maharashtra
- District: Nanded

Government
  - Type: Panchayati raj (India)
  - Body: Gram panchayat

Languages
  - Official: Marathi
- Time zone: UTC+5:30 (IST)
- ISO 3166 code: IN-MH
- Website: maharashtra.gov.in

Shiradhon is a village in Nanded district, Maharashtra, India.

Shiradhon is famous for its Bhimashankar temple. Lord Bhimashankar is an avatar of Lord Mahadev.
