= 2023 Himalayan floods =

Floods in 2023

- Cause: Heavy rains

Meteorological history
- Duration: August 14, 2023

Flood
- Max. rainfall: 16.54 in (420 mm)

Overall effects
- Fatalities: 72
- Missing: 20
- Areas affected: Indian Himalayan Region, including Uttarakhand and Himachal Pradesh

Floods and landslides on 14 August 2023 in the Indian Himalayan Region killed at least 72 people. Losses were estimated at $1.2 billion, and several hundred roads were closed. Portions of Himachal Pradesh received rainfall amounts of more than 12 inches (300 mm).

== Preparations ==
India's weather department stated that moderate to heavy rainfall was expected across the Himalayan Region on 14 August and issued a red alert for heavy rainfall for the Uttarakhand state.

== Impact ==
Heavy rainfall caused flooding and landslides in Himachal Pradesh, where 19 people were killed in Mandi district. Fourteen people were killed in Shimla, the capital of Himachal Pradesh, after two landslides and a cloudburst. In Solan, roads were flooded and homes were washed away, killing seven people, In Sambal, seven people were also killed during the floods, four people died in Hamirpur district, and at least 700 flooded roads were closed in Himachal Pradesh state. All schools and colleges were closed following the floods. In Uttarakhand state, two people were killed. At least twenty people were reported as missing. In total, 72 people were killed due to the floods. The Kalka–Shimla Railway, which is part of the UNESCO heritage site, was also damaged as the tracks were washed out and various damages occurred at nearly 175 points; including a 50-meter bridge near Summer Hill. The line was restored and functional in October 2023.

Portions of Himachal Pradesh and Uttarakhand received up to 16.54 inches (420 mm) in 24 hours.

== Aftermath ==
Rescue teams, including personnel from the Indian Air Force and National Disaster Response Force (NDRF), were dispatched to flooded areas. Around 2,000 people were rescued, and Sukhvinder Singh Sukhu, chief minister of Himachael Pradesh, estimated the losses at $1.2 billion.
