= 2012 Himalayan flash floods =

Natural disaster in northern India

- Location of India
- Date: August 2012
- Location: North India
- Deaths: 31 dead, 40 missing

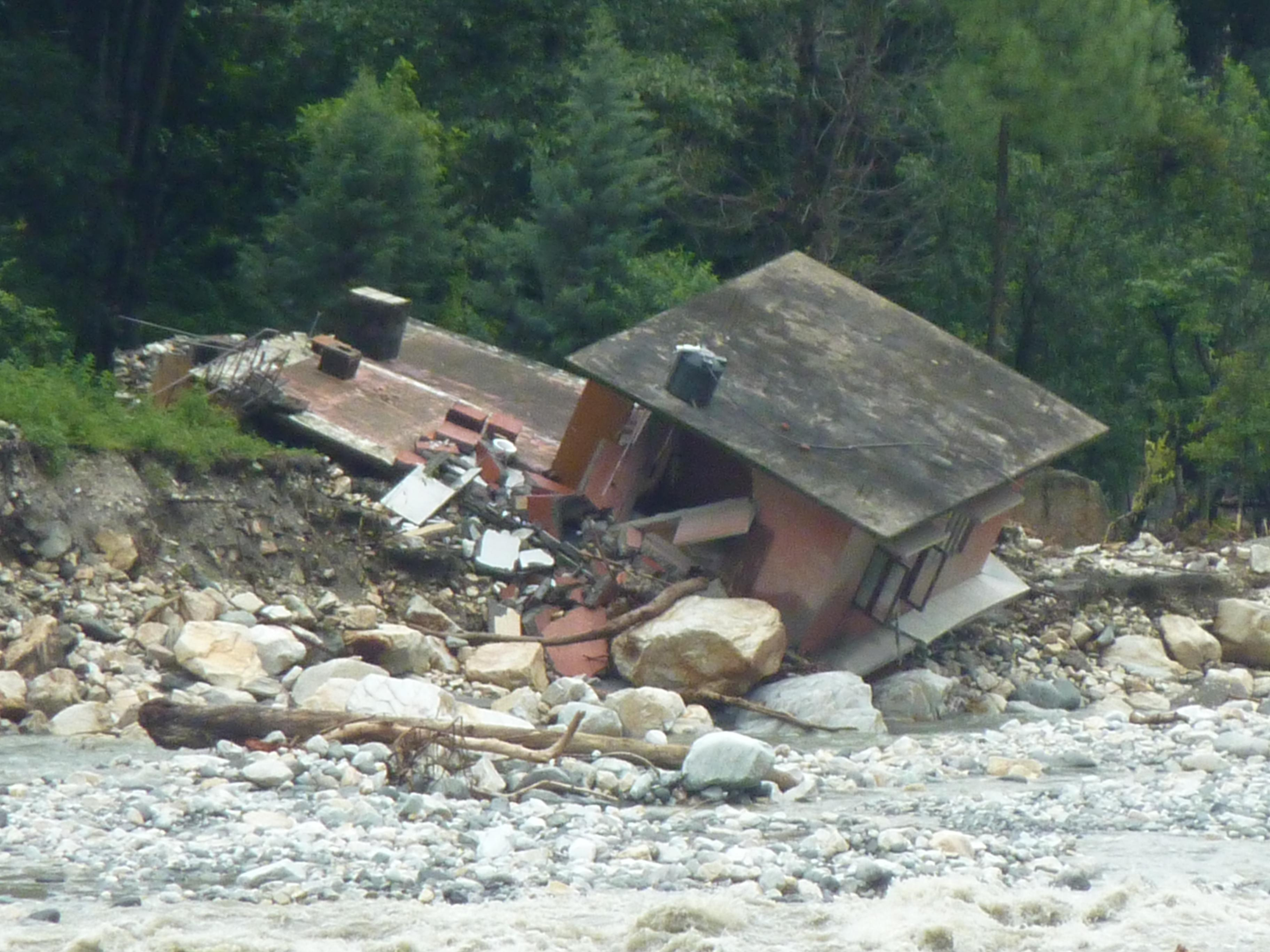
Effects in Uttarakhand

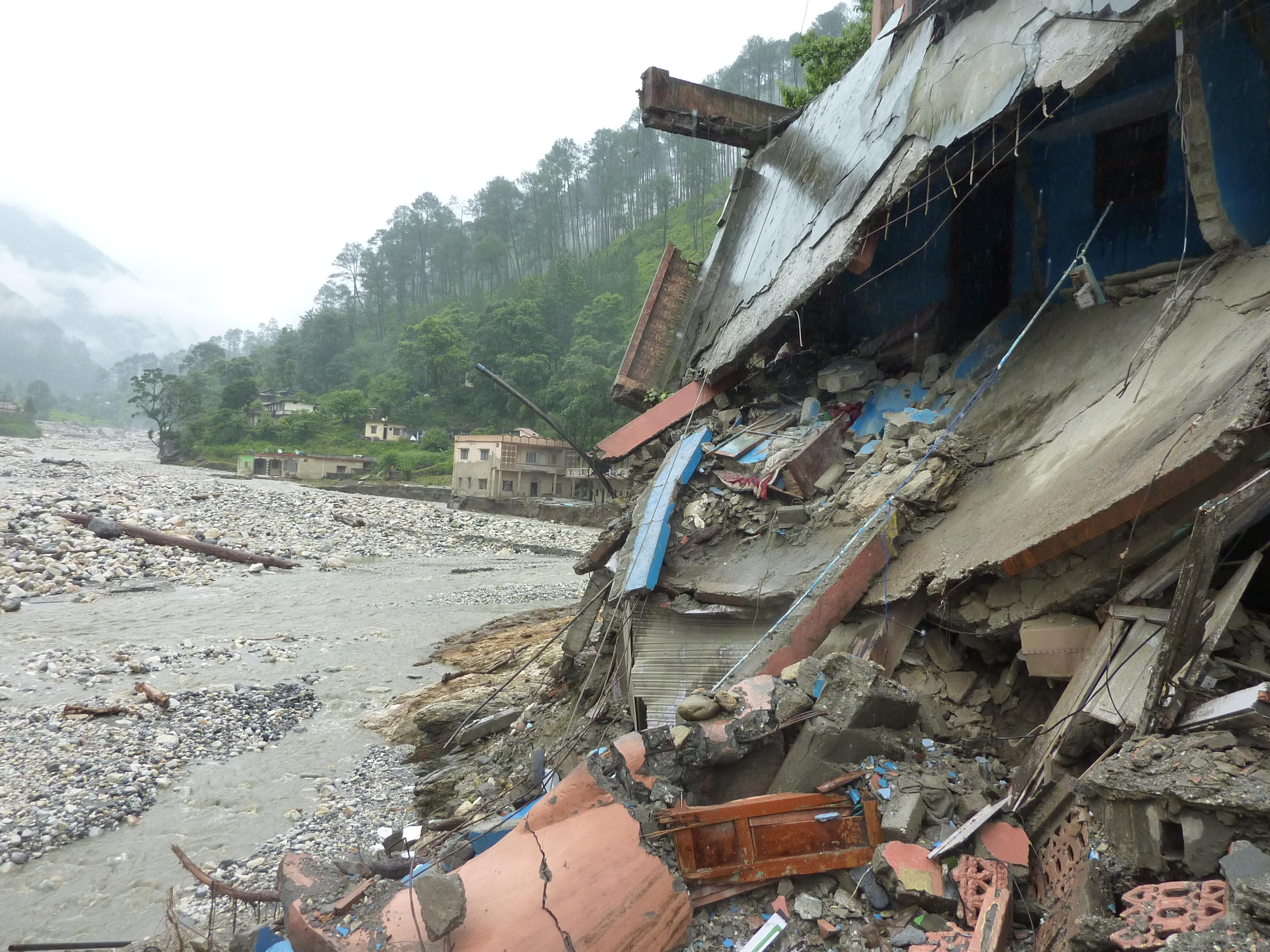
Effects in Uttarakhand

2012 Himalayan flash floods are the floods that occurred on the midnight of 3 August 2012 in the Himalayan region of Northern Indian states. Many were dead and missing. Many places were affected. Landslides and flash floods were triggered by a sudden cloudburst which left 31 people dead while 40 are reported to be missing.

== Details ==
The following are the states that were affected by the torrential rain that resulted in flash floods.

=== Uttarakhand ===
Uttarakhand was the state that was most affected by the torrential rain. Ten people died and 38 others are missing as a result of the flash floods. Several houses were washed away and the Char Dham yatra has been suspended leaving the pilgrims stranded. 19 labourers at the Assi Ganga hydel power project are reported to be missing in the Uttarkashi region. Nearly 30 homes have been washed away in the Garhwal region after the Gangotri bridge collapsed. A major chunk of the Gangotri National Highway has also been washed away. Indo-Tibetan Border Police and the Uttarakhand state disaster management forces are currently involved in the rescue operations in the Uttarkashi region. "Nearly 2000 people have been affected by the floods. 200 families have been evacuated from low lying regions of Uttarkashi to higher ground", said the Chief Minister of Uttarakhand Vijay Bahuguna. Two children were killed in a house collapse in the Karnaprayag area of Chamoli district. Another child was washed away in the flash floods at Pokhri area of the district where landslides continued, blocking the highways leading to Badrinath. In the Gangotri area, Bhagirathi is reported to be flowing above the danger level with people being evacuated to safer areas.

=== Himachal Pradesh ===
Flash floods hit the Palchan region in Himachal Pradesh. Two bridges and a road which connects Manali to Rohtang were washed away on the night of 4 August 2012. About 120 people have been evacuated from the affected areas. A government school, an under construction hydropower project and many electricity poles were also washed away in the floods.

=== Uttar Pradesh ===
Water logging occurred in the district of Moradabad.

=== Jammu and Kashmir ===
The Kathua district in Jammu and Kashmir was affected as water levels in the Ujh River rose. Twenty-three people were rescued and 90 families living near the Chenab were evacuated.

== Effects ==
Business Standard reported that the Northern Grid, which collapsed on 30 and 31 July, would be likely to come under renewed pressure as the power generation in Uttarakhand was stopped due to flash floods. The major hydel power projects were shut down following torrential rains that hit the state. In Uttarkashi district, the flash floods have caused damage to three state-run small hydel projects, which are controlled by Uttarakhand Jal Vidyut Nigam Ltd, resulting in their shut down. Due to the shut down, Uttarakhand would fall short of 18–20 million units per day during a monsoon season.
