= Ronti =

Mountain in Uttarakhand, India

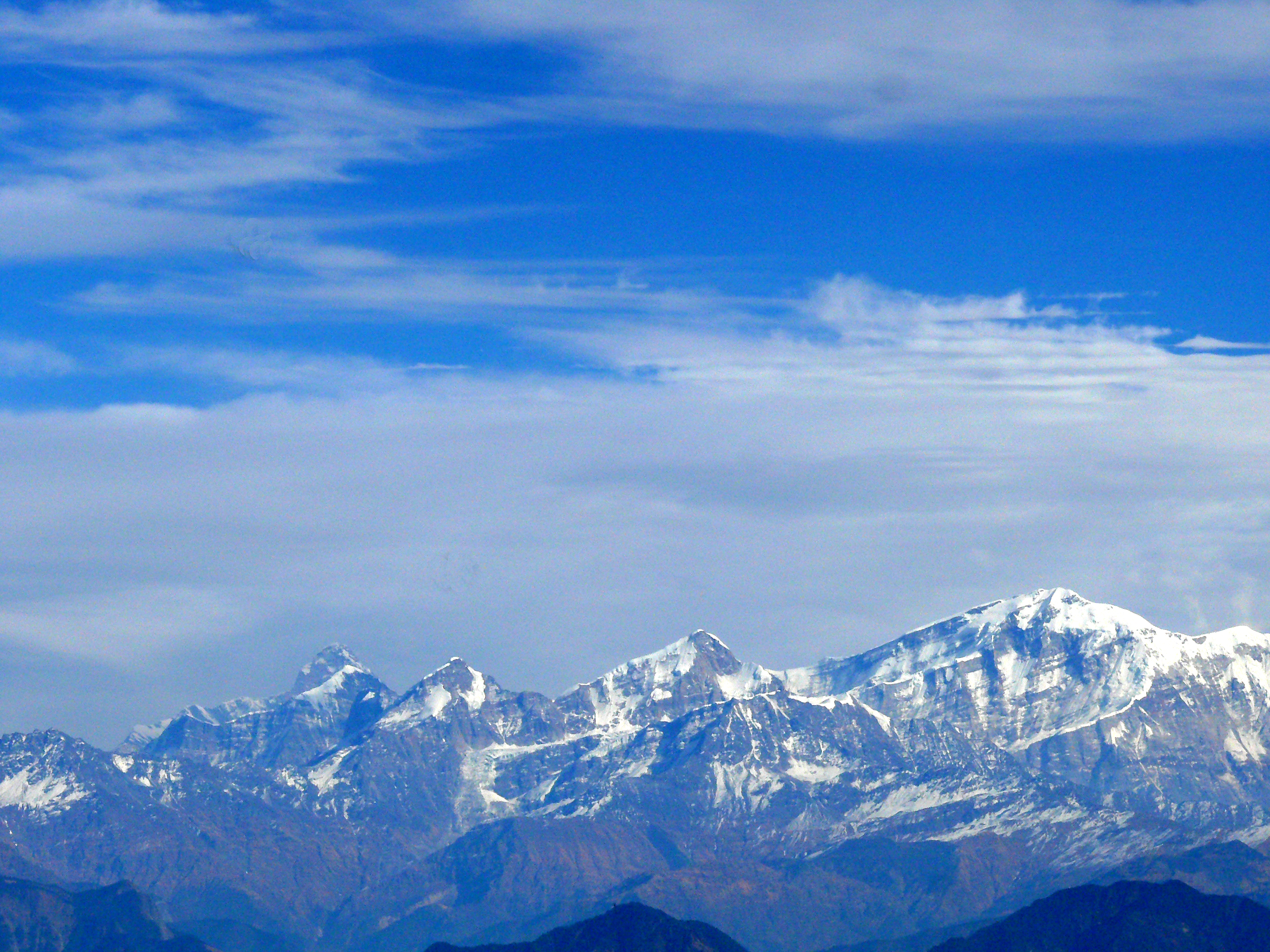
- From right Trishul, Nanda Ghunti, Ronti, Bethartoli and Nanda Devi from Kartik Swamy

Highest point
- Elevation: 6,063 m (19,892 ft)
- Prominence: 435 m (1,427 ft)
- Coordinates: 30°22′09″N 79°43′10″E

Geography
- Location within Uttarakhand
- Location: Chamoli district Uttarakhand, India
- Parent range: Garhwal Himalaya

Climbing
- First ascent: Peter Aufschnaiter and George Hampson in June 1955.

Ronti is a mountain of the Garhwal Himalaya in Uttarakhand India. It is situated on the western rim of Nanda Devi Sanctuary. The elevation of Ronti is 6,029 metres (19,780 ft) and its prominence is 435 metres (1,427 ft). It is 164th highest located entirely within the Uttrakhand. Nanda Devi, is the highest mountain in this category. It lies 2.4 km North of Nanda Ghunti 6,272 metres (20,577 ft) its nearest higher neighbor. Bethartoli 6,352 metres (20,840 ft) lies 6.6 km ENE and it is 8.4 km NNW of Trisul I 7,120 metres (23,360 ft). It lies 24.2 km west of Nanda Devi 7,816 metres (25,643 ft).

== Climbing history ==
The first known attempt on Ronti was made by P.L.Wood's team in 1945 during their attempt on Nanda Ghunti.

The known first ascent of Ronti was made by Peter Aufschnaiter and George Hampson on June 5, 1955. They started their trek from Nandaprayag. They march through the Nandakini valley and crossed the Humkum Gala, 17,170 ft and climbed a pass separating Ronti from Nanda Ghunti. On 5 June They started early 6 a.m. and reached the summit at 1 p.m. and return to the camp at 5-15 p.m.

The first ladies expedition to mountain from West Bengal led by Miss Deepali Sinha. The other members were Sudipta Sen Gupta, Lakshmi Pal, Swapna Nandy, Swapna Mitra, Shila Ghosh and Indira Biswas. Mrs. Sujaya Guha, accompanied the team as manager and Dr. Dipak Shinha was the only male member. They established Base Camp (13,500 feet) at Rajgher on October 19. They established three more camps. Camp I (15,000 feet) on the 21st, Camp II (16,500 feet) on the 23rd, and Camp III (18,200 feet) at the foot of the north face of Ronti on October 27. Miss Swapna Mitra and two Sherpas climbed the peak on 28 October 1967.

== Neighboring and subsidiary peaks ==
Neighboring or subsidiary peaks of Ronti:

- Nanda Devi: 7,816 m (25,643 ft)30°55′12″N 79°35′30″E
- Nanda Ghunti: 6,309 m (20,699 ft)30°20′54″N 79°43′06″E
- Trisul I 7,120 m (23,360 ft)30°18′36″N 79°46′12″E
- Bethartoli 6,352 m (20,840 ft)30°22′39″N 79°47′14″E
- Devistan I: 6,678 m (21,909 ft)30°20′24″N 79°52′48″E

== Glaciers and rivers ==
Nanda Ghunti Glacier flowing west to east and joins Ronti Glacier that flows south to north. both the glacier drains down through Ronti Gad and joins Dhauli Ganga that later joins Alaknanda at Vishnu Prayag. Alaknanda River is one of the main tributaries of river Ganga that later joins Bhagirathi River the other main tributaries of river Ganga at Devprayag and became Ganga there after.

== See also ==
- List of Himalayan peaks of Uttarakhand
