= Tapovan Vishnugad Hydropower Plant =

Tapovan Vishnugadh Dam
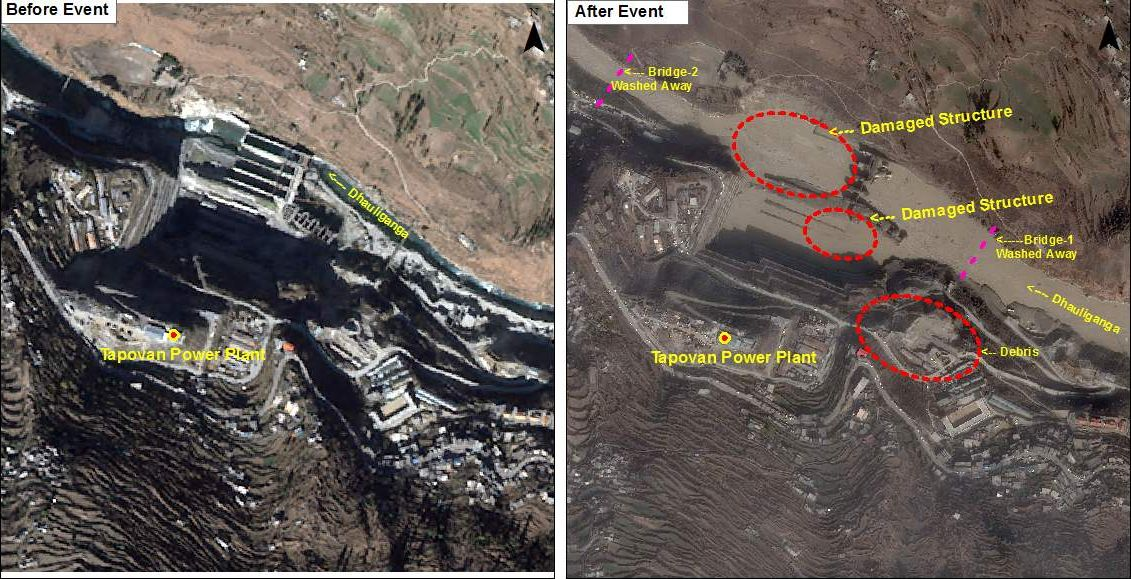
- The power plant before and after the flood

- Location within India
- Country: India
- Location: Chamoli District, Uttarakhand
- Coordinates: 30°29′38.9″N 079°37′39.1″E
- Purpose: Power
- Status: Under construction
- Construction began: November 2006
- Owner: NTPC Limited

Dam and spillways
- Type of dam: Concrete
- Impounds: Dhauliganga River

Tapovan Vishnugad Power Plant
- Coordinates: 30°32′08.2″N 079°31′09.9″E
- Commission date: 2020
- Turbines: 4 x 130 MW Pelton-type
- Installed capacity: 520 MW

The Tapovan Vishnugad Hydropower Plant is a 520 MW run-of-river hydroelectric project being constructed on Dhauliganga River in Chamoli District of Uttarakhand, India. The plant is expected to generate over 2.5 TWh of electricity annually.

Tapovan Vishnugad is NTPC's second hydro power project since its foray into the sector. The 520 MW run-of-the-river project is situated on river Dhauliganga in Chamoli district of Uttarakhand. Its journey started with NTPC entering into an understanding with the Govt. of Uttarakhand for feasibility study for the project on 31.12.2002 and then signing the Implementation Agreement on 23.06.2004. Currently, it is in advanced stage of construction with around 70% of the implementation completed. The project has set its target for commissioning in first half on FY 2020-21.

The Foundation Stone of TVHPP was laid by Shri P M Saeed, the then Union Minister for Power, on 14 February 2005 in the august presence of Shri ND Tiwari, CM of Uttarakhand.

The power plant is located downstream on the Alaknanda River and will contain four 130 MW Pelton turbine-generators. The barrage is being constructed across the Dhauliganga River and has a catchment area of 3,100 km^{2}.

BHEL was awarded the contract to supply four 130MW Pelton type turbines for the Tapovan Vishnugad hydroelectric power project. The contractual scope also included the testing, commissioning and operation of the generators, switchgear and excitation system. The project construction was awarded to a joint venture of Larsen & Toubro and Austria-based Alpine Mayreder Bau GmbH, but the contract was terminated in 2014 as geological constraints delayed tunnel construction. The tunnel project was then awarded to Hindustan Construction Company in 2016

== Flood damage ==
The dam, whilst still being under construction, was severely damaged on 7 February 2021 due to a flash flood caused by the Uttarakhand glacier burst; the avalanche lead to large amounts of water mixed with sand & stone rushing into the Dhauliganga River, which caused severe damage to the NTPC Tapowan project. 140 workers at the construction site died or went missing as a result of the disaster.

== Tapovan Vishnugad power plant details ==
The Tapovan Vishnugad power plant is a 520MW run-of-river project being constructed on Dhauliganga River in Chamoli District of Uttarakhand, India. The plant is expected to generate approximately 2,558GWh of electricity per year.

Construction of the hydroelectric power project began in November 2006. Power production from the plant was expected to begin in 2012, but sluggish tunnel excavation works and flash floods in June 2013 delayed its inauguration. The project is expected to commence operations in 2016.

NTPC is developing the project at an estimated cost of approximately INR 29.78bn ($677m).

The Tapovan Vishnugad hydropower project will consist of four 130MW Pelton turbines, and a barrage constructed across the Dhauliganga River. The barrage will be 200m-long and 22m-high, and will consist of four gates measuring 12m-high and 14m-wide each.

The reservoir is expected to create a catchment area of 3,100km2. It also includes an intake sill located at 5m above the riverbed, at an elevation of 1,787m.

The river water will be diverted into the head race tunnel (HRT) via a desilting basin. The HRT will have a diameter of 5.6m and a maximum discharge capacity of 122.2 m3/s. The tailrace tunnel will be 493m-long and will have a diameter of 7m.

A surge tank at the end of the head race tunnel will be installed to minimise the water hammer during operation. Two pressure shafts with a diameter of 3.6m each will emanate from the surge tank. Each shaft will be bifurcated into two branches of 2.6m diameter penstock and will be to feed water into the turbine.
