= Weather of 2023 =

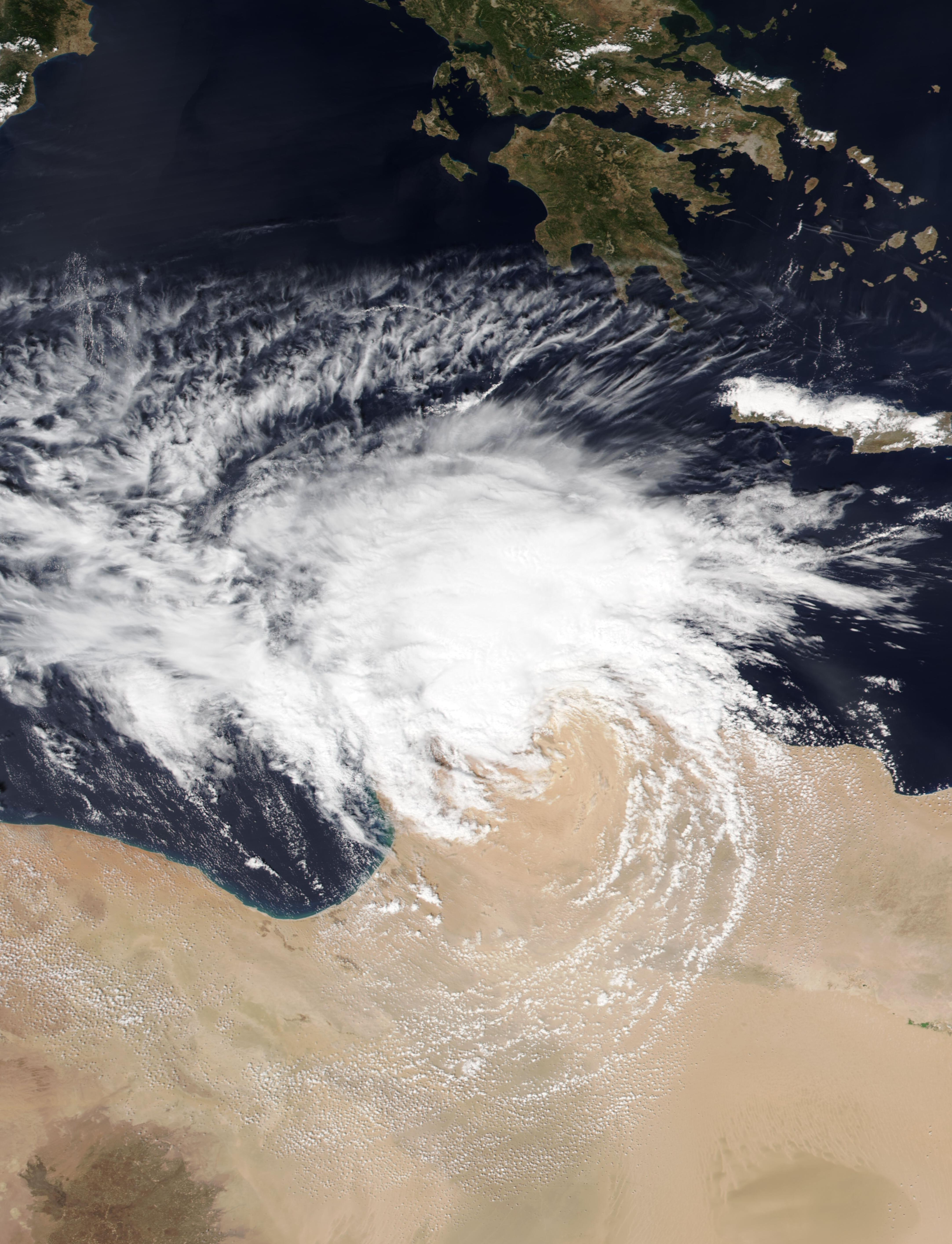
Storm Daniel, the deadliest weather event of the year, soon after landfall in Libya

The following is a list of weather events that occurred on Earth in the year 2023. The year saw a transition from La Niña to El Niño, with record high global average surface temperatures. There were several natural disasters around the world from various types of weather, including blizzards, cold waves, droughts, heat waves, wildfires, floods, tornadoes, and tropical cyclones. The deadliest weather event of the year was Storm Daniel, which caused catastrophic dam failures in Libya which lead to the deaths of over 5,900 people. The costliest weather event of the year was Typhoon Doksuri, which caused $28.5 billion in damages in China, the Philippines and Taiwan, becoming the costliest tropical cyclone outside of the North Atlantic basin. Another significant weather event was Cyclone Freddy, which became the longest lasting tropical cyclone on record, beating the previous mark of Hurricane John in 1994. The storm caused 1,434 fatalities, with most of the deaths coming from Malawi.

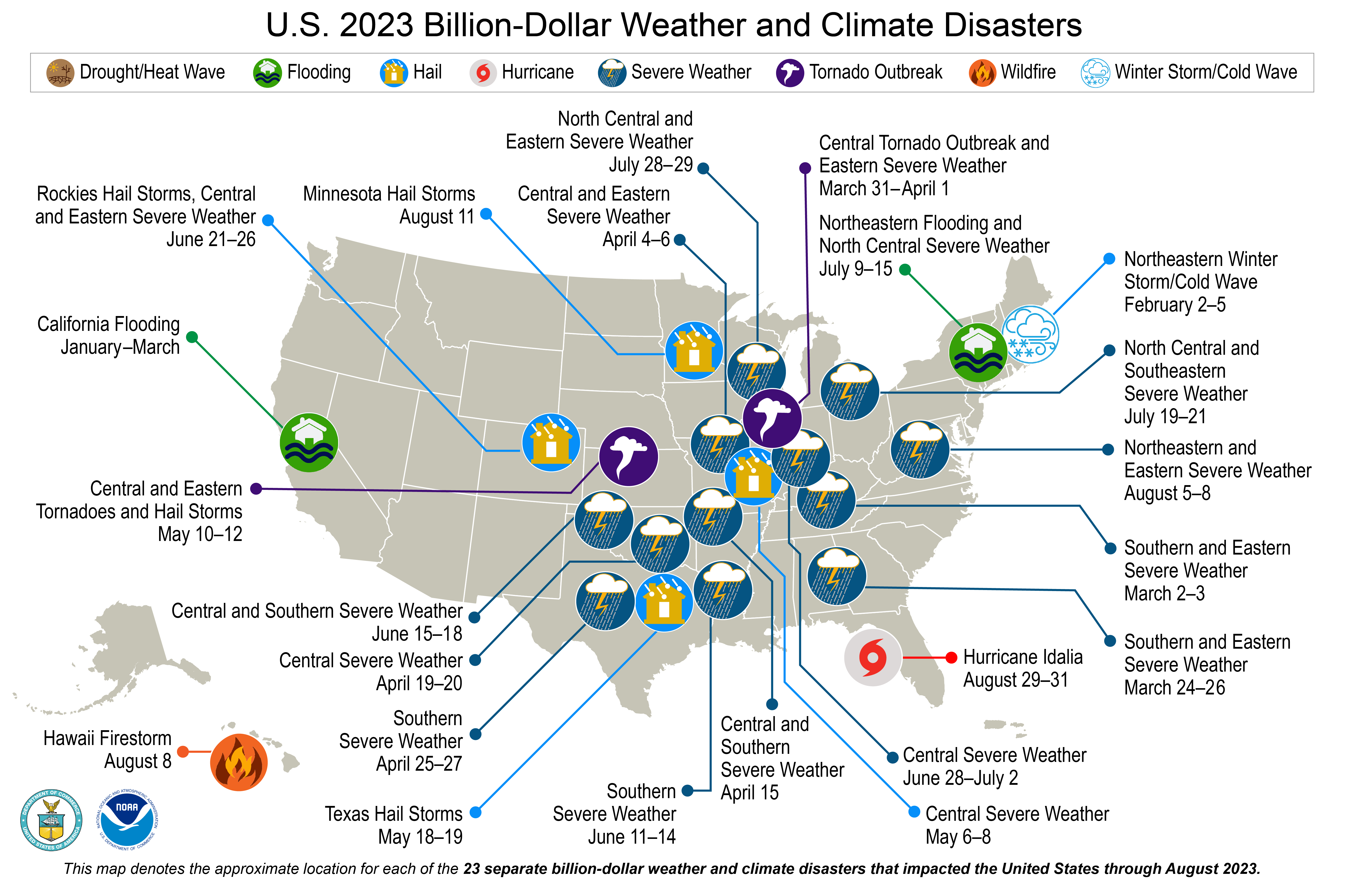
The 23 weather and climate disaster events in the United States with losses exceeding $1 billion in 2023

== Deadliest events ==
Deadliest meteorological events during 2023
Rank	Event	Date(s)	Deaths (+Missing)	Refs
1	2023 European heatwaves	June – September	47,000+	
2	Storm Daniel	September 4–12	5,951+ (10,100+ missing)	
3	Cyclone Freddy	February 4 – March 14	1,434 (19 missing)	
4	Western North America heat wave	May – present	695	
5	Cyclone Mocha	May 9–15	463 (≥101 missing)	
6	North India floods	July 10 – present	422 (38 missing)	
7	Afghanistan cold snap	January 10–17	166	
8	Pakistan floods	June 22 – July 6	159	
9	Typhoon Doksuri	July 20 – July 30	137	
10	Philippine floods	December 18, 2022 – February 5, 2023	97 (+25 missing)	

== Worst events ==
This is a list of weather events considered to be the most significant during 2023, in which reliable sources, surveys or academic assessments consider criteria such as, but not limited to: how impactful the event was, how deadly the event was, the impact on science, or other specific criteria. These events may be referred to as most important, most iconic, most significant, or the worst—but they are all considered key events in meteorology during the year.

Event	Date	Location	Notes	Cited survey(s)
2022–2023 California floods	December 26, 2022 – March 25, 2023	Southern California, the California Central Coast, Northern California and Nevada		
2023 Canadian wildfires	March–October 2023	Canada (all 13 provinces and territories)		
2023 Western North America heat wave	April–May 2023	Western North America		
2023 Emilia-Romagna floods	May 16–17, 2023	Emilia-Romagna, Italy		
2023 Hawaii wildfires	August 8–16, 2023	Hawaii (particularly the island of Maui)		
Hurricane Hilary	August 16–21, 2023	Western Mexico, Revillagigedo Islands, Baja California peninsula, Western United States		
Hurricane Idalia	August 26–September 8, 2023	Yucatán Peninsula, Cayman Islands, Western Cuba, Southeastern United States, Bermuda, Atlantic Canada		

== Types ==
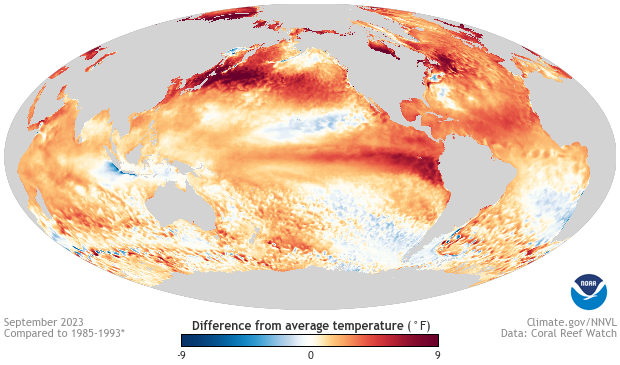
Map of sea surface temperature (SST) anomalies in the Pacific Ocean in September 2023, showing well above-normal SSTs east of the International Date Line (180°)

The following listed different types of special weather conditions worldwide.

=== Cold snaps and winter storms ===
In January, a cold snap in Afghanistan killed at least 166 people and more than 80,000 livestock. A national low temperature was set in Mohe City, China at −53.0 °C (−63.4 °F), on January 23. Two days later, snow fell in Algeria for the first time in ten years. In late January, an ice storm impacted the southern portion of the Great Plains, leading to closures on interstates 10, 30, 35W, and 40 after numerous car accidents being reported. 0.8 in (2.0 cm) of freezing rain fell near Llano, Texas, while 0.62 in (1.6 cm) of freezing rain fell west of Leander, Texas. Dallas, Texas set a daily snowfall record on January 31, at 1.3 in (3.3 cm). In early February, extremely cold temperatures made it into the Northeast, following an arctic front moving in by February 2. The front brought dangerously low wind chills to much of the region, with snow showers and snow squalls being reported. By February 3-4, temperature readings went down to the single digits above zero, with the lowest being −10 °F (−23 °C) to −20 °F (−29 °C). On February 4, Albany, New York saw a record low −13 °F (−25 °C), while a record low of −24 °F (−31 °C) was set at Glens Falls, New York. Also on February 4, Boston experienced a temperature of −10 °F (−23 °C), smashing the February 4 record of −2 °F (−19 °C) set in 1886. Portland, Maine had a record-cold wind chill of −45 °F (−43 °C). On Mount Washington's summit in New Hampshire, the wind chill hit −108 °F (−78 °C), the coldest ever recorded in the United States, with an air temperature of −46 °F (−43 °C) combined with wind speeds of 97 mph (156 km/h). In early March, a massive snowstorm in Arizona led to many pileups, with interstates 17, 40, and U.S. 93 closing down. Between 20 in (51 cm) and 30 in (76 cm) of snow fell in Arizona. The storm later moved to the Northeast, with snow emergencies being issued in the Albany metropolitan area and near Pittsfield, Massachusetts. 7.8 in (20 cm) of snow fell in Albany as a result of the winter storm. Later in March, a nor'easter hit New England between March 12–15, with 270,000 individuals losing power, low visibility leading to over 200 car crashes, and a temporary shutdown of Interstate 93 in New Hampshire. 32.3 in (82 cm) of snow fell in Hunter, New York, with the highest total recorded at 42.1 in (107 cm) near Readsboro, Vermont. In early April, a massive blizzard hit the Great Plains, with blizzard warnings stretching 800 mi (1,300 km), from Wyoming to Minnesota. Casper, Wyoming set a record of a one-day and two-day record for snowfall, at 26.7 in (68 cm) and 37.4 in (95 cm), with Atlantic City recording 48.8 inches (124 cm) of snow. Kenora, Ontario saw 27.2 cm (10.7 in) of snow, setting the snowfall record for April 5. Salt Lake City saw a record cold high, at only 33 °F (1 °C). Between May 1–2, Marquette, Michigan received 26.2 in (67 cm) of snow, with 19.8 in (50 cm) falling on May 1, which is the greatest calendar snowfall for the month of May for Michigan. In addition, a snow depth of 20 in (51 cm) was recorded on the morning of May 2, shattering records for snow depth in the month of May.

=== Heat waves and droughts ===
Starting in April 2023, a record-breaking heat wave in Asia has affected multiple countries, including India, China, Laos and Thailand. In the Western Mediterranean region, starting in Northern Africa, there was a three-day heatwave from April 26 to 28. The temperature reached up to 40 °C (104 °F) in parts of Morocco and Algeria. On April 27, at Córdoba Airport in Spain, the temperature reached 38.8 °C (101.8 °F), breaking the previous April record of 38.6 °C (101.5 °F) set in Elche. Additionally, this marked the hottest temperature recorded in all of Europe in the month of April. Other parts of Spain had very high temperatures, with Mora reaching 36.9 °C (98.4 °F).

=== Tornadoes ===
An early-season tornado outbreak in the Southern United States was responsible for eight deaths and 53 injuries. On January 24, an EF3 tornado struck Deer Park, Texas, causing a tornado emergency. A storm complex in late February caused several tornadoes including a tornado that hit Cheyenne, Oklahoma, that killed one. A rare tornado near Taif, Saudi Arabia killed one person and injured one more. Two separate tornado outbreaks between March 24–March 27 and March 31–April 1 caused 58 deaths and two EF4 tornadoes in the U.S.

=== Tropical and subtropical cyclones ===
The first named tropical cyclone of the year was Cyclone Hale, which caused minimal damage and one death in New Zealand as an extratropical cyclone. Later in January, Cyclone Cheneso killed at least 33 people in Madagascar and left 20 missing. In addition, it damaged over 13,000 houses and 18 medical centers. In February, Cyclone Freddy formed on February 4 and lasted until March 14, making it the longest lived tropical cyclone on record, surpassing Hurricane John of 1994, tracking across the entire Indian Ocean, the first to do so since Hudah and Leon-Eline in 2000. Freddy killed at least 1,434 people, and left 19 missing. In May, Cyclone Mocha formed and made landfall in Myanmar, killing 438 people and more than 101 missing. In June, Cyclone Biparjoy formed over the Arabian Sea and intensified into an extremely severe tropical cyclone, and made landfall in India, leaving at least 12 people dead.

=== Extratropical cyclones and European windstorms ===
Cyclone Helios which formed in early February brought recorded rain and humidity to Malta from 80 years. Luqa recorded rain with a total of 140.4 millimeters. meteo.it defined it as a Mediterranean tropical-like cyclone as it dissipated on February 11. Storm Otto, also known as Storm Ulf, brought high winds to the United Kingdom, Norway, and Germany. The highest wind gust was recorded in Cairngorms, UK, at 193 km/h (120 mph).

=== Wildfires ===
Over 100 wildfires have been confirmed in Alberta, Canada, and 13,000 people have been evacuated. The 2023 Hawaii wildfires killed over 110 people in the town on Lahaina, Hawaii.

== Timeline ==
This is a timeline of weather events during 2023.

=== January ===
In January 2023, the National Oceanic and Atmospheric Administration documented 30 weather-related fatalities and 162 weather-related injuries in the United States and Territories of the United States.

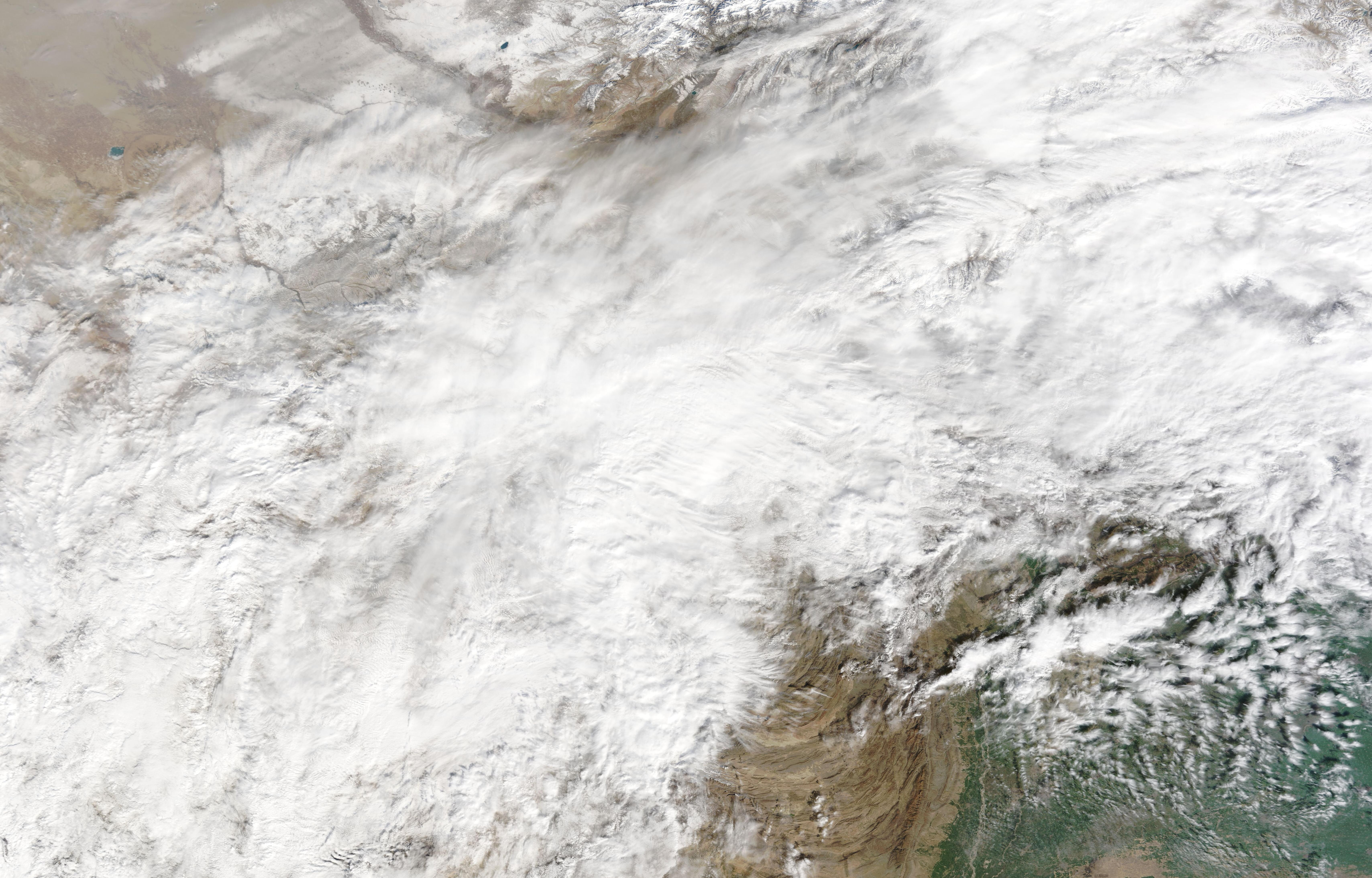
Severe weather causing a cold snap in Afghanistan on January 28

- November 2022–January 2023 – The rainy season in Malawi resulted in 42 fatalities from various severe weather incidents.
- December 26–January 25 — 2022–2023 California floods: A series of atmospheric rivers impacts California, killing 22 people and causing at least 200,000 power outages in the state.
- January 1 – A weather station in Abed, Denmark, measured the hottest temperature ever nationwide in the month of January, measuring 12.6 °C (54.7 °F), breaking the previous record of 12.4 °C (54.3 °F) from January 10, 2005.
- December 18, 2022 – February 5, 2023 — A shear line system caused flooding and landslides across the Philippines, killing 97 people with 25 more missing.
- January 4 — Heavy rains caused a house to collapse in Matala, Angola, with two people being killed.
- January 4–5 — Flooding and landslides in Buvaku, Democratic Republic of the Congo kills five people.
- January 6–8 — Flooding and landslides in Indonesia kills five people.
- January 10 — Flooding and landslides in Minas Gerais, Brazil kill six people.
- January 10–17 — A cold snap in Afghanistan kills at least 166 people and more than 80,000 livestock. The coldest temperature recorded was −33 °C (−27 °F) in the province of Ghor.
- January 12 — An early season tornado outbreak causes at least nine deaths in the Southern United States and several tornado emergencies.
- January 12 — A lightning strike in HaOgen, Israel kills a person walking their dog.
- January 13–16 — Heavy rains in Tijuana, Mexico, cause extreme flooding and a mudslide which killed two people.
- January 14 — A flash flood in Medellín, Colombia killed two people and injured 25 others.
- January 15 — Fatehpur, Rajasthan records a temperature of −4.7 °C (23.5 °F) from a cold wave.
- January 16 – Two EF1 tornadoes touch down in Iowa, the first tornadoes in the state in January since 1967.
- January 16 — A landslide in Locroja District, Peru kills three people and leaves three others injured.
- January 17 — An avalanche strikes Nyingchi, Tibet, killing 28.
- January 18–19 — Flooding and landslides in Brazil kill 3 and leave 2 missing.
- January 20 — Cyclone Cheneso leaves 33 dead and 20 missing in Madagascar.
- January 27–February 6 — Heavy amounts of rain struck Auckland and the upper North Island in New Zealand causing massive flooding resulting in 4 deaths and 3 injuries
- January 31 – Denmark had its wettest January on record, with a measurement of 123.6 mm (4.87 in) through the month, which beat the 123.0 mm (4.84 in) in January 2007 that previously held the record.
- January 31–February 2 — An ice storm kills 10 people and causes 500,000 power outages across the Southern United States.

=== February ===
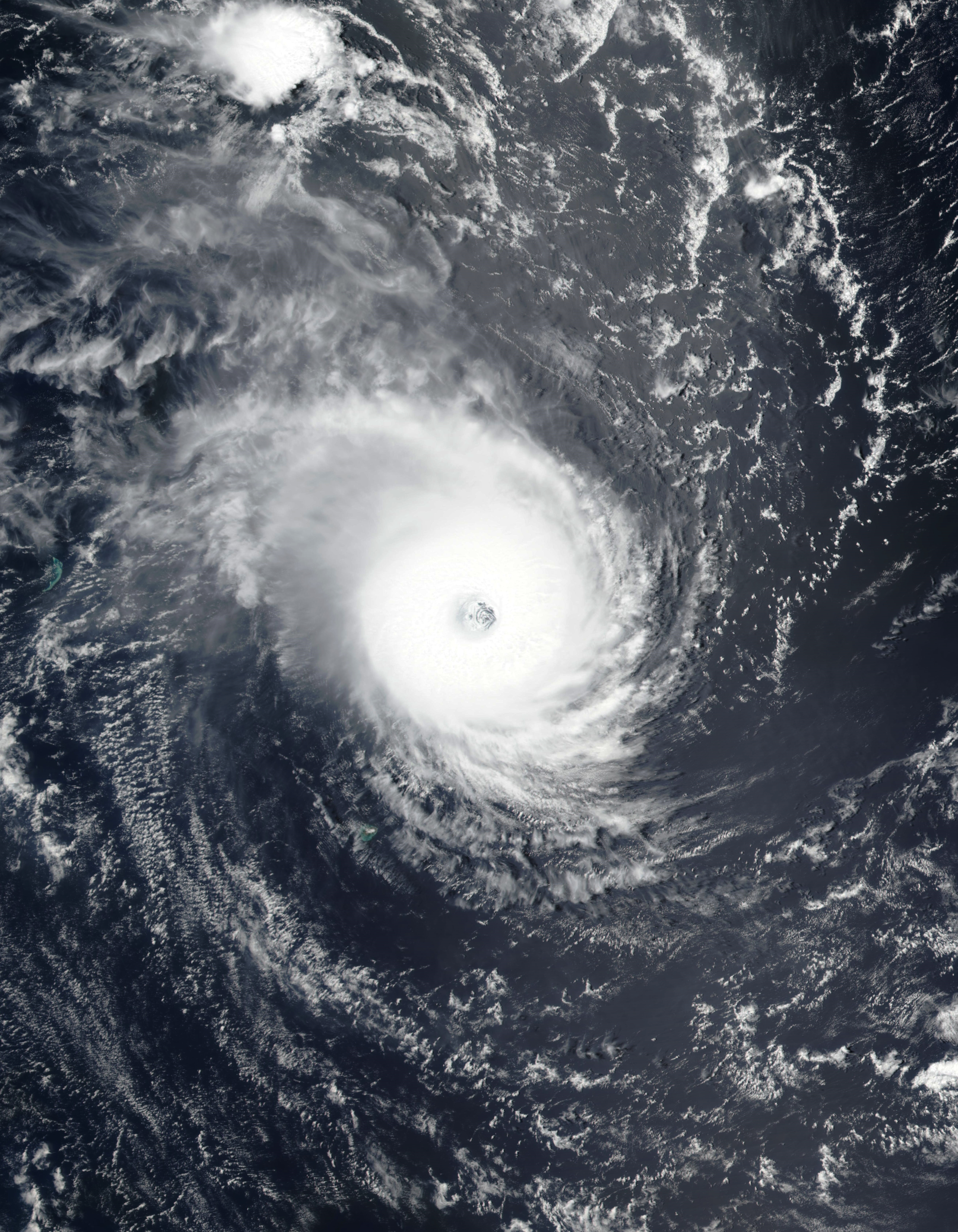
Cyclone Freddy at peak intensity on February 19

- February 1 – 0.4 in (1.0 cm) of snow falls in New York City, becoming the latest date for first measurable snow there. Despite the minimal snow, a ground stop was still issued at LaGuardia Airport.
- February 2 – Avalanche has buried a tourist near Mały Kościelec in Tatra Mountains, Poland. After a few days the men died.
- February 3–4 – A cold wave briefly hit New England and Canada. The wind chill on Mount Washington, New Hampshire, drops to −108 °F (−78 °C), marking the coldest wind chill ever recorded in the United States. The next day, the temperature of −10 °F (−23 °C) in Boston became the coldest day in the city since 1957.
- February 5–7 – In the Mariano Nicolás Valcárcel District, 15 died from landslides that occurred after heavy rains.
- February 4 – March 14 – Cyclone Freddy forms in the eastern Indian Ocean and makes landfall in Madagascar and Mozambique, becoming only the fourth storm to cross the entire Indian Ocean. Additionally, it was the longest lasting tropical cyclone on record with a duration of 5 weeks and 3 days, and holds the record for the highest accumulated cyclone energy (ACE) of any tropical cyclone of 87.01. 238 people die in Madagascar and Mozambique and over 1,200 people were killed in Malawi from extreme flooding and mudslides.
- February 10 – Widespread record highs were broken across the Eastern United States, ranging from 47 °F (8 °C) in Saint Johnsbury, Vermont, to 80 °F (27 °C) in portions of North Carolina.
- February 11–15 – Cyclone Gabrielle struck New Zealand particularly in the Gisborne and Hawkes Bay areas leaving 11 people dead while +3 are currently missing. Making it the most destructive cyclone in New Zealand since 1988.
- February 16 – Record warm temperatures occur in the Eastern United States. Islip, New York, Bridgeport, Connecticut, Bedford, Massachusetts, and Newport, Rhode Island, all set record highs for the month of February. The record in Newport was broken by 6 °F (4 °C). At LaGuardia Airport, the low of 54 °F (12 °C) tied for the warmest low on record, while Central Park observed a low of 56 °F (13 °C), the second warmest February low on record.
- February 18–23 – Floods and mudslides kill at least 65 people across the state of São Paulo in Brazil.
- February 21–28 – A major storm complex caused almost a million power outages throughout the United States, with Michigan being the most affected, with an ice storm that left at least one dead in Michigan when a power line fell on a volunteer firefighter.

=== March ===
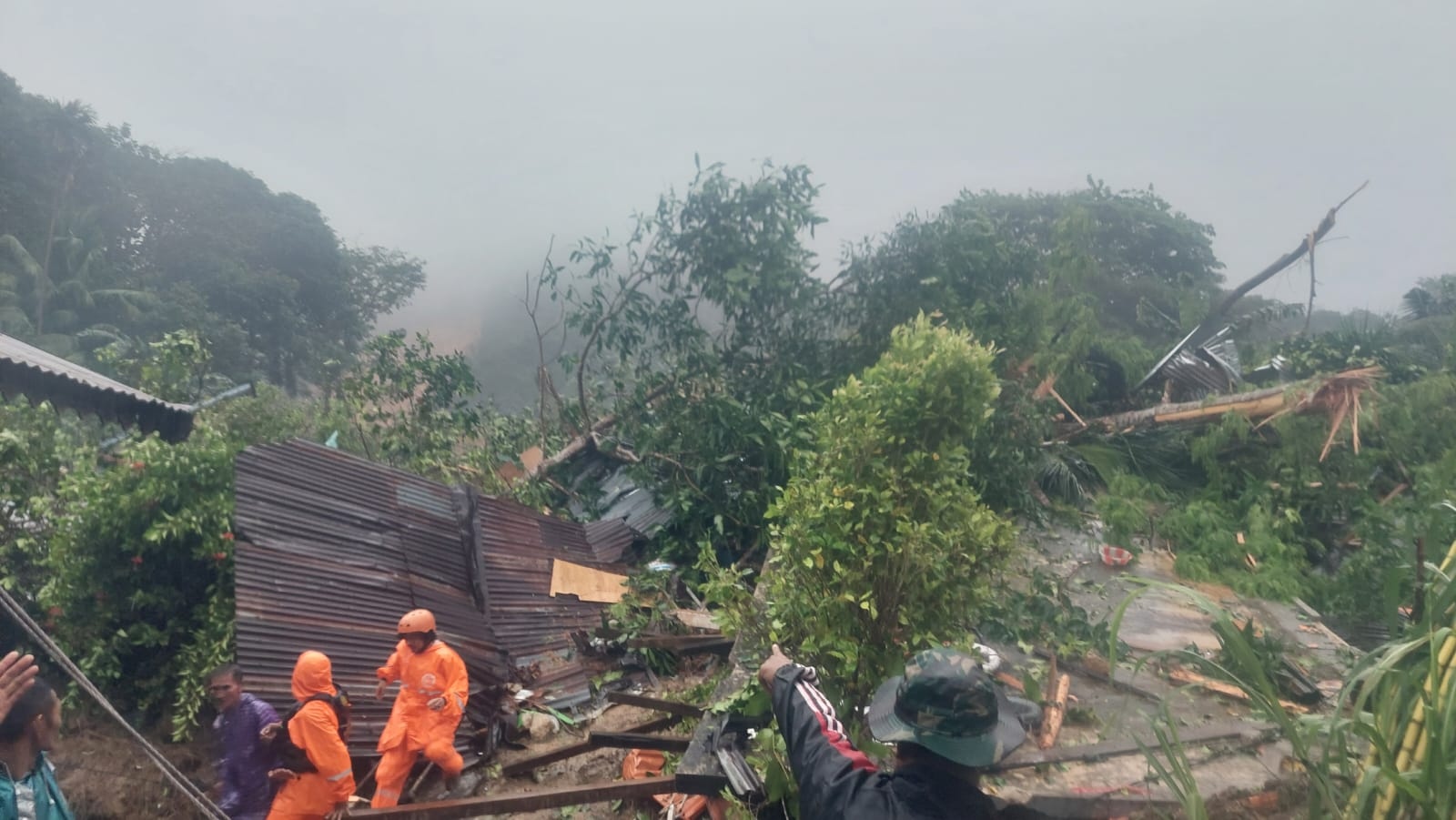
The aftermath of the 2023 Serasan landslide

- March 1–3 – A storm complex containing both severe thunderstorms and heavy snowfall killed at least 13 people across the United States, including five in Kentucky, three in Alabama, two in Tennessee, one in Arkansas, and one in Mississippi.
- March 6 – A landslide in Natuna Regency, Indonesia kills at least 50 people and four others remain missing.
- March 7–20 – At least eight people were killed by Cyclone Yaku in Peru and Ecuador.
- March 9–10 – Two people were killed and 9,400 were under evacuation orders as continuing atmospheric rivers brought heavy rains and flooding to parts of California.
- March 15 – 16 deaths were reported as massive flash floods struck the Turkish provinces of Adiyaman and Sanliurfa, turning streets into rivers. These areas had been particularly hit hard by the past earthquakes.
- March 21–22 – 5 died in California from high winds by a bomb cyclone that also caused two tornadoes, including one in Montebello.
- March 22–25 – 14 died in the town Baardhere, Jubaland state, Somalia, when flash floods hit the area.
- March 24–26 – 26 people were killed in a tornado outbreak in the Southern United States.
- March 26 – 11 were killed and 67 were left missing by a landslide caused by heavy rains that occurred in Alausí, Ecuador.
- March 31–April 1 – At least 26 people are killed in a tornado outbreak in the United States.

=== April ===
- April 3 – Casper, Wyoming, saw its snowiest day on record, with 26.7 in (68 cm) of snow falling.
- April 5 – An EF2 tornado hits the town of Glen Allen, Missouri, killing five people.
- April 12–13 – Heavy rains affected Fort Lauderdale and South Florida, causing significant flooding.
- April 14 – A temperature of 96 °F (36 °C) at Windsor Locks, Connecticut, tied the state record for warmest April temperature. Additionally, a temperature of 90 °F (32 °C) in Worcester, Massachusetts, became the earliest date for a ninety degree day.
- April 19 – Tornadoes struck throughout the U.S. central plains, including a fatal EF3 tornado in Cole, Oklahoma. The outbreak lead to 3 fatalities.
- April 21 – A significant tornado struck the Aung Myin Kone and Tadau villages near Myanmar's capital Naypyitaw, killing at least 8 people and injuring at least 128. At least 232 homes were also destroyed by the tornado.
- April 22 - Gusty and strong winds in Pennsylvania lead to falling trees that killed 2 people.
- April 27 — The hottest April temperature in Europe occurred, with the temperature in Córdoba, Spain at 38.8 °C (101.8 °F).
- April 29 — A microburst in Texas caused “tens of millions of dollars” in damage.

=== May ===
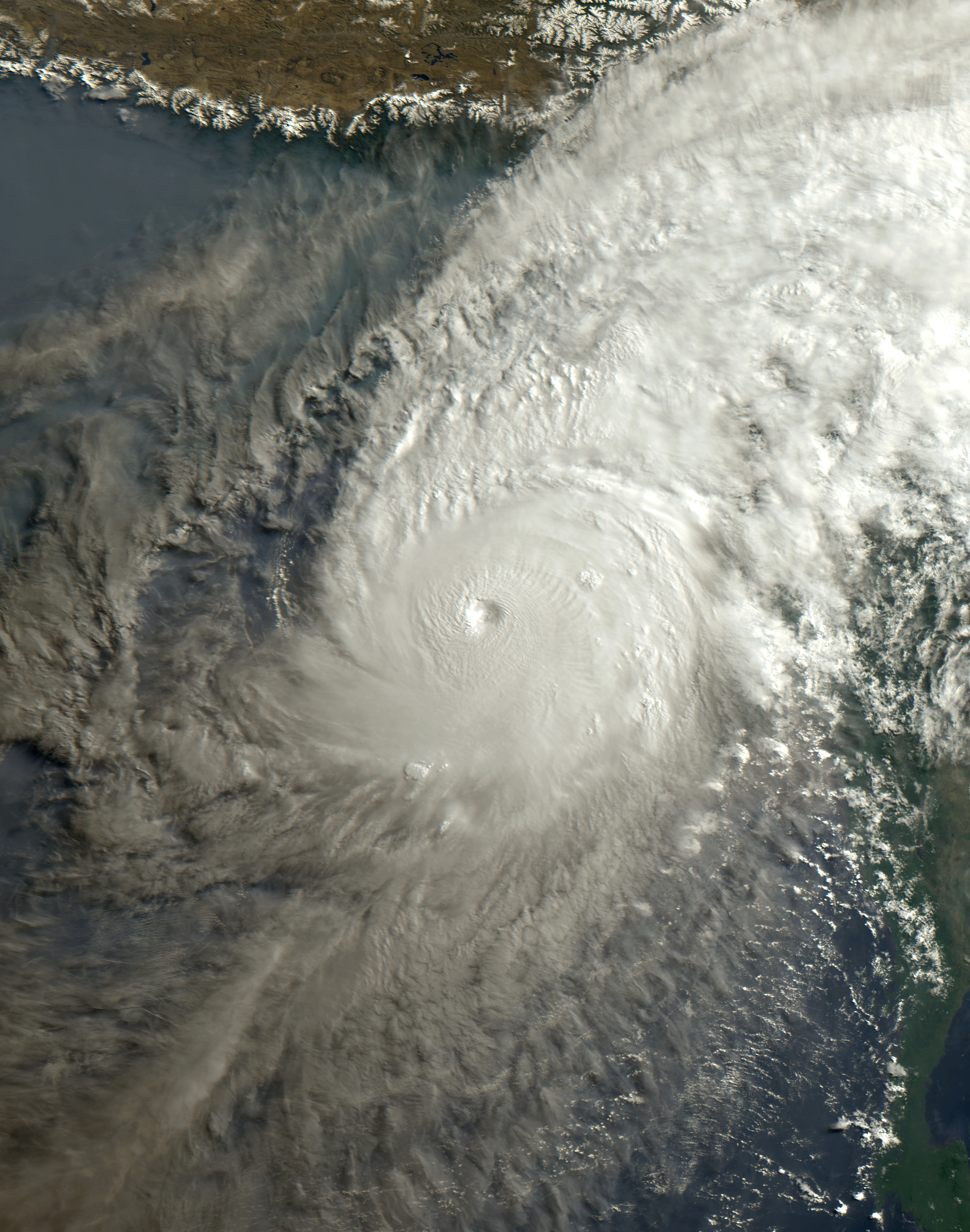
Cyclone Mocha at peak intensity on May 14

- May 3 – present — Floods in East Africa, especially in the DRC and Rwanda killed 440 and 129 respectively.
- May 9 – Flooding caused a state of emergency in Auckland. 1 person was swept away by floodwaters in the Abbey Caves.
- May 14–15 — Cyclone Mocha impacted Myanmar and Bangladesh, killing 438 people in total.
- May 15 – Lightning kills one person and injured another in Texas.
- May 16 – While in Cyclone Fabien, the Lu Peng Yuan Yu fishing vessel capsizes in the Indian Ocean. 16 of the 39 people on board have been confirmed dead.
- May 16 – 17 — 17 people died and ten of thousands were left homeless in devastating floods in the Emilia-Romagna region of northern Italy.
- May 18 - Many daily record lows were set across the Northeastern United States, including Trenton, New Jersey, at 37 °F (3 °C), Montpelier, Vermont, at 25 °F (−4 °C), Lebanon, New Hampshire, at 23 °F (−5 °C), Bridgeport, Connecticut, at 38 °F (3 °C), Providence, Rhode Island, at 33 °F (1 °C), and Akron, Ohio, at 32 °F (0 °C). A temperature of 17 °F (−8 °C) became the coldest temperature so late in the year in Saranac Lake, New York, while Allentown, Pennsylvania, recorded their third latest freeze on record. This cold snap lead to several damaging frosts and freezes in Upstate New York.
- May 19 – June 3 – Typhoon Mawar kills two people in Guam, one person in the Philippines, one person in Taiwan and two people in Japan.
- May 23 – Two people were killed in a storm in Texas.
- May 28 – A tourist boat sinks on Lake Maggiore in northern Italy, killing four.
- May 29 – Shanghai records its hottest ever May temperature, at 36.1 °C (97.0 °F).
- May 29 – Wildfires in Nova Scotia cause 16,000 to evacuate.
- May 30 – A landslide in the southwestern Sichuan province, China, kills 19.

=== June ===
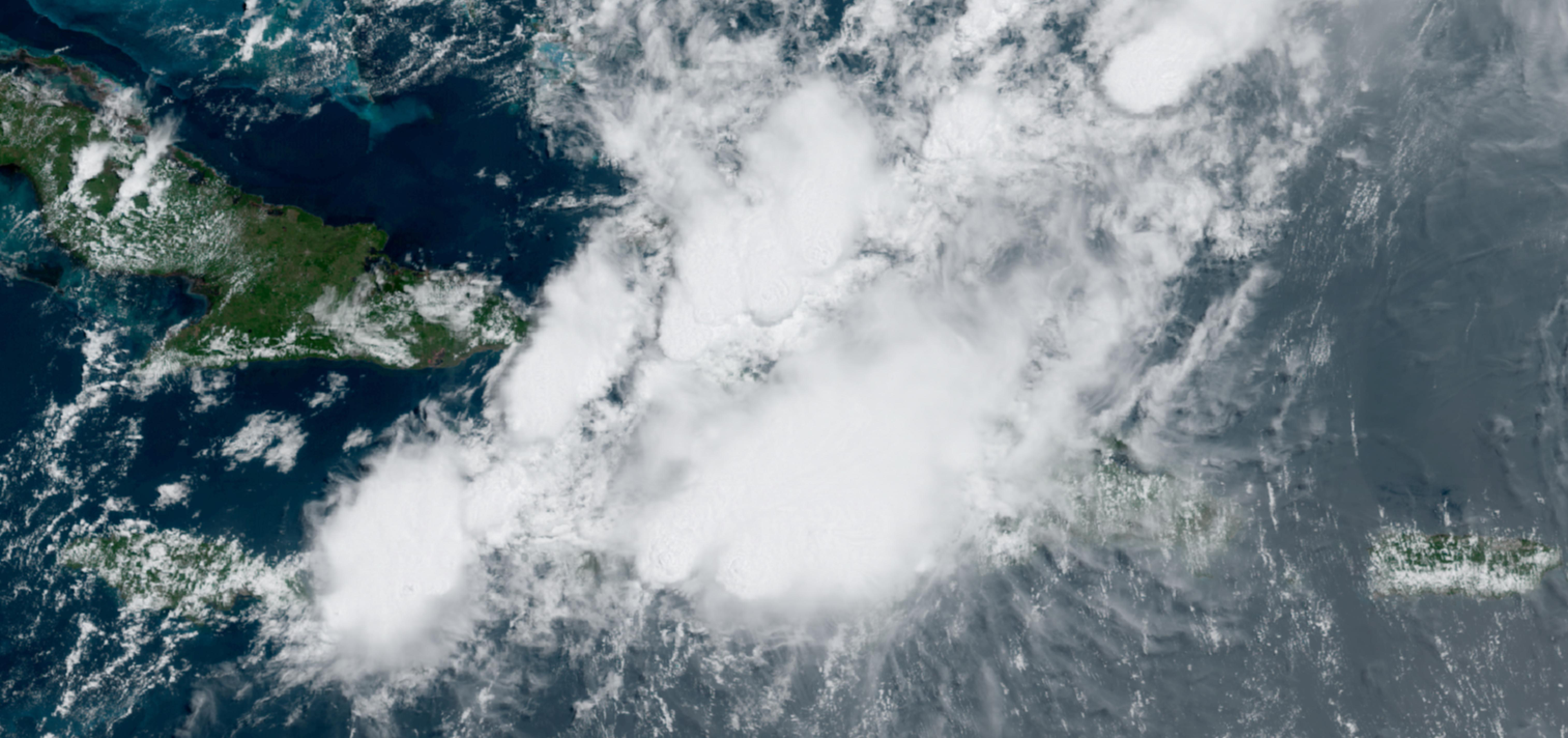
The system responsible for the Haiti floods on 3 June

- June 1–2 – Record heat affects portions of the Northeastern United States, with Burlington, Vermont, seeing a high of 96 °F (36 °C), the warmest temperature so early in the season there. The next day, daily records were set in Hartford and Philadelphia.
- June 1 - Temperatures in Lapland, Finland reached −7.7 °C (18.1 °F), the coldest June temperature in the country.
- June 2–4 – Floods in Haiti cause 51 deaths and injure 140 people. Additionally, over 13,500 homes were flooded and 820 were destroyed.
- June 6–19 – Cyclone Biparjoy becomes the longest-lived cyclone in the Arabian Sea and kills 12 people in Gujarat.
- June 8–9 – Windstorms and floods in Iran kill seven and leave 59 injured.
- June 10 – Heavy rains in northeast Pakistan kills 25 and leaves 145 injured.
- June 14–19 – A widespread tornado outbreak sequence leaves five dead and 120 injured
  - A low-end EF3 tornado damages or destroys nearly 200 homes in Perryton, Texas.
  - In Jasper County, Mississippi, over a dozen buildings were destroyed and one person was killed by an EF3 tornado.
- June 17–18 – Floods and landslides in Nepal kill at least six and leave 28 missing.
- June 20 – Two Texas cities broke all-time record high temperatures, with San Angelo reaching 114 °F (46 °C) and Del Rio reaching 113 °F (45 °C). Air conditioning pushed ERCOT power demand to a record 81.2 GW.
- June 20–26 – A second widespread tornado outbreak sequence across the United States leaves over 100 injured and eight dead.
  - An EF3 tornado in Matador, Texas, kills four people and destroys over ten buildings.
  - An EF2 tornado in Martin and Dubois County, Indiana, leaves one dead and another person injured.
  - At George Bush Intercontinental Airport, a record gust of 97 mph (156 km/h) was observed, surpassing the airport's previous highest gust of 82 mph (132 km/h) during Hurricane Ike.
- June 22 – July 6 – Monsoon rains in Pakistan kill 55 people, including at least eight children.
  - June 25 – Ten people are killed from lightning strikes in Punjab province, Pakistan.
- June 27 – Flash flood induced landslides in the Miansi and Weizhou townships in Sichuan province, China, result in four deaths and three missing people.
- June 29 – Authorities in Mexico have said that within the past two weeks, over 100 people have died from heat related deaths as temperatures have came close to 50 °C (122 °F).
- June 30 – Heavy rain and a tornado in KwaZulu-Natal, South Africa leaves at least seven people dead another seven missing.

=== July ===
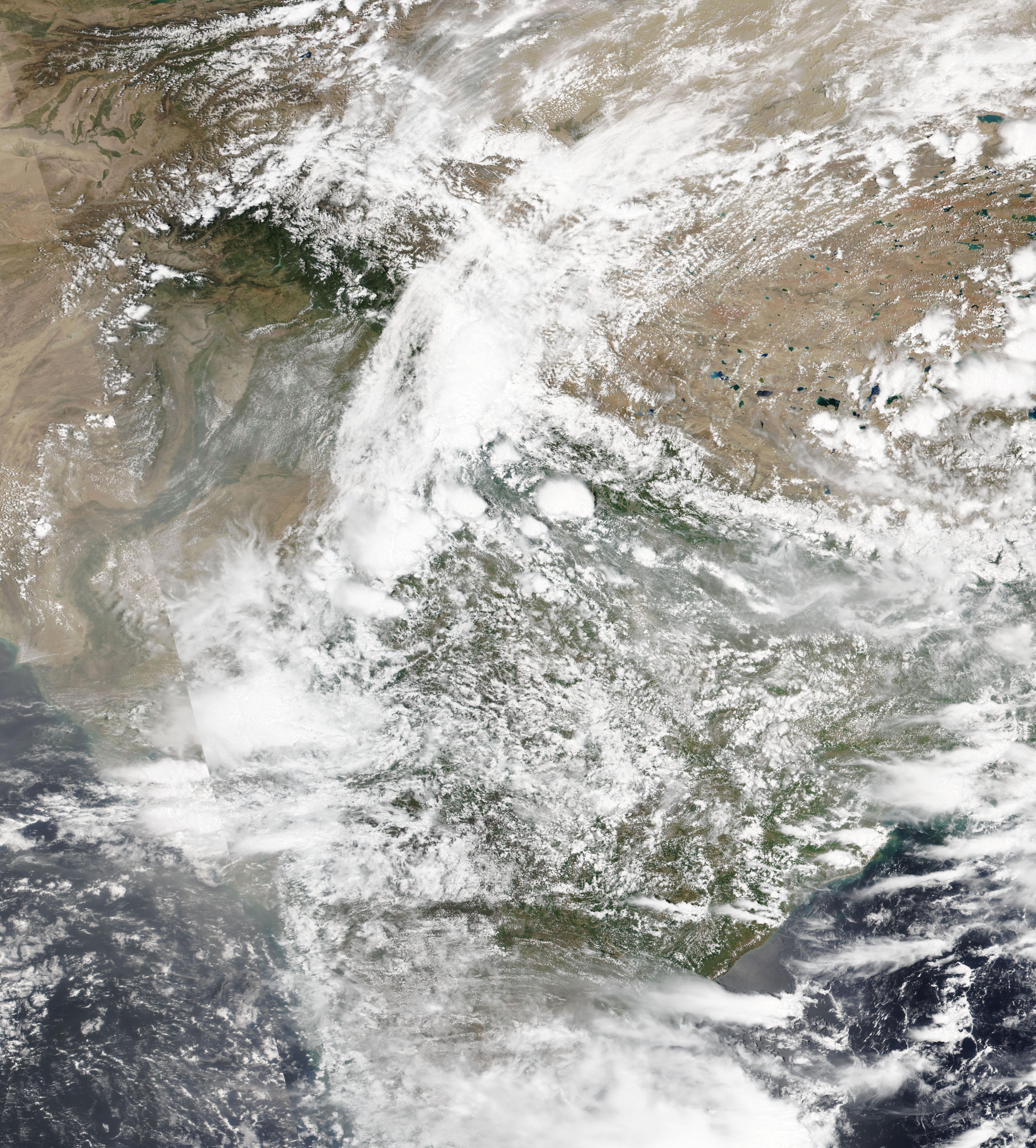
The flood systems responsible for the North India floods on 10 July

- July 1–7 – The World Meteorological Organization find that the first week of July was the hottest week recorded during an El Niño which was worsened by climate change. The record was broken twice and equaled once in that week.

Date	Average global temperature
Monday, July 3	17.01 °C (62.62 °F)
Tuesday, July 4	17.18 °C (62.92 °F)
Wednesday, July 5	17.18 °C (62.92 °F)
Thursday, July 6	17.23 °C (63.01 °F)

- July 3–present – Monsoon rains cause record-breaking and destructive floods in North India, killing over 100.
  - July 9 – The capital of India, New Delhi, receives its wettest July day in over 40 years, receiving 153 mm (6.0 in) of rain.
  - July 19 – A landslide in Raigad kills at least 16 people with another 100 feared dead under debris.
- July 9–16 – Flash flooding in the Northeastern United States kills at least eight people and leaves two children missing.
- July 10 – Torrential rain in southern Japan cause landslides that kill three people.
- July 13–18 – Tropical Storm Talim leaves three dead across the Philippines and Southern China.
- July 16 - Monsoon flooding in South Korea kill at least 41 people and 9 missing.
- July 17 – Torrential rains cause a landslide in Quetame, Colombia leaves 14 dead.
- July 18 – Phoenix recorded their warmest ever low temperature on record, at 97 °F (36 °C).
- July 19 – A severe storm sweeps through the western Balkans, killing five people.
- July 19–29 – Typhoon Doksuri causes at least 87 deaths and over $2 billion in damages.
  - July 27 – The MB Aya Express capsizes in the Philippines, killing 27.
  - July 27–29 – Record-breaking floods in China result in 30 deaths and $2 billion in damages.
- July 22 – Another severe storms hits Serbia killing three.
- July 24- Lightning in Upstate New York kills one person.
- July 25 – A nighttime storm in Lombardy, Italy leaves four dead.
- July 27 – August 11 – Typhoon Khanun kills at least two people in Okinawa.
- July 30 – In Mari El, Russia, severe storms leave ten dead at a campsite.

=== August ===
2023's June–July-August season was the warmest on record globally by a large margin, as El Niño conditions continued to develop.

- August 3–23 – Floods in Carinthia and Slovenia kill seven people.
- August 3 – 32 people are killed and one is left missing after a landslide in Shovi, Georgia.
- August 4-8 - Severe storms, mainly in the Eastern United States kill two people and result in over a million power outages.
- August 11 – Floods in Myanmar kills five.
- August 12 – A landslide in Xi'an, China, kills 21 people and leaves six missing.
- August 12 – Four people are killed by lightning strikes in separate incidents in Yemen.
- August 16–22 – Hurricane Hilary kills two people in Mexico and becomes the first tropical cyclone to bring tropical storm force winds to California since 1997. Additionally, four states in the United States break tropical cyclone rainfall records.
- August 20 – September 1 – Hurricane Franklin kills two people and leaves one missing in the Dominican Republic.
- August 22 – September 3 – Typhoon Saola kills one person in the Philippines.
- August 24–31 – Hurricane Idalia kills nine people in the Eastern United States after landfall in Florida.
- August 27 – September 6 – Typhoon Haikui leaves two dead in Taiwan and China.
- August 28–30 – Heavy rains in Tajikistan kills 21 people.
- August 28 – Severe wind gusts strikes a thermal spa in Podhájska, Slovakia, injuring one person. Wooden booths at the spa were obliterated and swept away, trees were uprooted, and a camper was overturned. Tomas Pucik, a meteorologist and forecaster with the European Severe Storms Laboratory (ESSL) conducted a scientific study on the wind gusts. The study rated the damage caused IF1.5 on the International Fujita scale, with winds estimated between 144 to 216 kilometres per hour (89 to 134 mph).

=== September ===
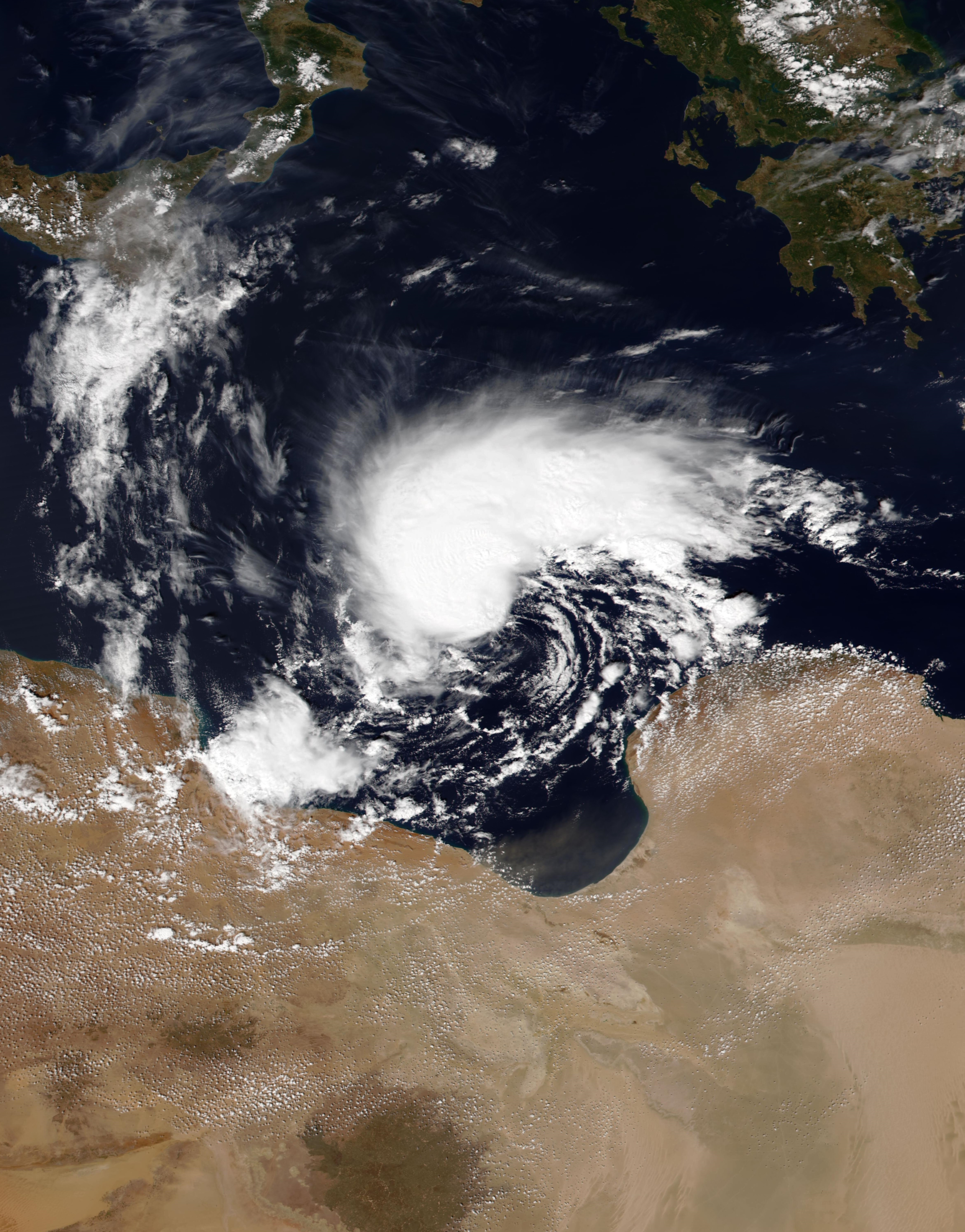
Storm Daniel soon before landfall in Libya

In September 2023, 20% of the earth's surface experienced new record high temperatures, the highest percentage of any month since the start of records in 1951.

- September 2 - Flooding in the Southwestern United States kills one person at the Burning Man festival.
- September 6 – A cyclone in Rio Grande do Sul causes floods that kill 21 people.
- September 7–8 – The remnants of Typhoon Haikui combined with a low pressure trough cause widespread flooding in Hong Kong, killing four and injuring nearly 150.
- September 4–11 – Storm Daniel causes catastrophic flooding across Libya and Southeast Europe, killing near 7,000 people and leaving 10,000 missing. Additionally, flooding in Greece is responsible for $2.14 billion in damages.
- September 11 - September 2023 northeastern U.S. floods - The city of Leominster, Massachusetts, declares a state of emergency after rain up to 11 in (280 mm) brought unprecedented flash flooding.
- September 19 – Three tornadoes, one rated as an EF3 tornado, hits Jiangsu in China. 10 people were killed.
- September 21–22 – Flooding hits New Zealand South Island causing a state of emergency in Queenstown and Southland with Queenstown recording its wettest day in 24 years and Wānaka recording its wettest day in 17 years.
- September 25 – Floods in Mexico and Guatemala kill 13 people and leave 22 missing.
- September 24–25 — Floods in the Western Cape province of South Africa kill at least 11 and leave over 80,000 without electricity.
- September 28–30 - New York City declares a state of emergency during major flooding in the city.

=== October ===
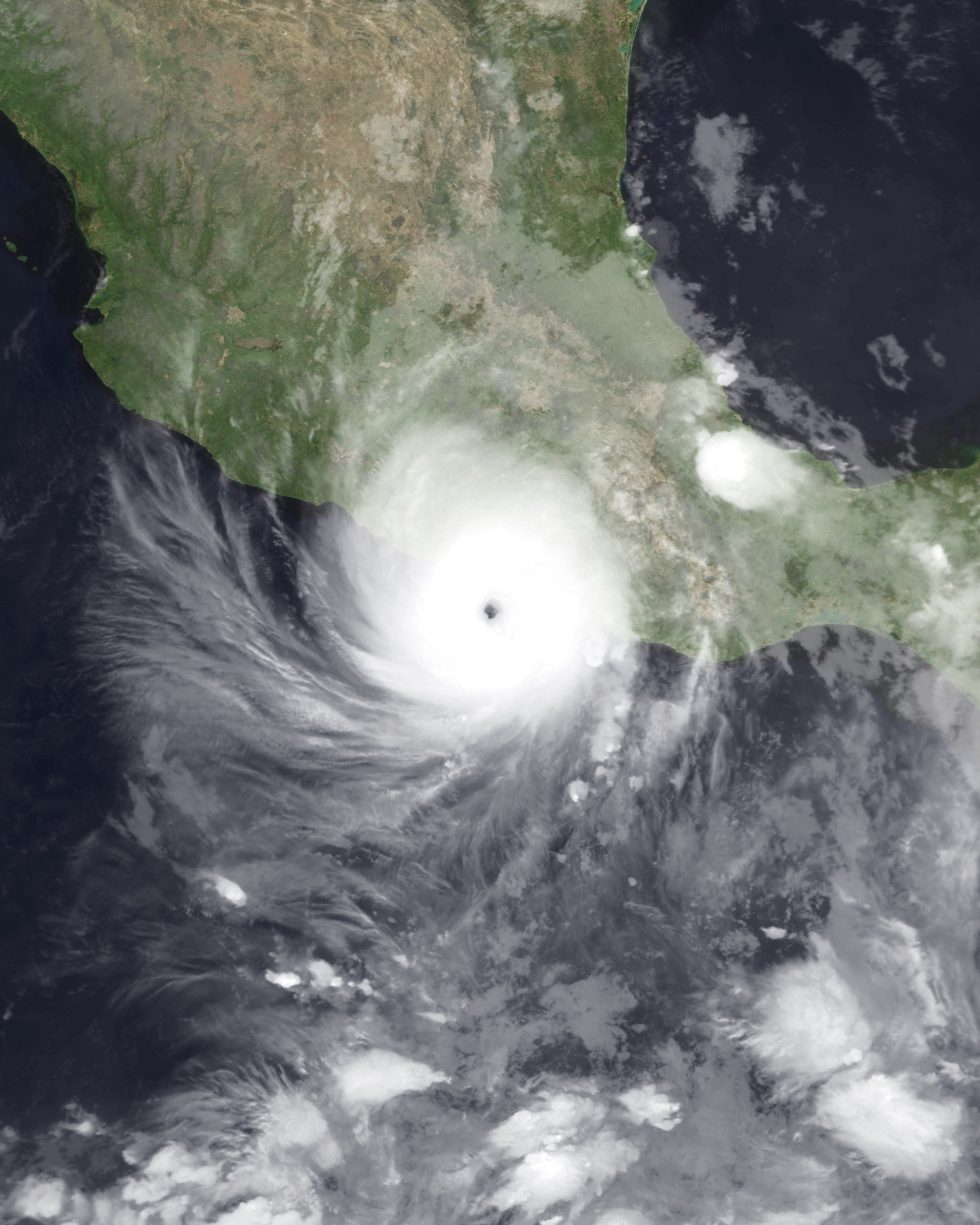
Hurricane Otis nearing landfall in Acapulco

The month of October was the warmest October ever recorded.

- October 4 – Monthly record highs were set in Burlington, Vermont, and Syracuse, New York, with temperatures of 86 °F (30 °C) and 89 °F (32 °C).
- October 4–5 – Heavy rains in Sikkim causes the South Lhonak Lake to outburst, killing at least 74 people in Sikkim and West Bengal.
- October 6 – Six people are killed from rain-induced mudslides in Sri Lanka.
- October 8 – Landslides in Yaoundé, Cameroon leaves 27 dead and left 50 injured.
- October 8 – Bush fires in Darling Downs, Australia kills two people.
- October 17–23 – Hurricane Norma kills three people in Sinaloa, Mexico.
- October 19–27 – Cyclone Lola becomes the earliest Category 5 cyclone in the South Pacific region and kills two in Vanuatu.
- October 22–25 – Hurricane Otis makes a devastating landfall near Acapulco, Mexico, as a Category 5, the strongest ever Pacific hurricane at landfall. At least 50 people are killed, with some estimates going up to 350, and $16 billion in damages are done.
- October 28 – November 6 – Tropical Storm Pilar leaves two dead in El Salvador.

=== November ===
- November 19 – Flooding in the Dominican Republic kills 21 people.
- November 20 – Flooding in Turkey and Bulgaria kills nine people and leaves eleven crew members on the Kafkametler missing.
- November 24-28 - A winter storm in the United States kills 4.
- November 27 – A snowstorm in Ukraine and Moldova kills eight people and injures another 29.

=== December ===
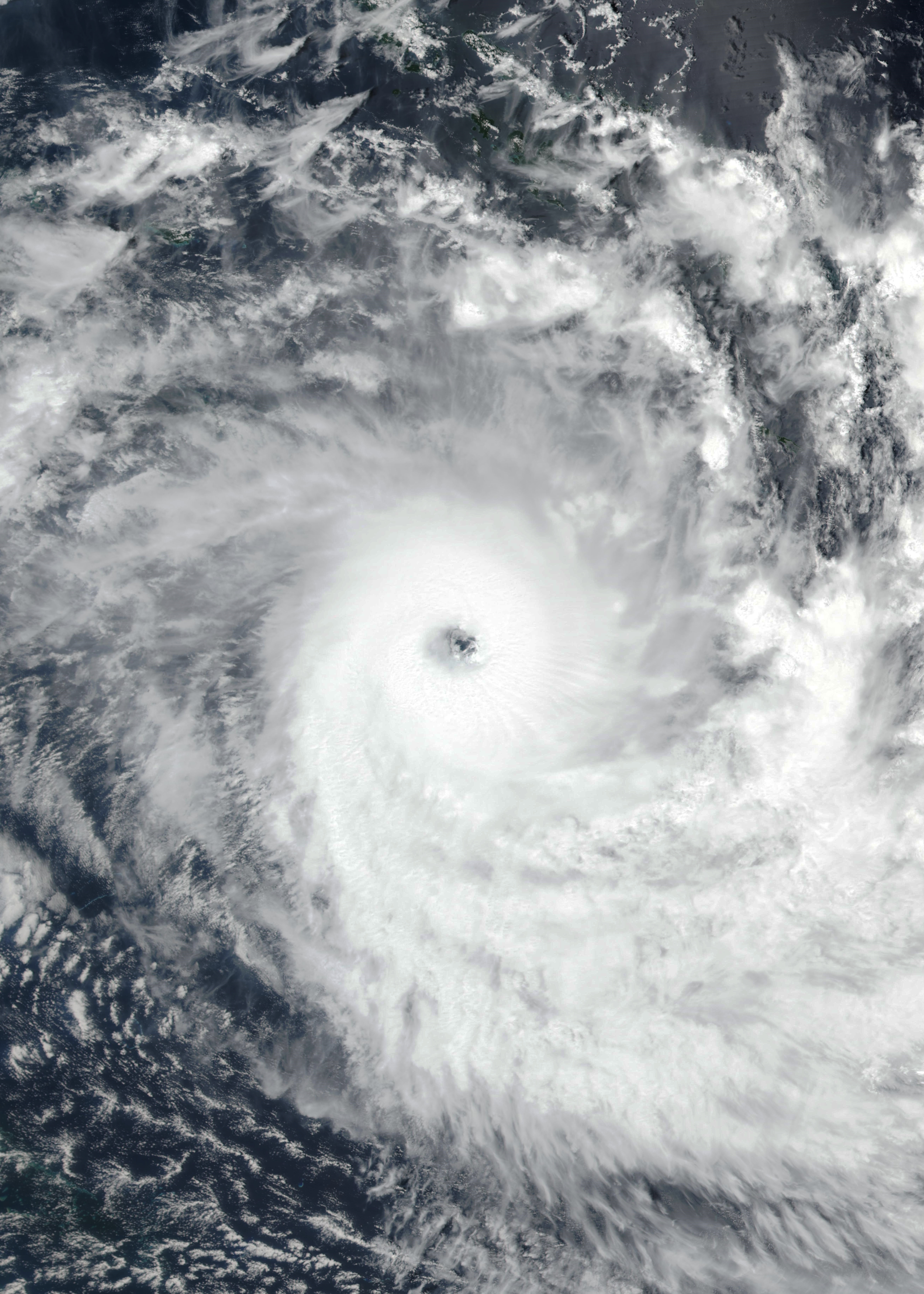
Cyclone Jasper on 8 December

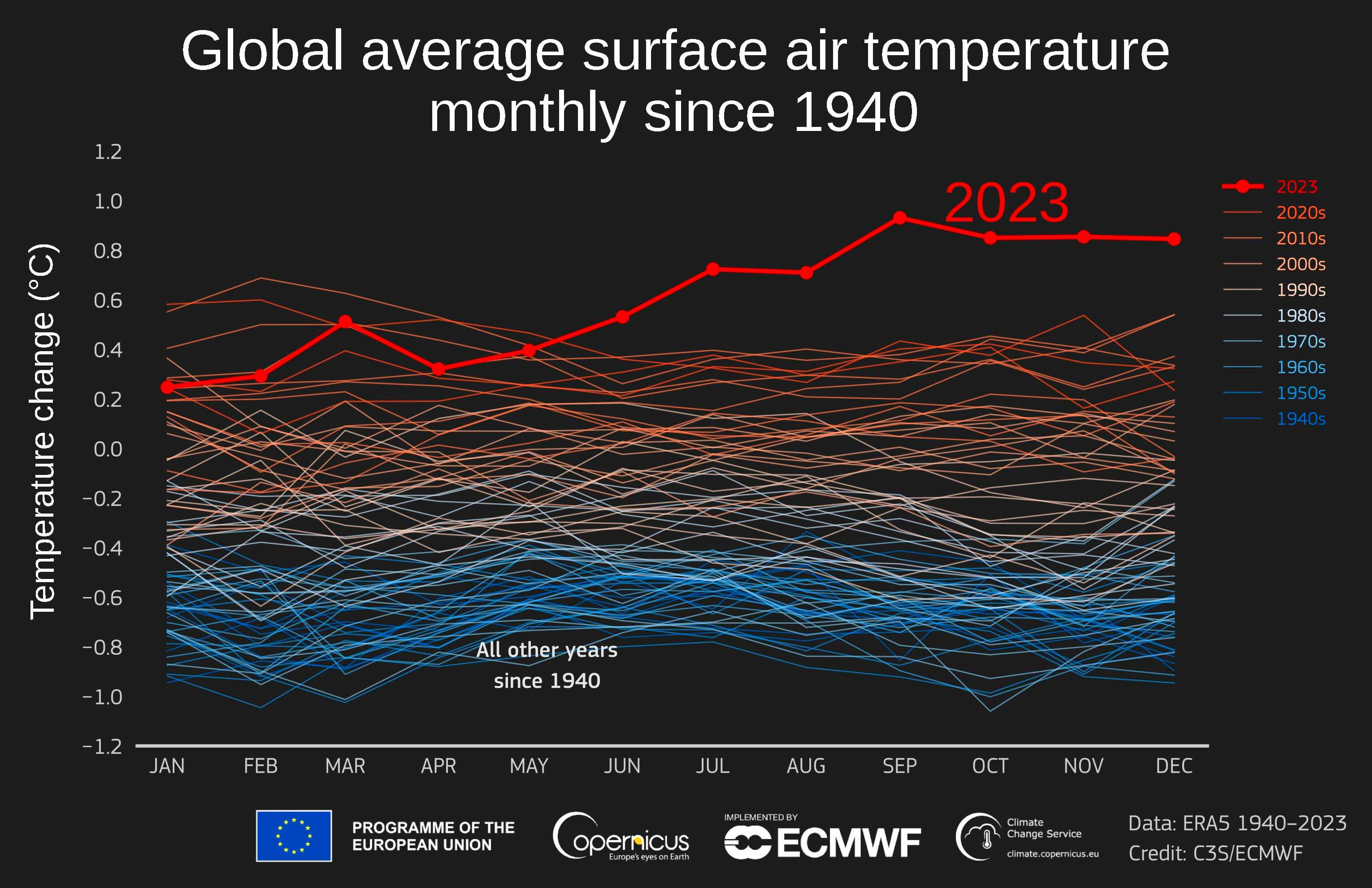
2023 saw the highest global average surface temperature in recorded history.

- December 2–18 – Cyclone Jasper becomes the wettest tropical cyclone in Australian history, with 2,252 mm (88.7 in) of rain falling in Northern Queensland.
- December 3 – Flooding and landslides in Tanzania kills 47 people and injures another 85.
- December 5 – An atmospheric river in the Pacific Northwest kills one person.
- December 9-10 - A tornado outbreak kills 6 people in Tennessee.
- December 14 – Over 500 people are injured in a subway collision in Beijing, partially due to slippery tracks in a winter storm.
- December 16 – A severe thunderstorm in Bahía Blanca, Argentina kills 13 people.
- December 18 – A storm in the Northeastern United States kills four people and causes over 600,000 power outages.
- December 26 – 22 people are killed in floods in the Kasaï-Central provence of the Democratic Republic of the Congo.
- December 27 – Thunderstorms in Eastern Australia kills 10 people.
- December 29 – 20 people are killed in landslides in the South Kivu region of the Democratic Republic of the Congo.
- December 30 - Flash flooding in KwaZulu-Natal, South Africa, kills 21.
- December 31 - Tropical Storm Alvaro forms west of Madagascar, bringing heavy rain and strong winds to the island, then persisting into 2024.

== Space weather ==
- January 9 – An X1.9-class solar flare causes a widespread radio blackout across South and Central America. The active region that produced the solar flare also produced an X1.2-class solar flare on January 5.
- December 14 – An X2.8-class solar flare, the largest since September 2017, causes an R2 radio blackout across South and Central America.
- December 31 – An X5.0-class solar flare causes an R3 radio blackout over the Pacific.

== Events in meteorology ==
- January 9 – Perseverance provides the first ever detailed weather report on Mars.

== See also ==
- Weather of 2022
- Weather of 2021

== Notes ==
Global weather by year
Preceded by 2022	Weather of 2023	Succeeded by 2024
