= 2023 Pakistan floods =

Floods in Pakistan

- Date: 17 March 2023 – 15 July 2023
- Location: Balochistan, Khyber Pakhtunkhwa and Punjab, Pakistan
- Cause: Heavy monsoon rains
- Deaths: 159
- Injuries: 264

The 2023 Pakistan floods occurred from March to July of 2023, caused by monsoon rains which returned to Pakistan after nine months after the 2022 Pakistan floods. Floods worsened at the end of June due to upcoming monsoon rains. At least 159 people were killed, including many children.

== Background ==
Many major floods have occurred in Pakistan. Flooding in 2020 killed 410 people and caused US$1.5 billion worth of damage, with 187 deaths occurring in Karachi in 2021 and 1,739 killed across the country in 2022.

== Impact ==
As of July, at least 159 people had been killed, including 96 who died in July alone. There were also 264 injuries, including 151 who were hurt in July. The floods affected 9 million people and destroyed 849,000 hectares of crops.

=== Balochistan ===
Flooding on 17 March killed ten people in Balochistan, including eight in Awaran District. On 30 April, flooding affected several houses, left four dead and four others injured. Flooding in July killed six in the province. In Pakistan, poor governance has exacerbated the issue of flooding, primarily impacting the provinces of Sindh and Balochistan. This calamity has claimed the lives of over 1,100 individuals and left 33 million others grappling with its devastating consequences. Additionally, nearly 750,000 people find themselves deprived of secure and suitable housing, access to education, and essential healthcare facilities.

=== Khyber Pakhtunkhwa ===
Flooding in Khyber Pakhtunkhwa Province killed 11 people from 24 March to 3 April, with 17 more deaths, including eight from a landslide, and nine injuries occurring in the rest of April.

From June 10 to 11, over 20 people were killed and 100 others were injured due to flooding, including 15 in Bannu District. At least 20 more deaths occurred the following month, including eight children who were killed by a landslide in Shangla District on July 6.

=== Punjab ===
On July 5, at least 19 deaths occurred in Lahore due to electrocution or collapsing roofs. Flooding from 6-9 July killed 52 others across Punjab.

== See also ==
- List of floods in Pakistan
- 2023 South Asian floods

== Sources ==
This article incorporates text from a free content work. Licensed under CC BY 4.0 (license statement/permission). Text taken from The Impact of Disasters on Agriculture and Food Security 2025, The Food and Agriculture Organization of the United Nations.
