= 2023 North India floods =

Disaster occurred in North India

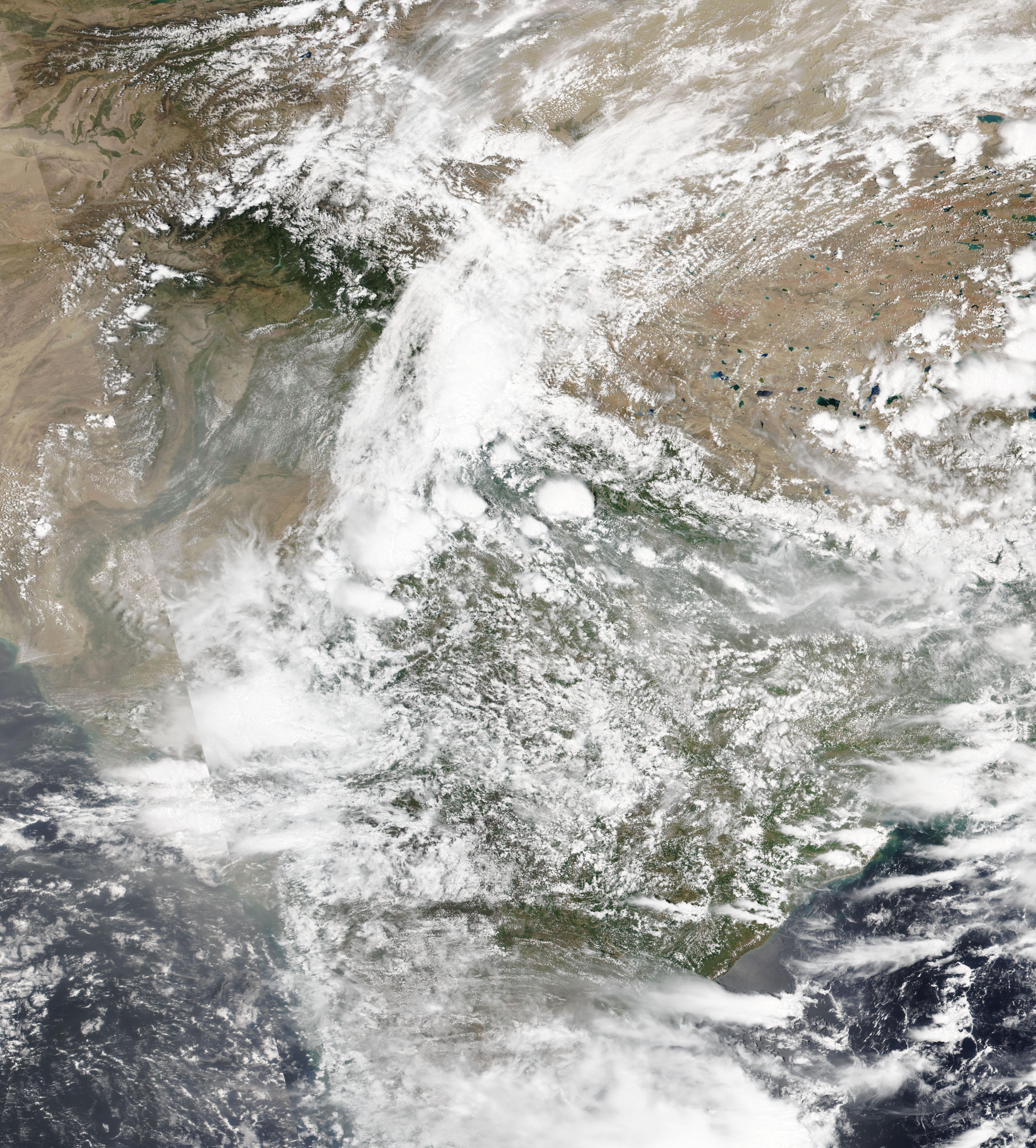
- Satellite image of North India on 10 July, showing various systems causing flooding
- Cause: Heavy rain Discharges; Landslide

Meteorological history
- Duration: 1 April 2023 – late 2023

Flood
- Max. rainfall: 30 cm (11.81 in)

Overall effects
- Fatalities: 422
- Injuries: ≥100
- Missing: 38
- Areas affected: North India

Heavy rainfall during the 2023 monsoon season resulted in severe flooding and landslides across Northern India, primarily affecting residents in Himachal Pradesh, Punjab, Chandigarh, Uttarakhand, Jammu and Kashmir, Haryana, Rajasthan and Delhi.

A monsoon surge, coupled with a western disturbance has led to the highest rainfall in decades in some parts of the region, causing nearby rivers to overflow, with flooding and landslides washing away vehicles, destroying bridges and roads, and disrupting power and electricity.

In July, at least 105 individuals across Himachal Pradesh, Uttar Pradesh, and Delhi, were killed over a two-week period of intense rain and flooding, with thousands of others evacuated to relief camps. The floods have led to closure of schools, disruption of flights and train operations in various parts of North India.

Another period of intense torrential rain continued in August, and at least 71 more people were killed in Himachal Pradesh, while 10 others died in Uttarakhand.

== Background ==
The South Asian monsoon season, which spans from June to September, typically brings about 80% of annual rainfall to the region.

In recent years, India has witnessed intensified weather patterns, with the monsoon season becoming more erratic and less dependable over time. This period of heavy rainfall occurred closely on the heels of an intense heatwave that also affected much of northern India. While various factors contribute to flooding, experts point to climate change as a significant driver of increased occurrences of heavy rainfall.

== Affected areas ==
The states of Haryana, Himachal Pradesh, Punjab, and Rajasthan experienced extensive waterlogging due to heavy rainfall.

=== Himachal Pradesh ===
The state of Himachal Pradesh was the hardest hit, with at least 330 dead, 38 missing and more than 100 injured during flooding since 1 April. More than 1,000 roads were blocked in the state as a result of downed power lines and other damaged infrastructure. Approximately 70,000 tourists were evacuated from the state, as reported by Chief Minister Sukhvinder Singh Sukhu. Rescue operations were led by teams from the Indian army and the National Disaster Response Force. Several districts experienced an entire month's worth of rainfall within a single day. In Manali, roads were swept away by the deluge, leaving both tourists and their vehicles stranded.

Over the weekend of the second week of August, additional torrential rains hit Shimla, triggering landslides and destroying a temple, homes, and buildings, and killing at least 57 people. The intensity of the rains was attributed to climate change. The landslides washed out several roads, including the Himalayan Expressway, and sections of the Kalka–Shimla Railway. The additional floods and landslides killed a total of 71 people. A massive landslide destroyed roads and buildings in the city of Shimla.

Cumulatively, since the monsoon hit on 24 June, 170 incidents of cloudburst or landsliding had been reported and 9,600 houses had been damaged in Himachal Pradesh. Chief minister Sukhvinder Singh Sukhu has stated that the losses from the combined floods of 2023 have been as high as 10,000 crore rupees, and the damaged infrastructure would take a year to repair.

=== Punjab ===
On 9 July 2023, a high alert was issued in different districts of Punjab due to incessant rains. There were a surfeit of waterlogged roads and many cars were submerged in water. The situation worsened in Patiala and Dera Bassi as fields were inundated. Many roads caved in, disrupting the traffic. The rains did not show any signs of abating as it had been profusely raining for the past three days. On 10 July 2023, an order was passed to close all schools, which reopened on 17 July.

=== Delhi ===
The capital city of Delhi saw over 153 millimetres (6.0 in) rain on 9 July 2023, marking the highest precipitation in a single day in July in over 40 years. Authorities took measures to relocate numerous individuals residing near Yamuna riverbanks to safer areas. In addition, residents in other susceptible regions were advised to make necessary arrangements for potential evacuations. The traffic flow across a critical bridge spanning the river was disrupted, and schools were closed. Flooding in the capital lead to at least one death.

The Yamuna river breached its all-time high-water mark, which had stood for over 45 years. The situation impacted prominent areas, including the street outside Chief Minister Arvind Kejriwal's residence and a major road towards Connaught Place, a renowned business center. Chief Minister Kejriwal urged the federal government to regulate the water release from the Hathnikund Barrage in Haryana, which contributed to the swelling of the Yamuna river. Flooding of the Yamuna river also resulted in water surrounding the Red Fort.

Sixteen thousand individuals were provided shelter in relief tents arranged by the Delhi government. The state's governor convened with the Delhi Disaster Management Authority to discuss the flood situation. Kejriwal mentioned that an advisory would be issued for private offices to encourage remote work. Due to the flood-like situation, three water treatment plants in Delhi were temporarily shut down. As a result, water was rationed. Furthermore, heavy vehicles, with the exception of those engaged in essential services, were prohibited from entering Delhi.

=== Kashmir ===
Due to damage to a national highway, the Amarnath Yatra pilgrimage was suspended. As a result, thousands of pilgrims were stranded in nearby areas. At least four people were killed in the state.

=== Haryana ===
For the first time in history, Haryana was put under a flood warning. Farmers are preparing to lose up to 30% of their rice yield.

=== Uttarakhand ===
Heavy rainfall in mid-August caused flooding which killed ten people in Uttarakhand, including a boy and his parents. A total of 75 people were killed throughout the state between April and August.

=== Uttar Pradesh ===
At least 12 people were killed in Uttar Pradesh during flooding in July.

== See also ==
- Floods in India
- 2013 North India floods
- 2023 South Asian floods
- 2023 Raigad landslide
