= 2023 Torkham landslide =

Landslide in Pakistan

- Duration: 18 April 2023
- Location: Torkham, Khyber District, Khyber Pakhtunkhwa, Pakistan
- Cause: Thunder and lightning storm
- Deaths: 7
- Missing: "dozens"

On 18 April 2023, a landslide occurred in Khyber district of Pakistan's Khyber Pakhtunkhwa province. The landslide occurred soon after a thunder and lightning storm and buried more than 20 trucks and resulted in at least seven fatalities (including two Afghan nationals). Dozens more were thought to be trapped under the rubble. The Torkham crossing, a crucial border crossing between Pakistan and Afghanistan, was shut down as a result of the event.

== Background ==
The flow of people and goods between Pakistan and Afghanistan is made easier by the Torkham crossing, which serves as a vital commerce route between the two nations. Another important route for transportation is the Karakoram Highway, which links Gilgit-Baltistan with Islamabad.

According to a statement from the Khyber Pakhtunkhwa Disaster Management Authority, a landslide on the main road leading to the Torkham border crossing between Pakistan and Afghanistan crushed 15 to 20 cargo cars at around 02:00. The incident has seriously hampered connectivity, trade, and transit between the two nations.

== Response ==
The rescue operation involved heavy machinery, including 12 ambulances, 3 recovery vehicles, 4 fire vehicles, and 3 heavy excavators.

== Reactions ==
Prime Minister Shehbaz Sharif expressed his condolences and directed officials to speed up the rescue work and restore the road for traffic as soon as possible.

== See also ==
- Weather of 2023
