= 2023 Western Cape floods =

Multiple floods in Western Cape province, South Africa in 2023

- Date: 24–25 September 2023
- Location: Western Cape, South Africa
- Deaths: 11 (at least)
- Property damage: $74.5 million (2023 USD)

The 2023 Western Cape floods were a devastating series of floods affecting the Western Cape province of South Africa as a result of heavy rainfall on 24–25 September 2023. The flooding resulted in at least 11 fatalities, the closure of over 200 roads, and over 80,000 people being left without electricity.

== Background ==
On 23 September 2023, the South African Weather Service issued a level 6 warning for parts of the Garden Route District Municipality. The alert warned of damaging wind and waves as well as severe thunderstorms in the area from 24 to 25 September.

Over the two-day period from 24 to 25 September, the town of Stellenbosch in the Cape Winelands District Municipality, and the city Cape Town received 193mm and 143mm of rain respectively.

== Impact ==
By Tuesday 26 September, at least 11 people had been killed in the floods. Eight of those people, including 4 children were electrocuted when floods damaged electricity connections in their informal settlements. The remaining three people were killed after being washed away by the flood waters. The number of people without electricity as a result of the flooding had reduced from over 80,000 people to approximately 15,000. As of 29 September, one person remains missing after being washed off a bridge while in his car in the town of Kleinmond.

=== Agriculture ===
In the immediate aftermath of the floods, the Western Cape Government estimated that damages to the agricultural sector in the province stood at R1.4 billion (US$74.5 million).

=== Events ===
The Rocking the Daisies music festival, initially scheduled for 6–8 October, was postponed to 17–19 November after the floods affected venue preparation.

The 32nd Hermanus Whale Festival was cancelled for health and safety reasons after water infrastructure in the area was damaged. Hermanus residents were supplied with water by tankers.

== See also ==
- Weather of 2023
