= 2023 South Asian floods =

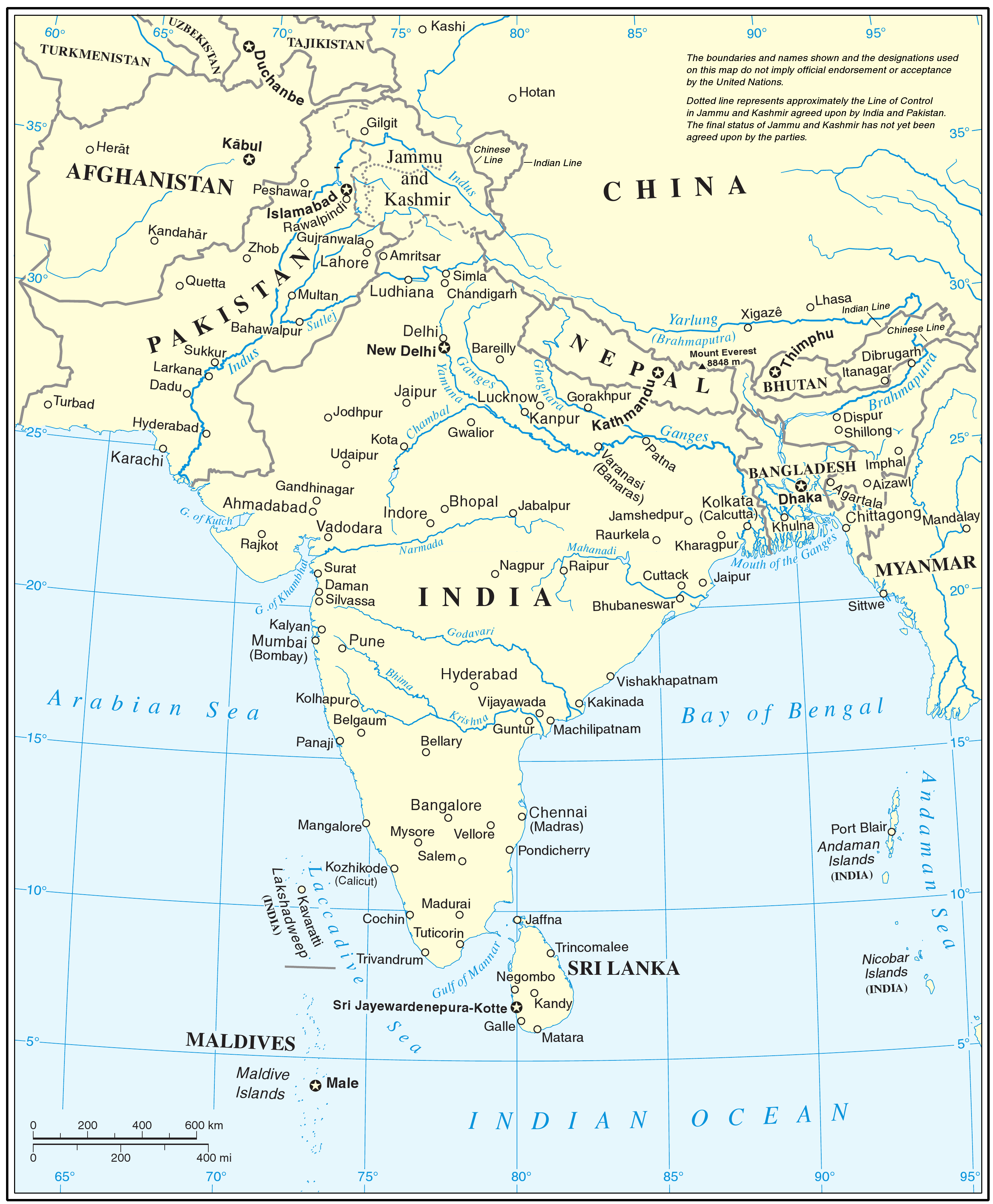
- UN map of South Asia
- Date: March - August 2023
- Location: Bangladesh, India, Nepal, Pakistan, Sri Lanka
- Cause: Heavy monsoon rains, tropical cyclones
- Deaths: 2,309
- Injuries: 1,890
- Missing: 135

Flooding affected parts of South Asia since March of 2023, killing many and destroying buildings.

== Background ==
Monsoons hit South Asia every year, mostly between June and September. Every year, floods affect the Indian subcontinent, collapsing buildings and causing landslides. Climate change in South Asia has exacerbated these storms.

== Countries affected ==
=== Bangladesh ===
Cyclone Mocha destroyed 2,522 houses and damaged 10,469 others in May. Three people died of indirect causes and 12 others were injured.

Flooding in August killed 57 people, left several missing, displaced around 45,000 residents and affected 1.2 million others, as well as damaging over 2,700 shelters. Damage estimated by the government in Bandarban District was Tk7 billion (US$63.9 million), though the locals estimated the loss to be over Tk10 billion (US$91.4 million).

=== India ===
In India, a total of 2,038 people were killed, 1,584 others were injured and 101 others were left missing due to flooding-related incidents between 1 April and 17 August. During this period, there were 518 deaths in Bihar, 330 more in Himachal Pradesh, 165 in Gujarat, 138 in Madhya Pradesh, 107 deaths each in Karnataka and Maharashtra, 90 more in Chhattisgarh and 75 in Uttarakhand.

Twelve people were killed and 23 others were injured in Rajasthan by Cyclone Biparjoy after it hit in June. At least 4,600 villages were affected by the storm.

Two people were killed by a landslide caused by flooding in Assam from 17 to 21 of June, which affected up to 100,000 residents in 20 districts.

Since 24 June, at least 229 people were killed and 38 others were left missing by flooding in northern India due to monsoon rains, including 105 in July and 81 more in August.

=== Nepal ===
Since June, at least 38 people died and 33 others were left missing after floods across Nepal, which damaged at least 283 homes.

=== Pakistan ===
From March to July of 2023, at least 159 people were killed and 264 others were injured by floods in Pakistan, including 68 deaths in Khyber Pakhtunkhwa, 52 in Punjab, and 20 in Balochistan.

=== Sri Lanka ===
Although the impact of Cyclone Mocha on Sri Lanka was significantly reduced by its landfall between Bangladesh and Myanmar, seven people were injured, another was reported missing, and nearly 2,000 people were affected in Southern Sri Lanka due to the cyclonic storm's indirect influence.

== See also ==
- Weather of 2023
- 2020 South Asian floods
- 2022 South Asian floods
