= 2024 Baños landslide =

2024 landslide in central Ecuador

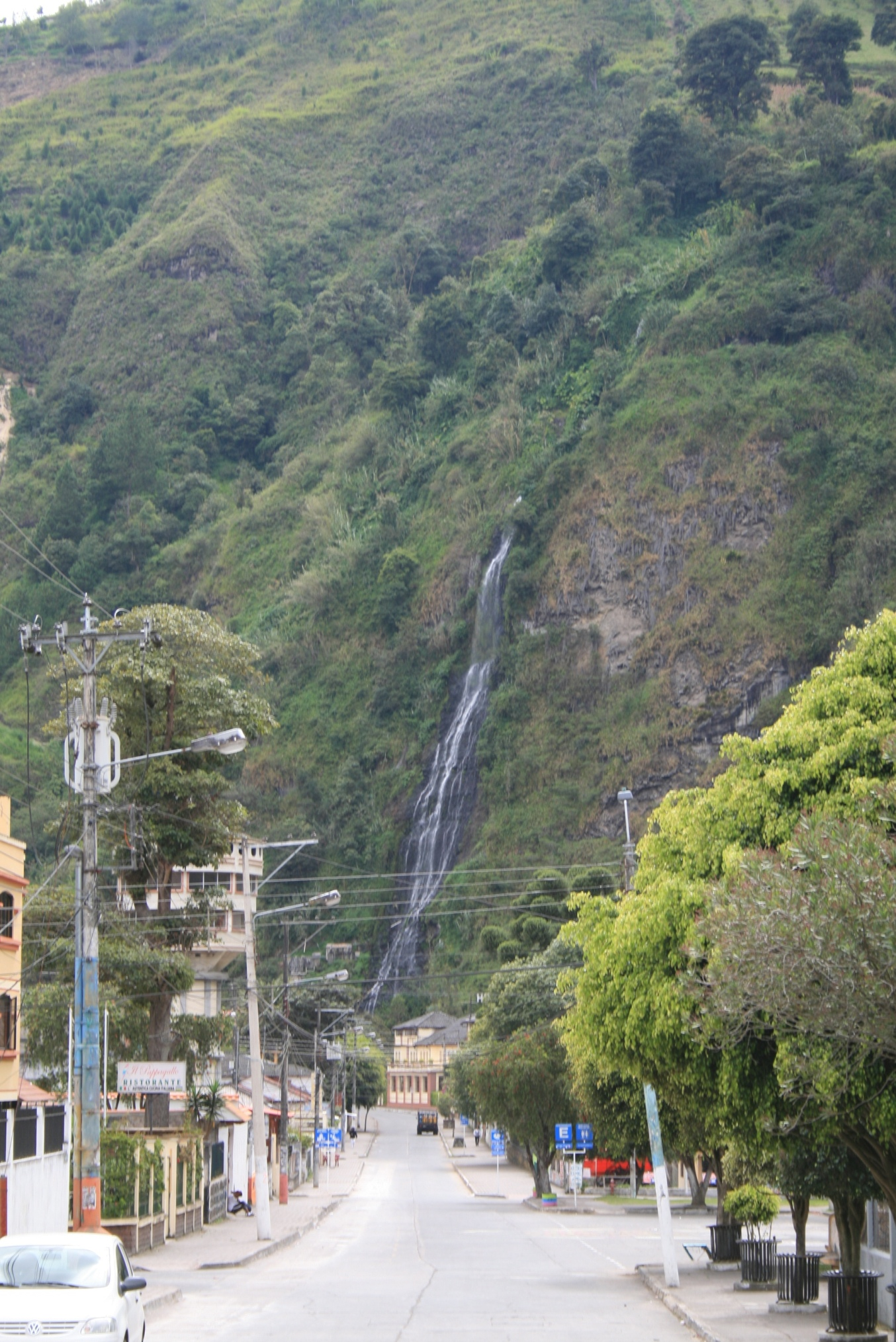
- A hillside in Baños de Agua Santa
- Date: June 16, 2024
- Location: Baños de Agua Santa, Tungurahua, Ecuador
- Cause: Heavy rainfall
- Deaths: 8
- Injuries: 22
- Missing: 11
- Property damage: Two houses, three cars, and one bus

On 16 June 2024, a landslide made out of mud and debris struck a highway in the resort city of Baños, Tungurahua in Ecuador following heavy rainfall, striking at least three cars, two houses and a bus, and killing at least eight people with over 11 people missing.

== Background ==
Baños de Agua Santa is the second most populous city in the province of Tungurahua, located in central Ecuador and on the northern foothills of the Tungurahua volcano. The city is a popular destination for tourism due to its surrounding mountainous geography allowing for hiking and rock climbing, the presence of rivers, waterfalls, and hot springs allowing for kayaking, canoeing, and rafting, and its proximity to the Llanganates National Park.

== Landslide ==
Heavy rainfall caused a "large-magnitude" landslide made out of saturated mud to move down a hill and strike a highway and at least three cars, two houses and a bus. At least eight bodies were recovered while 22 others and injured and 11 declared missing.

== See also ==
- 2023 Alausí landslide
- 2022 Ecuador landslides
- Nambija mine disaster
- List of landslides
