= 2022 Ecuador landslides =

Natural disasters in Ecuador

- Landslide (Ecuador)
- Date: 31 January-1 February 2022
- Location: Ecuador
- Type: Landslide, flash flood
- Participants: 550 (160 families)
- Deaths: 28
- Injuries: 52
- Missing: 9

From January 31 to February 1, 2022, heavy rainfall impacted Ecuador, which caused multiple landslides, floods, and mudflows. It was caused by the country's biggest rainfall in nearly 20 years, which fell on the capital.

== Background ==
Heavy rains, floods, and landslides have affected Ecuador, especially Guayas, Cotopaxi, El Oro, and Los Ríos, since the rains began on January 28, 2022. According to the local authorities of the city of Quito, the flooding occurred in the western part of the city after a brief period of rain of up to 75 mm in the afternoon of January 31, 2022. In Quito, there are 28 dead, 52 injured and 1 missing. The rain caused mudslides on Pichincha volcano overlooking the capital, damaging roads in the capital, washing away cars, destroying homes, and damaging infrastructure along the way.

According to videos on social media, local residents wept and screamed for help as a muddy river carrying trees, vehicles, garbage cans, and utility poles flowed through the streets of Quito. "The soil on the slopes was oversaturated, which led to slips from the slopes into the river course, and that led to this landslide," Guarderas said.

Monday's rainfall was a "record figure" not seen in the past since 2003. Quito Mayor Santiago Guaderas said. According to the mayor, it was the heaviest rainfall in the capital in nearly two decades. The storm that caused the landslide was as high as 75 liters per square meter (that means nearly 75 mm or nearly 3 inches of rain).

== Geographical Explanation and Impacts ==
Ecuador, the neighbour of Colombia and Peru, is in western South America. It has a population of approximately 18 million, many choosing urban living with 2 million living in Ecuador's capital, Quito. Inhabitants are attracted to the city's history, architecture, ease of transportation, employment opportunities, education, and medical facilities.

Quito has a temperate climate but is surrounded by the Andes Mountains which increases the vulnerability of the city, with the high mountains and deep valleys, the city is at a heightened risk of multiple natural threats, including landslides, volcano eruptions, floods, and earthquakes.

October to May is renowned for the rainy season however, 31 January 2022 – 1 February 2022 saw the heaviest rainfall in Ecuador since 2003, forty times more rain fell than expected. As a result, landslides triggered a heavy flow of water, mud, and rocks from the slopes of Pichincha Volcano, destroying recreation grounds, houses and sweeping vehicles away, causing significant dangers with missing people, injuries, and loss of life.

La Gasca and La Comuna, small neighbourhoods in Quito, were the worst affected. Although Ecuador is seen as a middle-income country these areas do not reflect that, with La Comuna's low socio-economic inhabitants still trying to recover from the impacts of COVID-19. The landslides resulted in structural damage, littering of debris, displacement of residents and both physical and psychological harm with an increased risk of further poverty.

The main cause of the floods and landslide is thought to be linked with the growing impacts of climate change, with a rise in irregular weather patterns such as El Niño and La Niña. Surrounding South American countries were also exposed to the adverse weather conditions, with Brazil witnessing similar scenes, resulting in 24 deaths.

== Immediate mortality and morbidity implications ==
The number of casualties has been increasing in the Lagasca region (near Quito) following landslides triggered by heavy rains and. According to the authorities, 23 people have died, 15 people are reported missing and 49 others have been injured. In addition, several buildings and roads in parts of Quito have been hit by widespread flooding. Local and national authorities were also active at the time in providing relief assistance to the area. moderate to heavy rains are expected to continue in most of west-central Ecuador, including the Quito area, from 2 to 3 February (ECHO, 2 Feb 2022)

Until 7 February 2022, floods and landslides triggered by heavy rainfall have caused a total of injuries and casualties in the past week in the Quito area. According to media reports, 28 people have died, one person is missing and 52 people have been injured.(ECHO, 7 Feb 2022)

Since the rains began on 28 January 2022, the effects of heavy rainfall, flooding and landslides have spread to most areas of Ecuador, particularly Guayas, Cotopaxi, El Oro and Los Rios. According to the local authorities in Quito, flooding occurred in the western part of the city after powerful precipitation of up to 75 millimetres. The rain on the afternoon of 31 January 2022 was the highest intensity of rainfall since 2003. The rainfall triggered mud and rock flows that descended rapidly down the slopes of the Pichincha volcano, creating a devastating impact on the roads. The area's infrastructure was close to destruction as the mudslides crossed the roads, destroying buildings and washing away cars and all matters of the ground. According to statistics the damage caused by the floods and the landslides triggered affected 550 people (160 families) in Quito, killing 28 people, injuring 52 and leaving one person missing. (IFRC, 10 Feb 2022)

As of March 11, 2022, heavy rains have been affecting several provinces in Ecuador, causing flooding, triggering landslides, and leading to evacuations and destruction. The provinces most affected are Azuay, Chimborazo, Cotopaxi, El Oro, Esmeraldas, Guayas, Los Ríos and Pichincha. In Cotopaxi province, eight bridges were damaged or destroyed and at least 15,000 people were quarantined. In addition, more than 50 people were affected and 33 houses were damaged in the provinces of El Oro, Loya and Pichincha.(ECHO, 11 Mar 2022)

The number of casualties and reported damage on the road between the city of Cuenca and the town of Molleturo increased after a huge landslide in the Sayausi region (Cuenca state, Azuay province, southern Ecuador) on March 27. The National Risk and Emergency Management Service (SNGRE) reports that as of March 29, four people were killed, 10 injured, 14 evacuated families, nine homes destroyed and 27 damaged as a result of the landslide. During the next 24 hours, rainfall is expected to increase, especially in the southern provinces, with locally heavy rainfall. The number of casualties and reported damages increased after a 5.8M earthquake with a depth of 26 km struck Esmeraldas province (northern Ecuador) at 4:28 UTC on March 27.(ECHO, 29 Mar 2022)

== Response and relief efforts ==
A variety of local and national authorities provided emergency support to the affected population. Search and rescue operations, containment actions, psychological care, and the transfer of injured people to hospitals went on for days after the landslides appeared. The most relevant actors involved in the immediate emergency responses were:

- City of Quito: Communication and set-up of shelters to support displaced families.
- Quito Municipal Fire Department: Search and recovery.
- Local Ambulance and Police: Search and recovery.
- Integrated Security Service ECU 911 (SIS ECU 911): Communication.
- Armed Forces of Ecuador (FFAA): Flood search and rescue.
- National Risk and Emergency Management Service (SNGRE): Confirmation of deaths, injured, and missing.
- Government of Ecuador and Guillermo Lasso: Coordination and communication.

On 4 February 2022, the Metropolitan Council of Quito declared a state of emergency for the Metropolitan District of Quito. On 9 February 2022, the International Federation of Red Cross (IFRC) implemented a 3-month Emergency Action Plan for all areas of Ecuador affected by the heavy rainfalls and its consequences, including Quito. On 4 May 2022, the plan was extended to the timeframe of 6 months.

As a longer-term response, the International Rescue Committee is closely working with Ecuador's authorities to support Venezuelan and Ecuadorian families who lost their homes or whose relatives were affected. According to the IRC, the disaster disproportionally affected Venezuelan families that have resettled in La Gasca over the last years. The IRC is providing cash assistance for families to cover basic needs as well as economic support to Chamos, a local non-governmental organisation that provides free health care and education to Venezuelan communities.

== What lessons emerged from the disaster? ==
=== Focus on the mental health of the affected population ===
From 1 February to 8 April 2022, 1,036 people who affected by the disaster were identified as having received medical interventions, of which 679 received psychological care. On the first day of the emergency, 32 psychological care sessions were provided to the families of the deceased in the vicinity of legal medicine. Since 5 February, psychiatrists have been providing care to patients with priority needs in the area of mental health, with a total of 38 services provided by the psychiatric team. The relief work was carried out with good care for the mental health of the affected population.

=== Strengthening urban infrastructure ===
Heavy rains caused a catchment structure to overflow, sending a deadly stream down a nearby hillside onto a sports field, where spectators and people practising volleyball on the court were victimised.

It took 84 hours of non-stop work for Agua de Quito to restore the structure of the El Tejado creek basin. In the aftermath of the disaster, during an evaluation meeting led by the Minister of Safety, it was established that Agua de Quito would work three shifts a day, 24 hours a day, seven days a week, to remove the material that had accumulated in the reservoir from the catchment structures of El Tejado creek and to prevent the possibility of a subsequent disaster.

=== Focus on regional development balance issues ===
The people, buildings and roads of Quito are compact and dense, the city is crowded, the slopes are highest on the western side against the mountains and for those refugees with low or no income, they had to build their houses in areas close to those marginal areas. The worst affected areas are the poorer communities, where most of the dead and disappeared were poor people who, for lack of a better place to live, built houses in the protected areas at the foot of the mountains. These areas were more vulnerable to erosion and suffered the most damage. The geographical constraints of cities certainly seem to be one of the causes of wealth inequality.

This is why it is more important to pay attention to the issue of balanced regional development and to the living conditions of more disadvantaged groups in the process of urban construction and development.

== See also ==
- 2024 Baños landslide
- 2023 Alausí landslide
- Weather of 2022
