= 2023 Afghanistan cold snap =

Deadly cold weather in Afghanistan

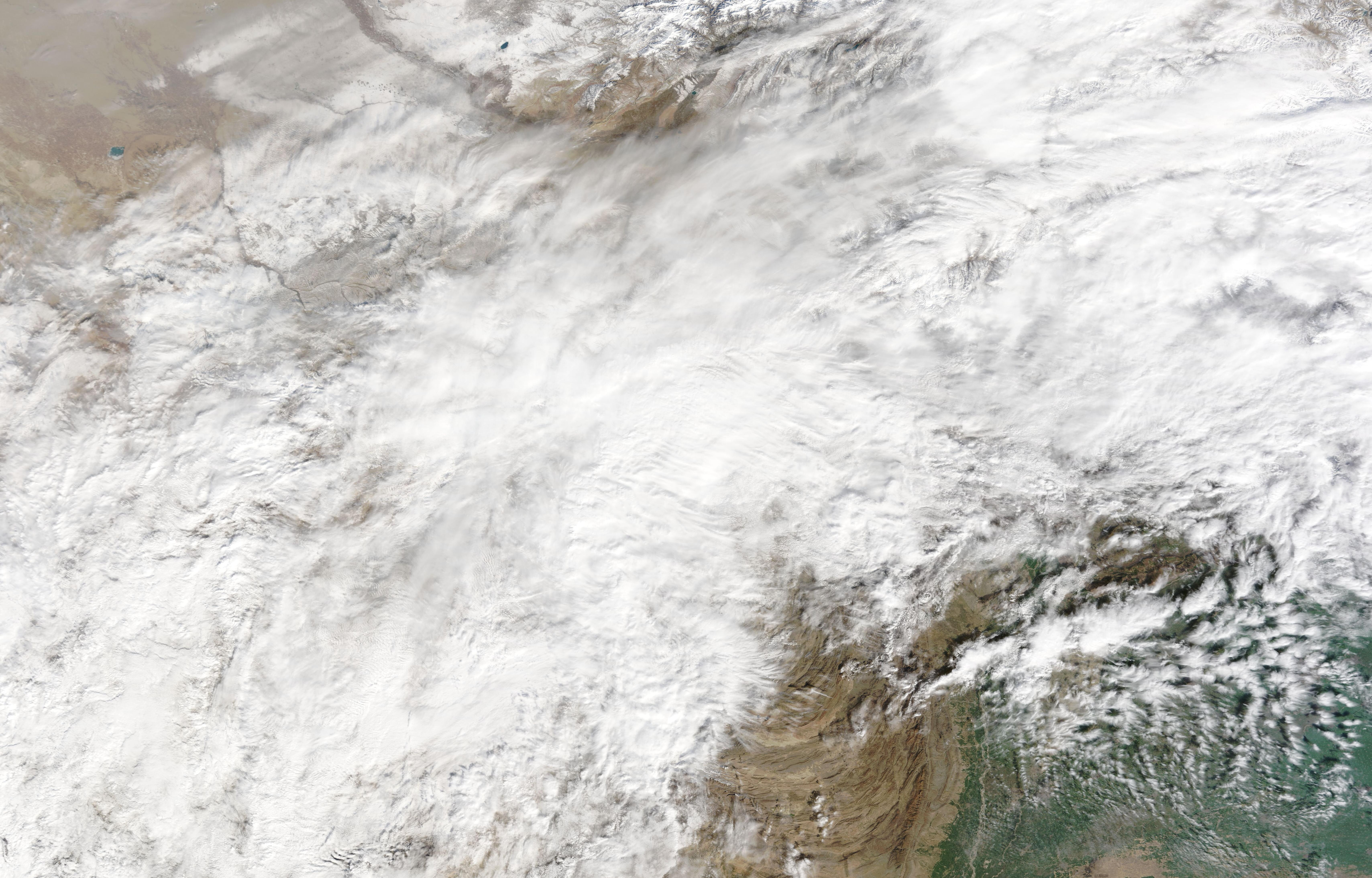
- Satellite imagery of Afghanistan on January 28

Meteorological history
- Formed: January 10, 2023
- Dissipated: January 17, 2023

Cold snap
- Lowest temperature: −33 °C (−27 °F)
- Maximum snowfall or ice accretion: 30 centimetres (12 in)

Overall effects
- Fatalities: 166 people, 80,000+ livestock
- Areas affected: Afghanistan

A cold snap began in Afghanistan on January 10, 2023. Temperatures reached as low as −33 °C (−27 °F) and snowfall was as high as 30 centimetres (12 in) in more mountainous regions. The cold snap killed at least 160 people, making it the deadliest weather event of 2023 until Cyclone Freddy. Additionally, nearly 80,000 livestock were killed.

== Impact ==
Temperatures fell to a low of −33 °C (−27 °F), with up to 30 centimetres (12 in) of snow in the higher mountain altitudes, directly or indirectly killing at least 162 people in various provinces. At least 140 people using gas for heating were hospitalized for carbon monoxide poisoning in Herat Province. Over 77,000 livestock died due to the weather. Over 50 houses were damaged across the country.

== Relief ==
The cold came while Afghanistan was experiencing a famine that affected more than half of the Afghan population. The country had become a pariah state following the 2021 Taliban offensive and the reestablishment of the Islamic Emirate of Afghanistan, leading to limited foreign aid.

Humanitarian relief efforts provided aid that included heating and relief funds. Foreign relief efforts were complicated by a ban on women providing humanitarian aid. These restrictions were relaxed for health-related aid on January 17, so non-governmental organizations such as the International Rescue Committee, Save the Children, and Care International resumed operations. Supreme leader Hibatullah Akhundzada stated that the restrictions would not be repealed.

Military helicopters were used to provide relief for citizens cut off by snow, but they were unable to access Afghanistan's mountainous regions.

== See also ==
- Weather of 2023
