= 2023 Alausí landslide =

Landslide in 2023

- Date: March 26, 2023
- Location: Alausí, Chimborazo Province, Ecuador
- Cause: Heavy rainfall
- Deaths: 11 deaths, 23 injured, 67 missing
- Property damage: 163 affected

On March 26 2023, a landslide was caused by the heavy rainfall in Alausí, Ecuador. At least 11 people were killed, 23 were injured, and 67 were missing.

== Impact ==
Prior to the landslide, tremors were heard, causing a landslide. The landslide was caused by months of heavy rainfall in the area, leading to tonnes of mud sliding down a hillside in Chimborazo Province, where 163 buildings and more than 500 people were affected. The landslide was estimated to be 150 metres (490 ft) wide and nearly half a mile long (700 meters). A portion of the Pan-American Highway was destroyed. 30 people were rescued after the landslide occurred, according to Ecuador's Risk Management Secretariat.

== Aftermath ==
An evacuation order was placed due to the imminent risk of renewed landslides, but was lifted several hours later.

Ivan Vinueza, governor of the Chimborazo Province, stated that some of the injured were taken to local area hospitals. 60 percent of the potable water service was affected. The Armed Forces of Ecuador, National Police of Ecuador, the Red Cross, and firefighters from other local areas, were deployed to assist the area affected by the landslide. The communications office of the Ecuador Presidential office stated that some schools would be switching to online classes.

== See also ==
- 2024 Baños landslide
- 2023 Serasan landslide
- 2022 Ecuador landslides
- Weather in 2023
- Climate of Ecuador
