= 2023 Raigad landslide =

2023 landslide in India

- Date: 19 July 2023; 3 years ago
- Location: Raigad district, Maharashtra, India
- Deaths: 26 (reported as of 22 July 2023, 16:00 IST)
- Missing: 109

On 19 July 2023 at approximately 22:30 local time, a landslide occurred in Raigad, Maharashtra, India. The landslide was caused by torrential rains, and resulted in at least 26 deaths, with more than 100 estimated trapped under debris.

== Preceding days ==
In the days leading up to the landslide, India experienced significant rains, with the Yamuna river at its highest level in 45 years. The region where the landslide occurred had been under an "orange" alert over the two days before the event.

== Landslide ==
The landslide occurred 9:30 on 19 July 2023, in the remote mountain hamlet of Irshalwadi, approximately 60 kilometres (37 mi) from Mumbai, the capital of Maharashtra. The village resides close to Irshalgad fort, which is a popular weekend trekking spot. The majority of the villagers are from the Thakur Adivasi community and have been residing in this region for many generations. Over 98 people were rescued, and 26 bodies had been recovered. Nine members of a family died. Maharashtra's deputy chief minister, Devendra Fadnavis, told the state assembly that an estimated 225 people lived in the hamlet.

Debris was, in some places, 10–29 feet (3.0–8.8 m) deep. At least 109 people were left missing under the debris. Seventeen out of 50 houses in the hamlet were damaged.

== Response ==
The National Disaster Response Force, police and medical teams were involved in relief efforts, which resumed on the morning of 21 July 2023 after being halted on late 20 July 2023 due to heavy rainfall. Excavators were airlifted to the site, and rescuers had to travel 1.5 miles (2.4 km) from the nearest highway to reach the site.

Eknath Shinde, the chief minister of Maharashtra, announced 500,000 Indian rupees in compensation for the families of the deceased.

== See also ==
- Weather of 2023
