= 2022–2023 Philippine floods =

Flood disaster in the Philippines

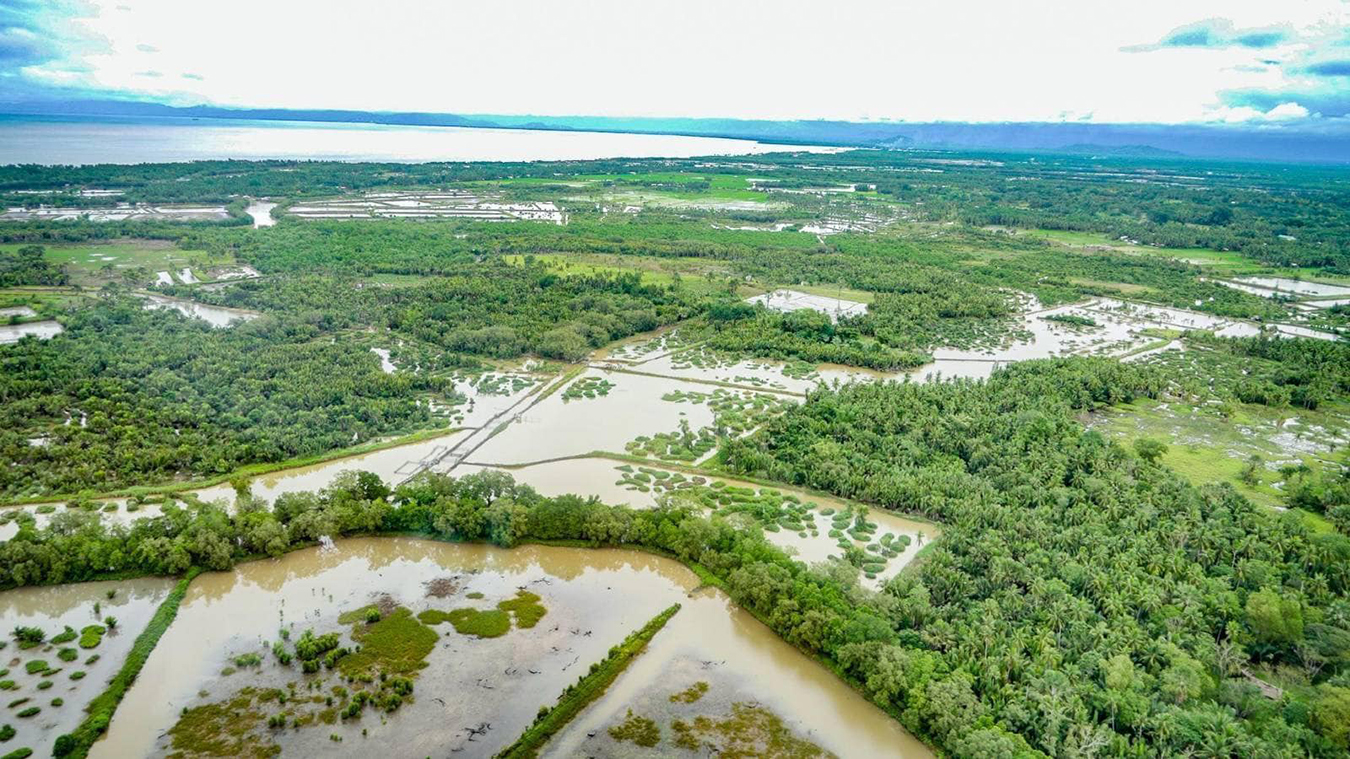
- Flooding in Misamis Oriental, January 2023
- Date: December 18, 2022 – February 5, 2023 (Note: Date of release of last report (No. 37) for "Combined Effects of Low Pressure Areas, Northeast Monsoon, and Shearline (2023)" by the National Disaster Risk Reduction and Management Council.)
- Location: Bicol, Mimaropa, Visayas, Mindanao
- Cause: Low-pressure areas, northeast monsoon, and shear line
- Deaths: 97 (Note: Figures from combined situation report series from the National Disaster Risk Reduction and Management Council (NDRRMC): December 18–30, 2022: Deaths: 52; Missing: 18; Injured:18; January 2–February 5, 2023: Deaths: 45; Missing: 7; Injured:11; The NDRRMC released a new situation report series on January 12, 2023 which counts casualties from January 2, 2023. The agency keeps a separate record for casualties for shear line system which affected the country mostly in December 2022.)
- Injuries: 29
- Missing: 25

In December 2022, a series of floods began to severely affect the provinces of Misamis Occidental and Misamis Oriental, and some parts of the southern island of Mindanao in the Philippines. The floods were caused by intense rain, which poured down on the central and southern parts of the country.

== Cause ==
The Philippine Atmospheric Geophysical and Astronomical Services Administration (PAGASA) said in a statement that the widespread rains were triggered by the shear line collision located within the regions of Visayas and Mindanao. The shear line then persisted towards the Eastern Visayas and CARAGA regions in the central and northern parts of the country. Low pressure areas and northeast monsoon also contributed.

== Impact ==
The provincial government of Misamis Occidental declared a state of calamity (SOC) as they received the full brunt of the flooding. The city of Ozamiz, the provincial capital of Oroquieta, the surrounding municipalities, as well as the city of Gingoog in Misamis Oriental were most affected by the floods. Samar, Northern Samar and Eastern Samar also declared SOC.
