= Cyclone Biparjoy =

North Indian Ocean Cyclone in 2023

Extremely Severe Cyclonic Storm Biparjoy
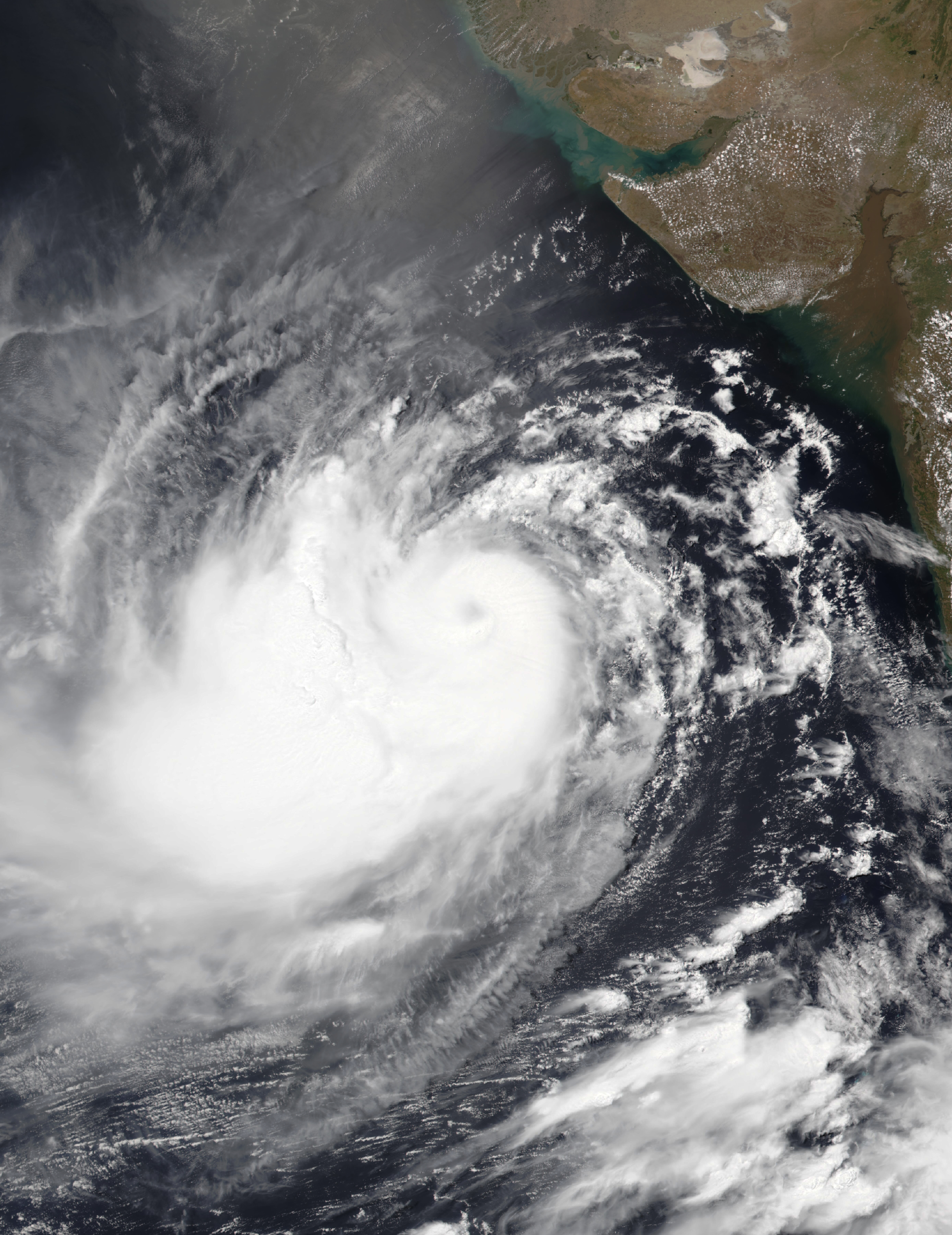
- Cyclone Biparjoy at peak intensity on 10 June

Meteorological history
- Formed: 6 June 2023
- Dissipated: 19 June 2023

Extremely severe cyclonic storm
- 3-minute sustained (IMD)
- Highest winds: 165 km/h (105 mph)
- Lowest pressure: 958 hPa (mbar); 28.29 inHg

Category 3-equivalent tropical cyclone
- 1-minute sustained (SSHWS/JTWC)
- Highest winds: 205 km/h (125 mph)
- Lowest pressure: 944 hPa (mbar); 27.88 inHg

Overall effects
- Fatalities: 17 total
- Injuries: 24
- Damage: $148 million (2023 USD)
- Areas affected: India, Pakistan
- IBTrACS
- Part of the 2023 North Indian Ocean cyclone season

Extremely Severe Cyclonic Storm Biparjoy (Note: The name Biparjoy (Bengali: বিপর্যয়; [bipɔɾdʒɔj]) was contributed by Bangladesh and means "disaster, calamity" in Bengali.) was a powerful and erratic tropical cyclone that formed over the east-central Arabian Sea. The third depression and the second cyclonic storm of the 2023 North Indian Ocean cyclone season, Biparjoy originated from a depression that was first noted by the India Meteorological Department (IMD) on 6 June, before intensifying into a cyclonic storm. The cyclone steadily weakened due to deep flaring convection. Biparjoy accelerated northeastward, strengthening to a Category 3-equivalent tropical cyclone and an extremely severe cyclonic storm. The cyclone made landfall in Naliya, India on June 16. Biparjoy was downgraded to a depression, and further into a well-marked low-pressure area late on June 19.

On June 12, the IMD issued alerts to local authorities in Gujarat, encouraging them to prepare for possible evacuations. Residents in coastal areas were warned to stay indoors as the storm approached. Gujarat's government responded by dispatching national and state disaster response teams to the affected areas. More than 1,50,000 people were evacuated. At least 23 people were injured as well as 4,600 villages were affected by power outages in India. A total of 12 people were confirmed to have been killed in India.

== Meteorological history ==
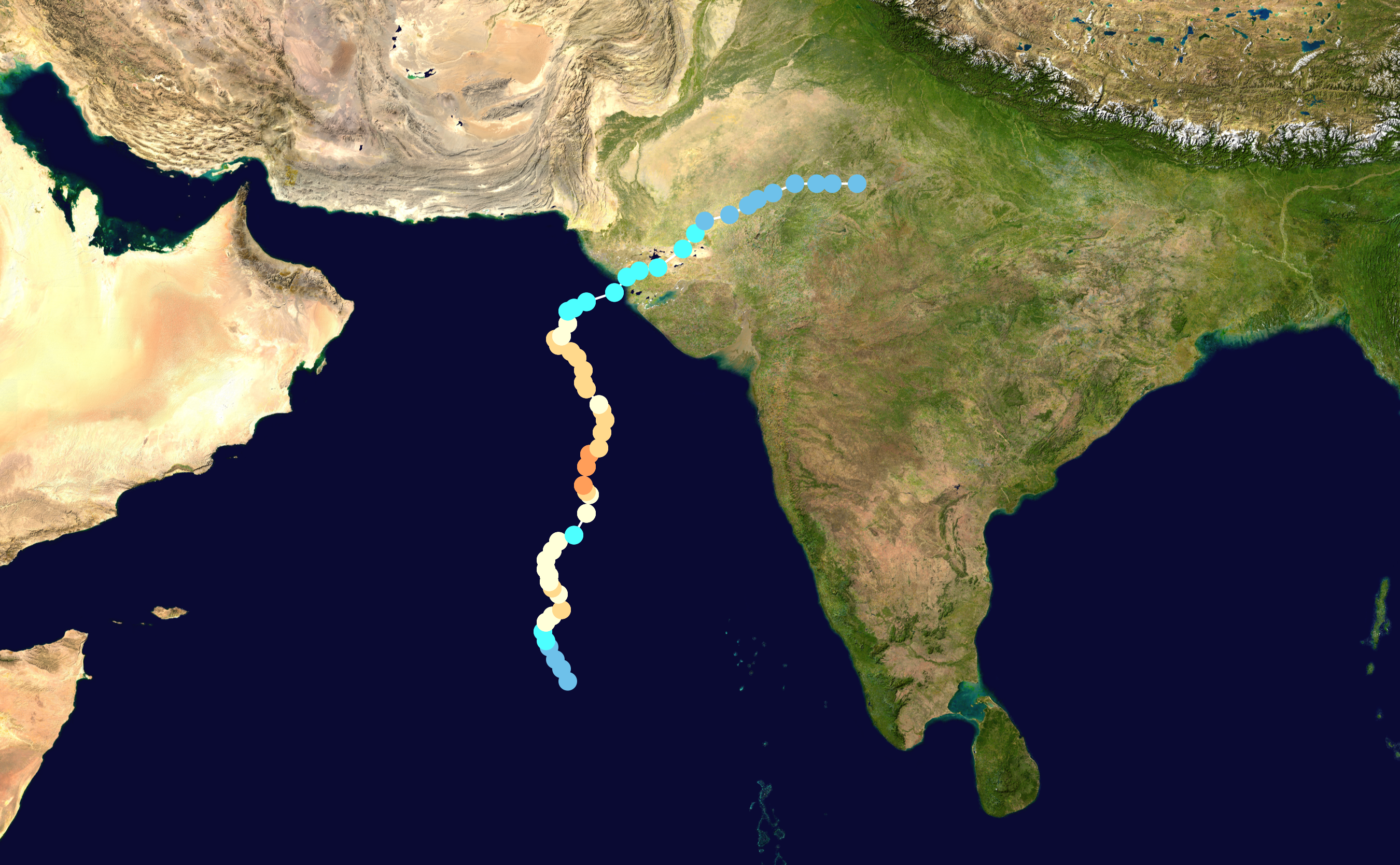
Map plotting the storm's track and intensity, according to the Saffir–Simpson scale Map key Saffir–Simpson scale Tropical depression (≤38 mph, ≤62 km/h) Tropical storm (39–73 mph, 63–118 km/h) Category 1 (74–95 mph, 119–153 km/h) Category 2 (96–110 mph, 154–177 km/h) Category 3 (111–129 mph, 178–208 km/h) Category 4 (130–156 mph, 209–251 km/h) Category 5 (≥157 mph, ≥252 km/h) Unknown Storm type Tropical cyclone Subtropical cyclone Extratropical cyclone, remnant low, tropical disturbance, or monsoon depression

On 1 June, the India Meteorological Department (IMD) began monitoring the potential for a formation of a cyclonic circulation in the Arabian Sea. A cyclonic circulation formed over the Arabian Sea on June 5. On the same day, a low-pressure area formed as a result of the cyclonic circulation. The following day, it significantly intensified into a depression. The Joint Typhoon Warning Center (JTWC) issued a Tropical Cyclone Formation Alert on the system as a result, marking it as Invest 92A. The IMD upgraded the depression to a deep depression, and subsequently to a cyclonic storm, assigning it the name Biparjoy. The JTWC subsequently initiated advisories on the system and classified it as Tropical Cyclone 02A. Six hours later as its convection evolved into a central dense overcast (CDO) with a nascent eye, Biparjoy steadily strengthened, gaining Category 1-equivalent winds of 130 km/h (80 mph).

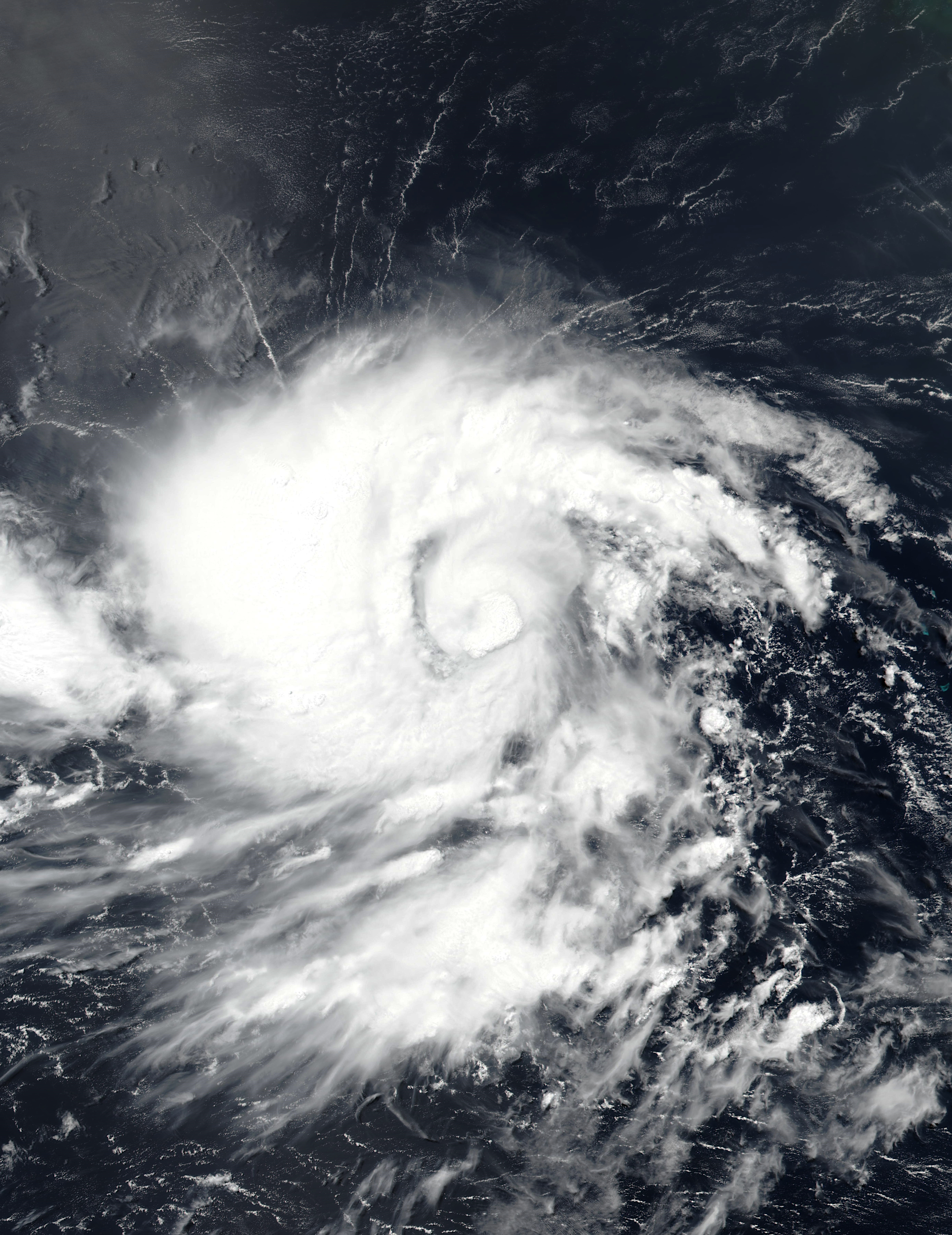
Cyclonic Storm Biparjoy on 6 June

By 00:00 UTC on 7 June, the IMD upgraded the system to a severe cyclonic storm with 3-minute sustained winds of 100 km/h (65 mph). Biparjoy cloud tops warmed and the convective burst collapsed, resulting in an upper-level outflow from the storm and pushing it back towards its system core. Biparjoy was upgraded to a very severe cyclonic storm at 06:00 UTC, at which point the system became a Category 2-equivalent tropical cyclone on the Saffir–Simpson hurricane wind scale (SSHWS). The cyclone was sheared due to moderate easterly vertical wind shear, with the deep convection displaced from the low-level circulation center. The cyclone steadily weakened due to deep flaring convection. Biparjoy unexpectedly rapidly intensified and became a Category 3-equivalent cyclone on 11 June.

Biparjoy reached its peak intensity as an extremely severe cyclonic storm, with maximum 3-minute sustained winds of 165 km/h (105 mph). The shear decreased and convective organization and areal extent increased. Banding features became increasingly evident in satellite images along the southern periphery. Biparjoy gradually weakened with convective banding over the northern semicircle. The structure of the cyclone quickly deteriorated as convection became asymmetric. Biparjoy made landfall on June 16 near Naliya, India, with sustained winds of 95 km/h (60 mph). Shortly after the landfall, the JTWC discontinued warnings on the system. The cyclone weakened into a depression. The depression was later marked as a well-marked low-pressure area by the IMD on June 19, prompting the discontinuation of advisories on the system.

Biparjoy broke the record for the highest accumulated cyclone energy of any North Indian Ocean cyclone, passing Cyclone Kyarr's 2019 mark.

== Preparations ==
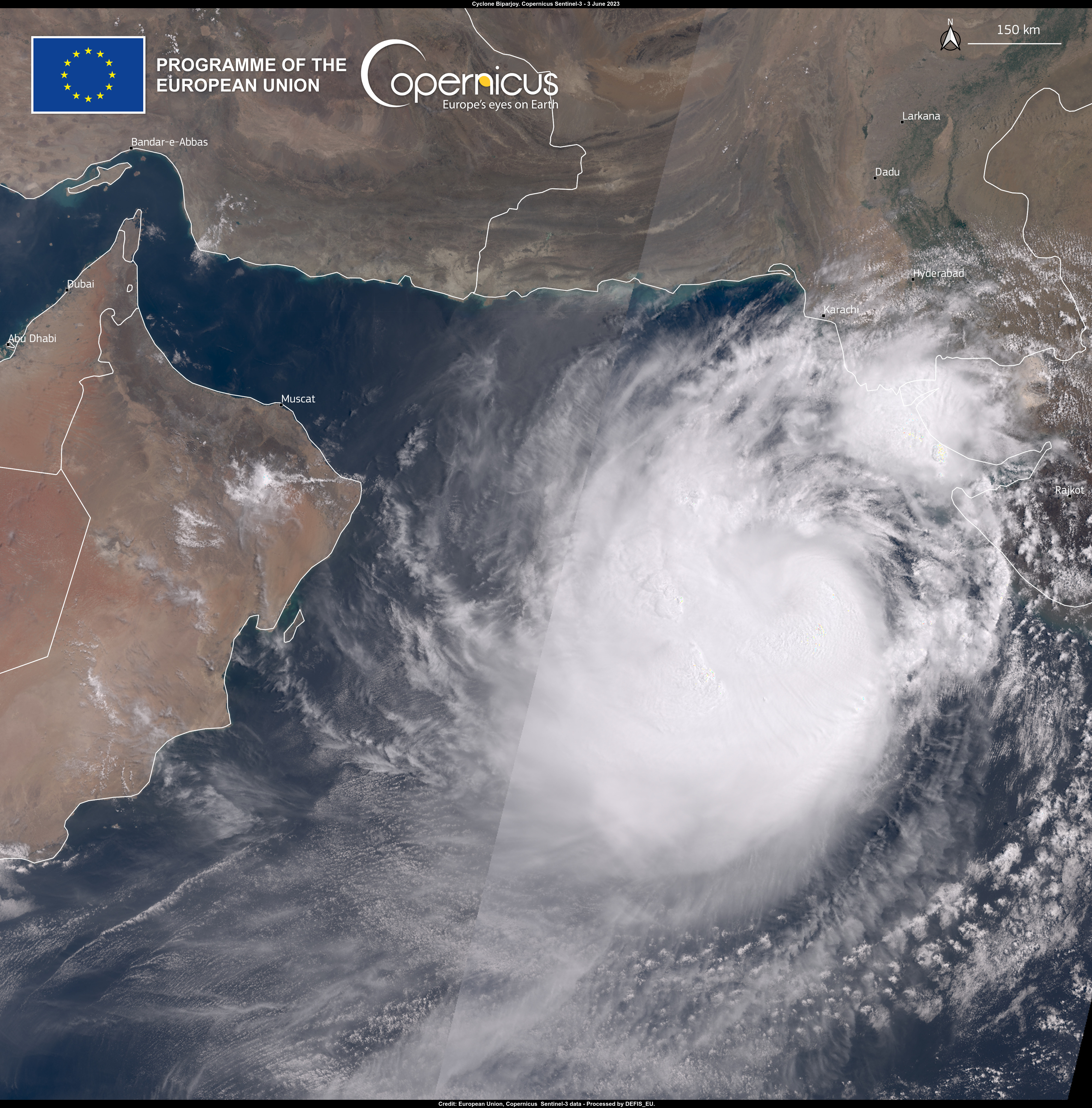
Cyclone Biparjoy approaching the India–Pakistan border on 14 June

=== Pakistan ===
To lessen the potential effects of Cyclone Biparjoy, authorities, and stakeholders, particularly the Provincial Disaster Management Authority (PDMA), have taken proactive preparations. Meetings with stakeholders have been held to create coordination and readiness plans. Relevant authorities have been tasked by the PDMA with identifying high-risk areas, launching public awareness campaigns, creating evacuation plans, and ensuring the safe evacuation of locals from exposed coastal areas. Authorities removed billboards and signboards across Karachi and advised a voluntary evacuation of coastal residential neighborhoods in Karachi.

A total of 81,000 individuals were evacuated from the south-eastern coast, and authorities have established 75 relief camps at schools to assist. The weather office predicted heavy rains and strong winds for the districts of Karachi, Hyderabad, Badin, Tando Allahyar, Umerkot, Mirpurkhas, Tharparkar, Mithi Shaheed Benazirabad, and Sanghar. The areas likely to be affected include Thatta, Badin, Sajawal, Tharparkar, Karachi, Mirpurkhas, Umerkot, Hyderabad, Tando Allah Yar Khan, and Tando Mohammad Khan districts. It is estimated that approximately 9,000 households (approx. 55,000 people) are at risk of direct impact. Widespread wind-dust, thunderstorm activity, and heavy rainfall are expected mainly in districts of Sindh.

=== India ===
India's meteorological department issued alerts to local authorities in Gujarat on 12 June 2023, urging them to be prepared for potential evacuations. Residents in coastal regions were advised to remain indoors as the cyclone approached the land. The Gujarat government took action by deploying national and state disaster response teams to the vulnerable areas. Apart from Gujarat, the cyclone was anticipated to bring rainfall to several other states along India's western and southern coasts. The IMD predicted heavy downpours in certain regions of Maharashtra, Karnataka, and Goa.

According to officials in Gujarat state, a total of 94,000 individuals have been safely evacuated from coastal regions. The weather office issued warnings about potential blackouts and floods in the region. Train services were suspended, and operations at the major ports of Kandla and Mundra came to a halt. Furthermore, the Indian Coast Guard conducted the evacuation of 50 workers from an oil rig located off the Gujarat coast. Authorities advised people to refrain from visiting beaches, while fishermen were instructed not to venture into the sea. Within a 0–10 km (0.0–6.2 mi) radius of Mandvi Beach, authorities carried out the evacuation of all residents. The evacuation efforts were supported by teams from the army, navy, and state and national relief forces. During the cyclone, 1206 pregnant women were safely shifted to different hospitals and health and wellness centers from the affected areas, out of which 707 women gave birth.

== Impact ==
=== India ===
Gujarat's coastal areas experienced heavy rains and strong winds, resulting in the loss of three lives in Kutch and Rajkot districts. Trees were uprooted, and a wall collapsed due to the severe weather conditions. Additionally, in Kutch, strong waves swept away tents situated on Mandvi Beach. As the cyclone approached the coast, the Dwarka region experienced high tides. Total damage in Gujarat was valued at ₹1212.5 crore (US$148 million), though the Indian National Congress estimated damage statewide at ₹8,000–10,000 crore (US$0.98–1.22 billion). The neighboring state of Maharashtra also witnessed heavy rains and high tidal waves. Four boys who had gone missing after venturing into the Arabian Sea near Mumbai's Juhu area were found deceased. A total of 23 people were injured as well as 4,600 villages were affected by power outages. Five people died in Rajasthan. Hospitals in northwest India received a high number of people who had been bitten by snakes after a cyclone hit the region Rajasthan. In July 2023, the Government of Gujarat announced relief package of ₹240 crore (US$29 million) for farmers. The government estimated crops and trees spread across 130,000 hectares (320,000 acres) of land was damaged by the cyclone.

=== Pakistan ===
Between 16 and 17 June, an estimated 1.2 million people were reported to be affected by winds of 90–120 km/h (55–75 mph). Heavy gusts and rains caused 4 fatalities and 5 injuries, and damaged 2,460 houses and destroyed 190.

== See also ==
- Weather of 2023
- Tropical cyclones in 2023
- List of tropical cyclones in Pakistan
- List of Gujarat tropical cyclones
- 1999 Pakistan cyclone – a deadly cyclone that caused more than 6,000 deaths in Pakistan
- Cyclone Vayu (2019) – a cyclone that took a similar path to Biparjoy
- Cyclone Maha (2019) – a powerful tropical cyclone that made landfall in Gujarat as a tropical depression
- Cyclone Tauktae (2021) – a strong tropical cyclone that devastated Gujarat and had a similar track to Biparjoy
