= 2022–2023 global food crises =

Increase in food prices and shortages around the world

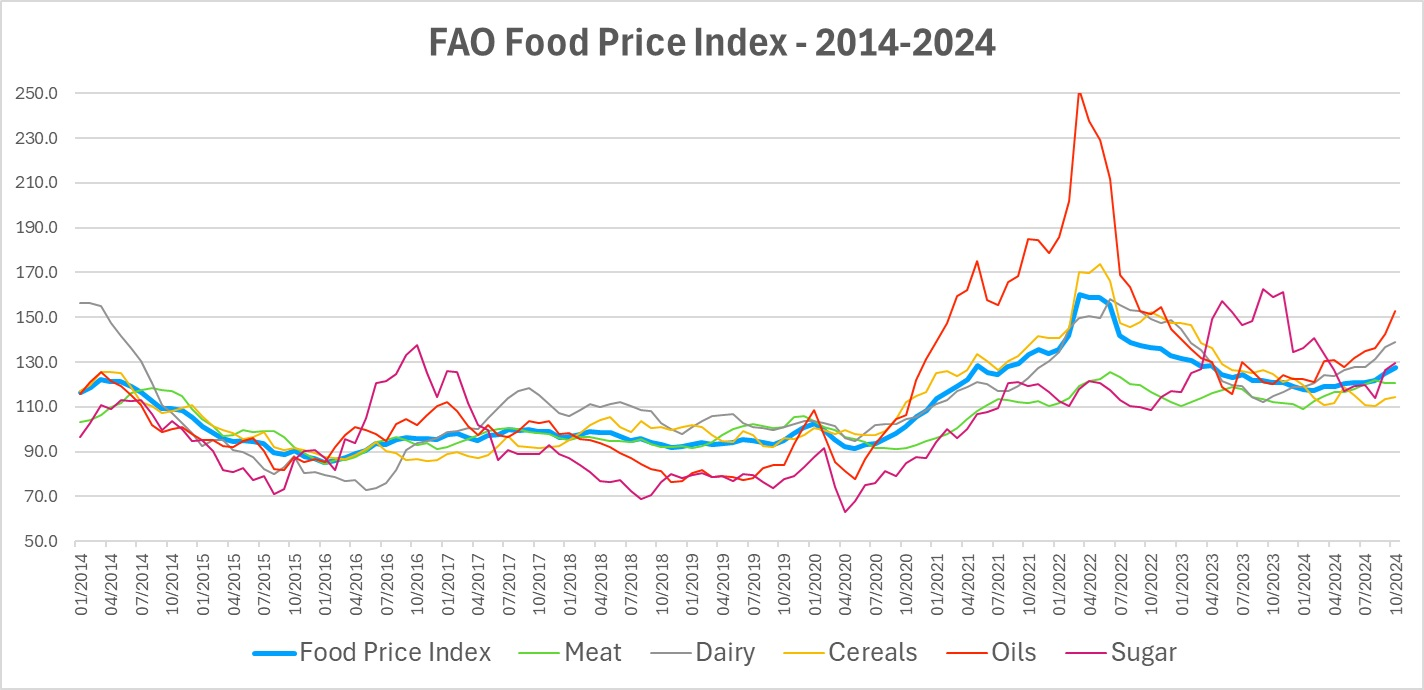
Food Price Index with 5 major commodities groups – 2014–2024 Food Price Index Meat Dairy Cereals Oils Sugar

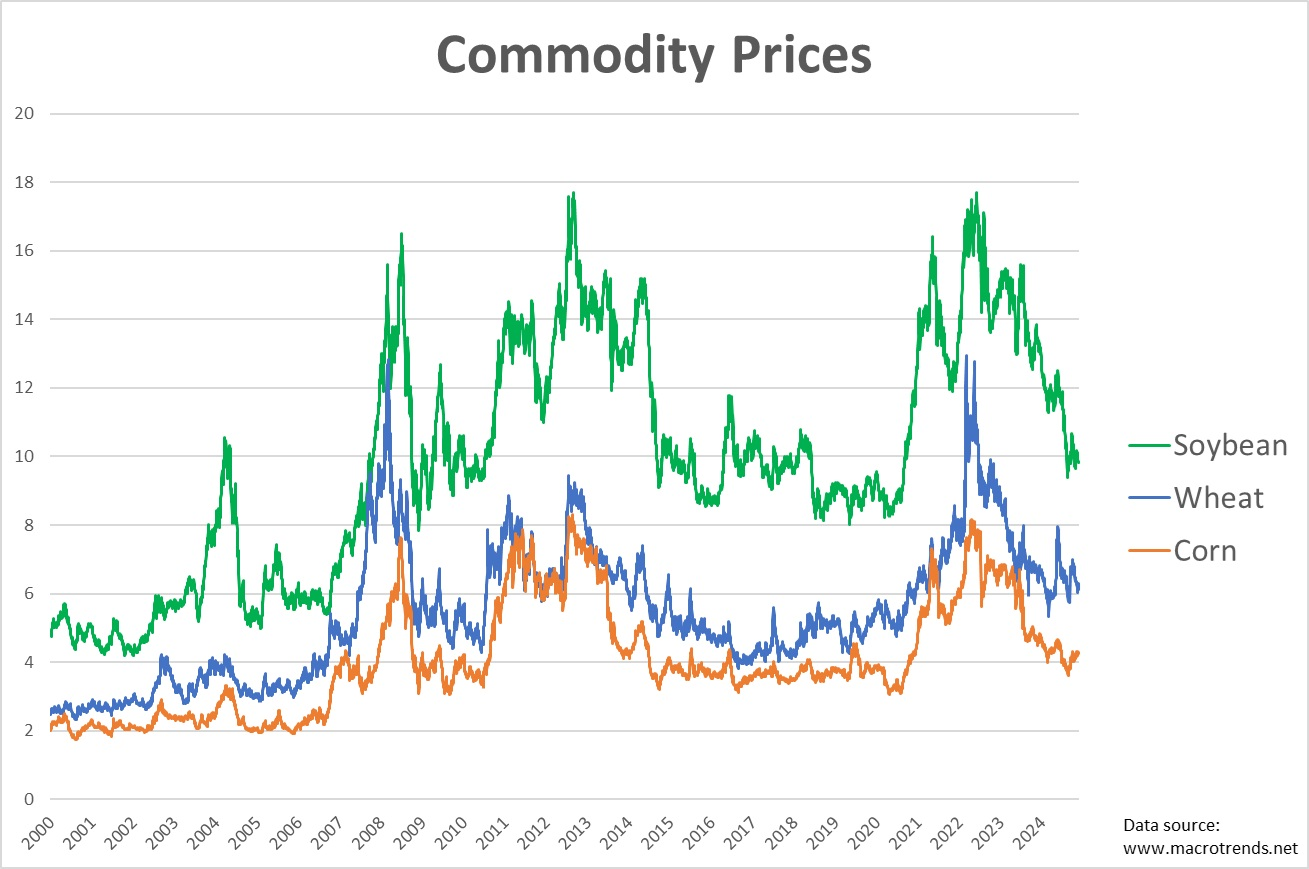
Prices of soybean, wheat and corn – 2000–2024 Soybeans Wheat Maize

During 2022 and 2023 there were food crises in several regions as indicated by rising food prices. In 2022, the world experienced significant food price inflation along with major food shortages in several regions. Sub-Saharan Africa, Iran, Sri Lanka, Sudan and Iraq were most affected. Prices of wheat, maize, oil seeds, bread, pasta, flour, cooking oil, sugar, eggs, chickpeas and meat increased. Many factors contributed to the world food crisis. These include supply chain disruptions due to the COVID-19 pandemic, the Global energy crisis (2021–2023), the Russian invasion of Ukraine, and floods and heatwaves during 2021 (which destroyed key American and European crops). Droughts were also a factor; in early 2022, some areas of Spain and Portugal lost 60–80% of their crops due to widespread drought.

Even before the Russian invasion of Ukraine, food prices were already at a record high. 82 million East Africans and 42 million West Africans faced acute food insecurity in 2021. By the end of 2022, more than 8 million Somalis were in need of food assistance. In February 2022, the Food and Agriculture Organization (FAO) reported a 20% rise in food prices since February 2021. The war further pushed this increase to 40% in March 2022 but was reduced to 18% by January 2023. But the FAO warned that inflation of food prices would continue in many countries.

Increased fuel and transport prices have made food distribution worse and more complex. Before the Russian invasion, Ukraine was the fourth-largest exporter of maize and wheat. Since then, the Russian invasion crippled supplies. This resulted in inflation and scarcity of these commodities in dependent countries. Global food reserves have also decreased due to the effects of climate change on agriculture.

This caused food riots and famine in different countries. Furthermore, China acquired 51% of the world supply of wheat, 60% of rice, and 69% of maize stockpiles in the first half of 2022. The United States increased its farm production by April 2022, also contributing $215 million in development assistance plus $320 million for the Horn of Africa. A grain agreement was signed by Russia, Ukraine, Turkey and the United Nations to open Ukrainian ports. This resulted in grain shipment by 27 vessels from Ukraine between June and August 2022 which stalled in October and then resumed in November 2022. In addition, the World Bank announced a new $12 billion fund to address the food crises.

The World Economic Forum's Global Risks Report 2023 described food supply crises as a global risk. The Russian invasion of Ukraine and crop failures from climate change worsened worldwide hunger and malnutrition. Even Global North countries known for stable food supplies were impacted. Analysts described this food inflation as the worst since the 2007–2008 world food price crisis. However, in early 2024, the FAO reported a return to more moderate commodities market prices. Moreover, the World Economic Forum's 2024 Global Risks Report showed significantly less concern from experts but the report still highlighted a risk of the Gaza war and the return of El Niño. Both of these events could disrupt supply chains again.

== Price increases by region ==
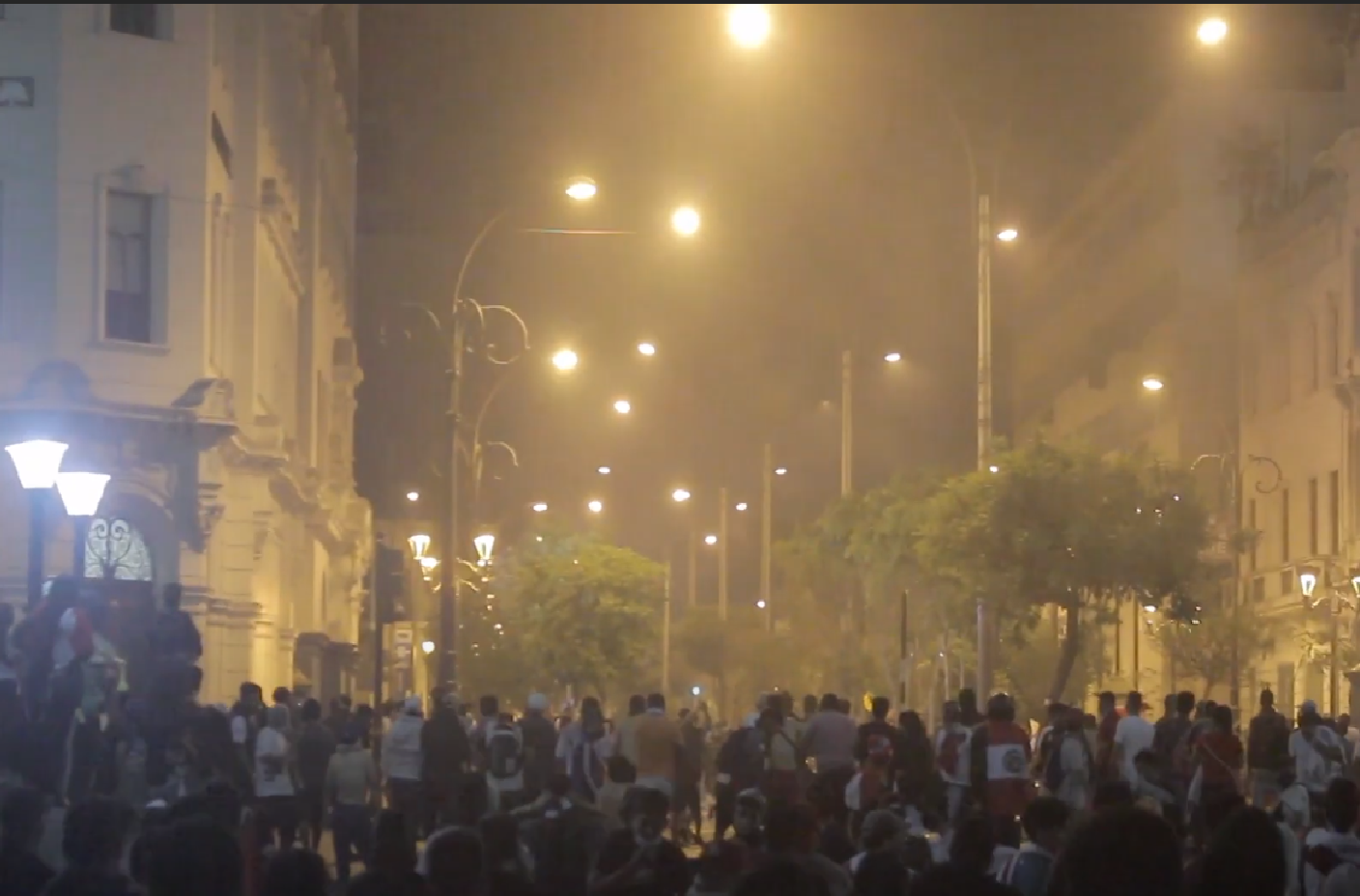
2022 Peruvian protests due to increased food and fuel prices

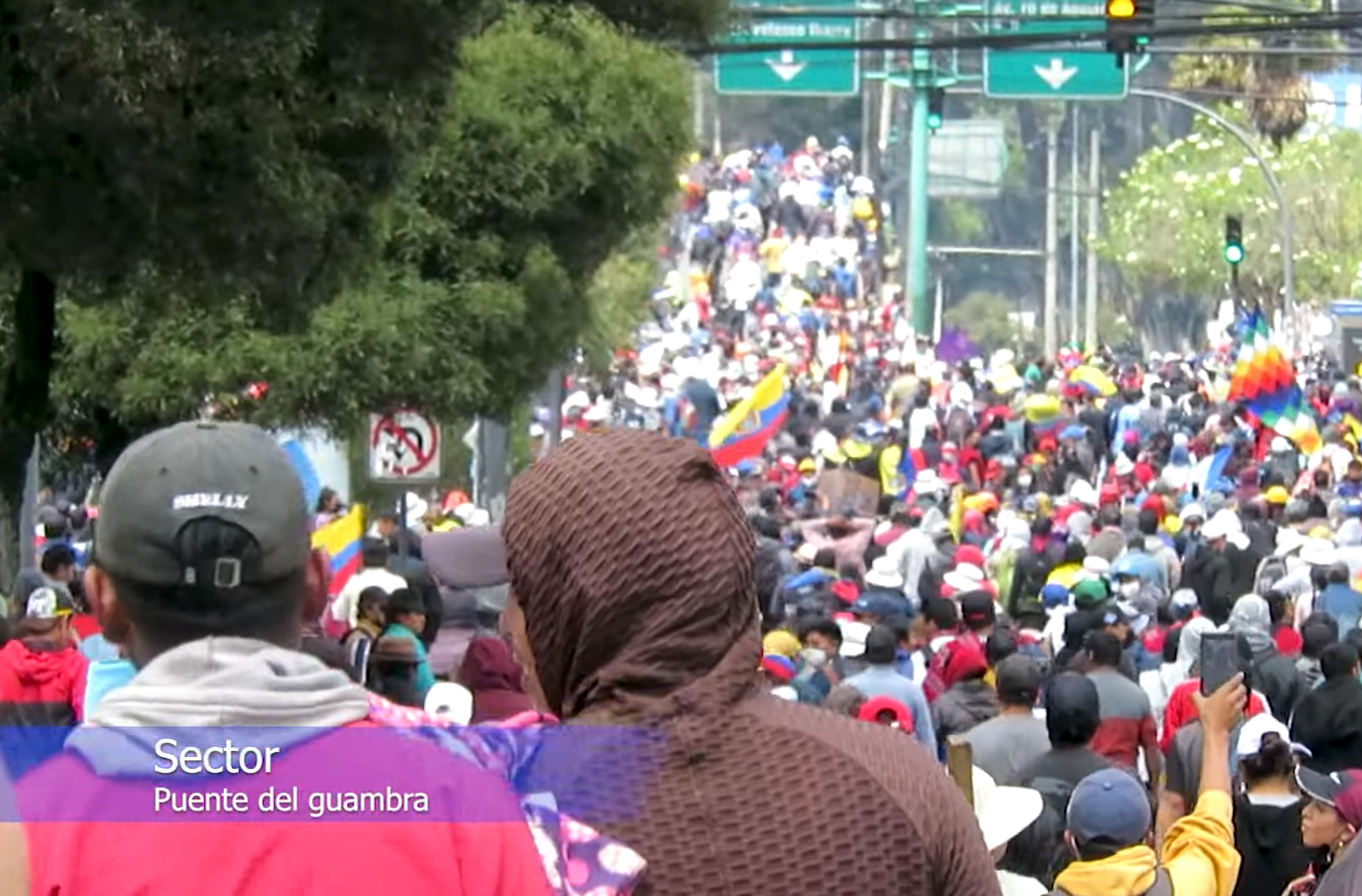
2022 Ecuadorian protests against the economic policies of Ecuadorian president Guillermo Lasso, triggered by increasing fuel and food prices

Rises in food prices have affected parts of Asia, Africa and Latin America. Protests and food riots have occurred in more severely affected countries such as Iran, Sri Lanka, Sudan, and Iraq. There have also been riots and other forms of unrest due to food prices rising in Albania, Kenya, Indonesia, Peru, Ecuador, Panama, Argentina, Tunisia, and Lebanon.

=== Africa and MENA ===
Price increases for certain staples, such as wheat, were expected to most severely affect countries like Egypt, Turkey, and Somalia in MENA and East Africa, which rely heavily on wheat imports from Ukraine and Russia. This is expected to further hurt prices in regional food markets, such as Ethiopia, Kenya, Somalia, and South Sudan.

The changes in the food market caused by the invasion of Ukraine further exacerbated existing drought problems in the already vulnerable Horn of Africa. In February, the World Food Programme (WFP) and UNICEF had already projected nutrition and hunger gaps for thirteen million people in East Africa. By March, the UN had expanded that number to 20 million people.

==== Iran ====
In May 2022, ongoing protests in Iran escalated into nationwide civil unrest as a result of government price hikes on staple foods including bread and pasta. The protests were part of a countrywide wave of protests beginning in July 2021. Protests were initially concentrated in the drought-stricken province of Khuzestan, but rapidly spread nationwide. Authorities responded by declaring riot control action and blocking internet access.

Prior to the start of the demonstrations, preceding and during International Workers' Day on 1 May, Iran preemptively detained 38 teachers in order to stymie planned nationwide protests during National Teachers' Day on 2 May. Workers' protests had increased over the past year as the result of a deterioration in living conditions caused by the re-imposition of US sanctions against Iran during the administration of Donald Trump and the economic effects of the COVID-19 pandemic. After the Iranian government ended subsidies for imported wheat, the price of flour soared by around 500%, exacerbating current inflation, which hovered around 50%.

The protests, beginning on 6 May in Khuzestan, were initially associated with the rising cost of living. However, they rapidly escalated into anti-Mullah demonstrations. Ranchers in at least 10 cities allegedly staged demonstrations at offices of the Iranian Agricultural Ministry, with pensioners participating in similar demonstrations. Large scale demonstrations reportedly broke out in the city of Dezful, and reportedly spread into the cities of Khafajia, Hawizeh, and Shiraz.

==== Syria ====
The United Nations reported that 90% of the country's population lives in poverty, and that more than half is food insecure.

==== West Africa ====
Oxfam, ALIMA and Save the Children warned that the food crises in West Africa could affect 27 million people, especially in Burkina Faso, Niger, Chad, Mali, and Nigeria.

During a May 2022 visit to Nigeria, the Secretary-General of the United Nations said the war in Ukraine has made the food, energy, and economic crises worse in Africa as a whole.

On 2 June 2022, Chad declared a national food emergency.

==== Kenya ====
Northern Kenya experienced the worst drought in 40 years that left 4.4 million people acutely food insecure, with 1.2 million facing emergency hunger levels. The U.N. Development Program said rising food and energy prices caused by COVID-19 and the Russian war in Ukraine hit Sub-Saharan Africa hardest. Kenyan chapati makers are shrinking the size of their dough balls to make ends meet.

==== Yemen ====
The main cause of the famine in Yemen is the Yemeni Civil War. Aid often cannot effectively reach the population because of the blockade of Yemen by Saudi Arabia which started in 2015. 17.4 million do not have enough food and malnutrition levels in Yemen are among the highest in the world.

==== Tunisia ====
By May 2022, wheat prices in Tunisia had risen to over $430 per tonne, more than double the cost from 2021 due to supply interruptions caused by the COVID-19 pandemic and Russia's invasion of Ukraine. Tunisia imports over 95% of the soft wheat used in its bread, increasing its purchases by $250 million in 2022.

=== Asia ===
==== Bangladesh ====
International Monetary Fund (IMF) forecasted Consumer Price Index (CPI) in Bangladesh to rise to 5.9% by the year 2022. The price of cooking oil, sugar, eggs and chickpeas increased sharply, which contributed a great deal to the inflation. According to the Bangladesh Bureau of Statistics, general inflation climbed to 6.17% by February 2022. Government officials link local prices to the global market situation and necessary steps taken to stabilize price hikes due to these conditions. But some experts point to government failures as a cause of the price hikes, in addition to Russia's invasion of Ukraine. Before the invasion of Ukraine, 95% of the cooking oil in Bangladesh was imported from overseas. The price of cooking oil per barrel was $700 then, it went up to $1,940 prior to the invasion. The price of liquified petroleum gas (LPG) also increased 12% by March. Overall gouging of food prices resulted in largescale protests in the country.

==== Afghanistan ====
Following the Taliban takeover of 2021, Western nations cut much of their humanitarian aid to Afghanistan. This led to a lack of access to food, water, shelter, and health care for much of the Afghani population. The Biden administration froze about $9 billion of the Afghan central bank's assets, which blocked the Taliban from having access to funds held in US bank accounts. In October 2021, the UN stated that more than half of Afghanistan's 39 million people faced an acute food shortage.

The price increases connected to Russia's invasion of Ukraine may worsen the economic crises in Afghanistan that followed the US withdrawal. According to the UN, $4.4bn is needed to pay for increased food costs, with human rights experts calling on the US to unblock assets of the Afghan central bank to ease humanitarian crisis.

==== India ====
6 out of every 10 Indians are dependent on state-delivered subsidised food. Though early reporting and government policy after the price increases following the war in Ukraine for wheat suggested India was well positioned to export more wheat, by end of April a heatwave that was projected to decrease harvests, increasing local prices, and fertilizer price increases projected a shortfall rather than an export-friendly market. The decrease in harvests was largely driven by the 2022 Indian heat wave which severely reduced the wheat harvest, killing the plants during the final weeks where they were usually growing.

On 13 May 2022, India, the world's second largest producer of wheat, prohibited wheat exports. IMF chief Kristalina Georgieva urged India to reconsider its ban on wheat exports.

On 20 July 2023, India's government announced that it would stop exporting the widely consumed non-basmati white rice. On 25 August 2023, India imposed a 20 percent duty on exports of parboiled rice.

==== Pakistan ====
Agricultural fields in Pakistan were devastated by the 2022 Pakistan floods. The immediate causes of the floods were heavier than usual monsoon rains and melting glaciers that followed a severe heat wave, both of which are linked to climate change.

==== Indonesia ====
Extreme price increases for cooking oil sparked student protests and other civil unrest. The national government of Indonesia banned export of palm oil. As Indonesia is the largest producer of palm oil, and with a harvest decline in the second largest producer and neighbor Malaysia, the ban caused severe global supply chain disruptions and further exacerbated the price increases caused by the loss of Russian and Ukrainian oil exports and failures of soy crops in South America. Following protests by palm farmers, the ban was lifted in late May after being in effect for around three weeks.

==== Sri Lanka ====
Sri Lanka was much more harshly affected by the food crisis as it was already facing mass man-made crop failures due to a total ban on chemical fertilizer by President Gotabaya Rajapaksa, resulting in rice production in Sri Lanka falling by 40–50%, while other crops also suffered large losses with some even reaching 70% loss even before it was affected by the Russian crisis. The 2022 Sri Lankan protests escalated in part due to food shortages and post-COVID-19 pandemic inflation. By the time government reversed the ban on chemical fertilizer the Russian invasion of Ukraine had caused fertilizer prices to rise making it unaffordable for Sri Lanka which had defaulted on its loans after nearly running out of forex reserves. On 9 May, Sri Lankan Prime Minister Mahinda Rajapaksa resigned from his position after protests on the country's economic crisis turned violent.

=== Europe ===
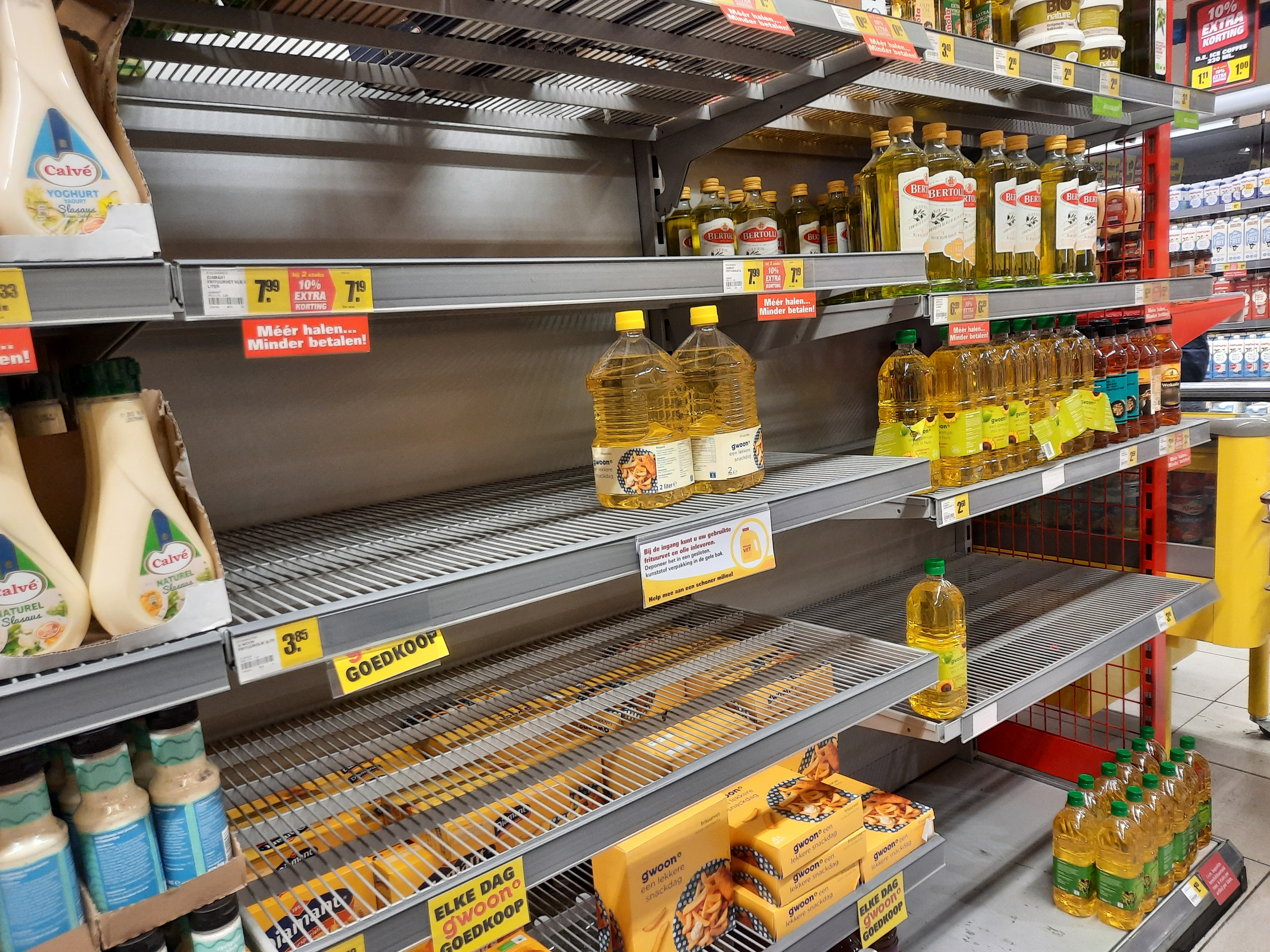
Immediately following the invasion of Russia, some foods saw shortages throughout Europe, such as this empty shelf for vegetable oil in the Netherlands.

Europe's energy crisis and the 2022 Russian invasion of Ukraine caused significant price increases for European fertilizer and food industries. According to Julia Meehan, the head of fertilizers for the commodity price firm ICIS, "We are seeing record prices for every fertilizer type, which are all way above the previous highs in 2008. It's very, very serious. People don't realize that 50% of the world's food relies on fertilizers."

In 2022, Europe's driest summer in 500 years had a negative impact on European agricultural production.

==== United Kingdom ====
Starting on 21 February 2023, supermarkets in the United Kingdom, such as Asda, Morrisons and Tesco, began rationing fruit and vegetables. The Telegraph gave the cause as "poor foreign harvests and a domestic farming crisis". The shortages were expected to last several weeks, and in a YouGov poll, 61% of UK respondents said they had personally noticed or experienced food shortages in their local shop or supermarket during mid-to-late February. Research from Kantar showed grocery price inflation hit its highest level since records began in 2008, with food inflation reaching 17.1% in February.

=== North America ===
North America was already experiencing significant shortfalls and supply chain issues connected to the 2020–2023 North American drought and the 2021–2023 global supply chain crisis. The supply chain crisis was also one factor in infant formula shortages in the US.

==== Haiti ====
Along with protests and civil unrest against the government of Haiti in response to rising energy prices and the rising cost of living, as well as armed gang violence and an outbreak of cholera, Haiti is experiencing widespread acute hunger. On 14 October 2022, the WFP reported that a record 4.7 million people (almost half of the country's population) were facing acute hunger in Haiti; using the Integrated Food Security Phase Classification (IPC) scale, the WFP classified 19,000 of those people as belonging to the fifth and highest level on the scale, the "Catastrophe" phase (IPC 5).

=== South America ===
==== Argentina ====
In May 2021, Argentina banned all meat exports to curb inflation.

==== Chile ====
The 2022 food crises added to the mounting inflation in Chile since 2020. Measured by the change in the Índice de Precios al Consumidor, the (IPC) in March 2022 relative to March 2021 indicated an inflation rate of 1.9%, the highest known since October 1993. Bread and meat prices increased as well as those of food in general. Cooking oil prices rose, with a particular brand at a Santiago supermarket experiencing a 90% price increase from April 2021 to April 2022.

The inflation in food prices is thought to be behind an increasing number of supermarket credit cards issued in 2022 as well as increasing rates of supermarket credit card debt default. In April 2022, President Gabriel Boric announced a $3.7 billion economic recovery plan that included an increase in the minimum wage to help people deal with rising prices. Supermarkets belonging to Cencosud begun rationing cooking oil, rice and flour in late April.

== Causes ==
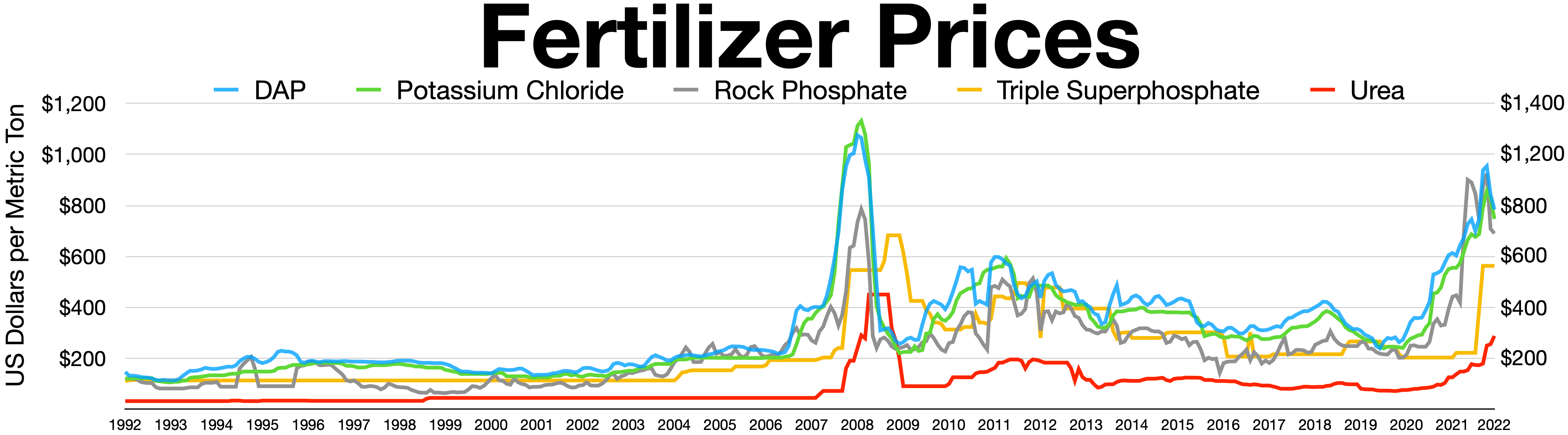
Fertilizer prices 1992–2022. The 2007–2008 world food crisis happened when fertilizer prices spiked. DAP Potassium chloride Phosphorite Triple superphosphate Urea

The COVID-19 pandemic significantly disrupted food supply chains around the world, disrupting distribution channels at the consumption and distribution stages of the food industry. A rise in fuel and transport prices further increased the complexity of distribution as food competed with other goods. At the same time, significant floods and heatwaves in 2021 destroyed key crops in the Americas and Europe.

=== Energy crisis ===
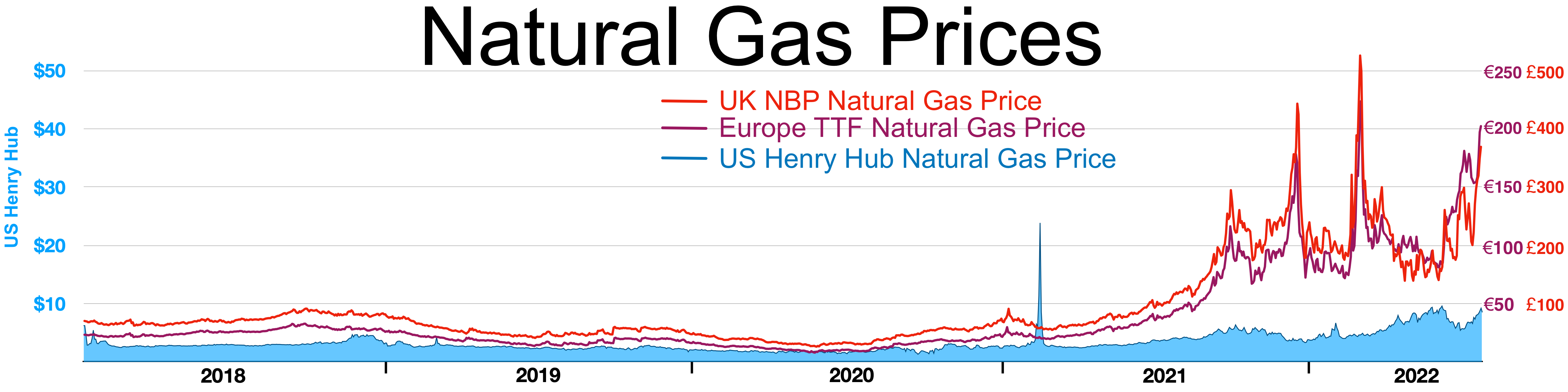
Natural gas prices in Europe and United States National Balancing Point NBP (UK) natural gas prices Europe TTF natural gas prices United States Henry Hub natural gas prices

Natural gas is a major feedstock for the production of ammonia, via the Haber process, for use in fertilizer production. The development of synthetic nitrogen fertilizer has significantly supported global population growth — it has been estimated that almost half the people on the Earth are currently fed as a result of synthetic nitrogen fertilizer use.

Since 2021, the 2021–2023 global energy crisis has spread to the fertilizer and food industries. According to Julia Meehan, the head of fertilizers for the commodity price agency ICIS, "We are seeing record prices for every fertiliser type, which are all way above the previous highs in 2008. It's very, very serious. People don't realise that 50% of the world's food relies on fertilisers." The impact of agricultural input costs, including fertilizer and fuels, on food prices has been shown to be larger than the effect of the curtailment of food exports from Russia and Ukraine.

=== Russian invasion of Ukraine ===
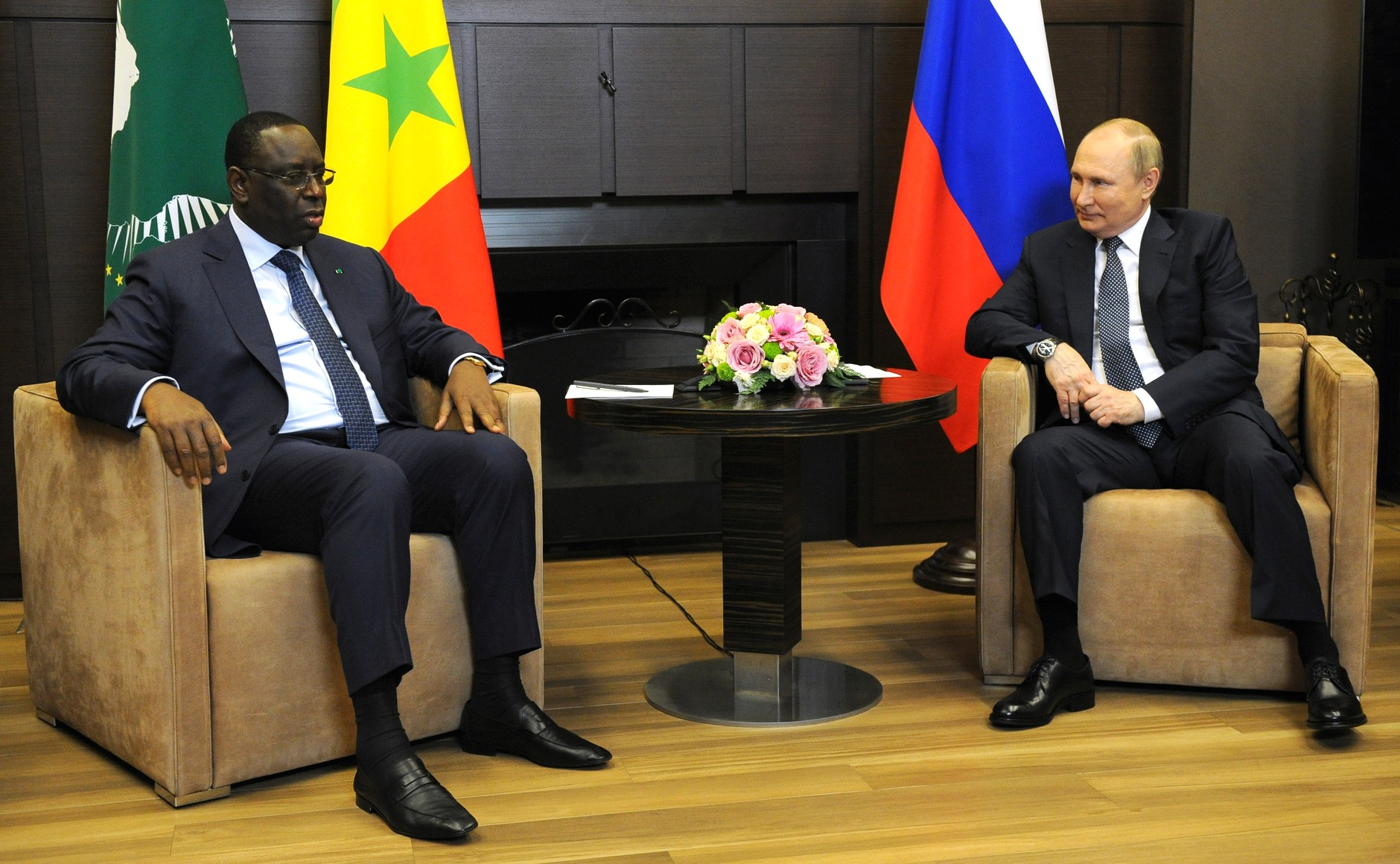
Russian President Vladimir Putin met with the President of the African Union, Macky Sall, to discuss grain deliveries from Russia and Ukraine to Africa, 3 June 2022

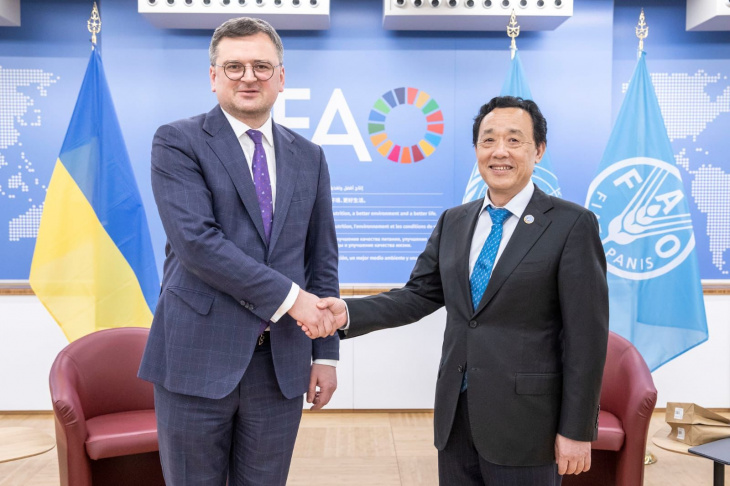
Foreign Minister of Ukraine Dmytro Kuleba met with the Director-General of the Food and Agriculture Organization (FAO) Qu Dongyu, to discuss technical support to facilitate Ukraine's food exports, 26 April 2023

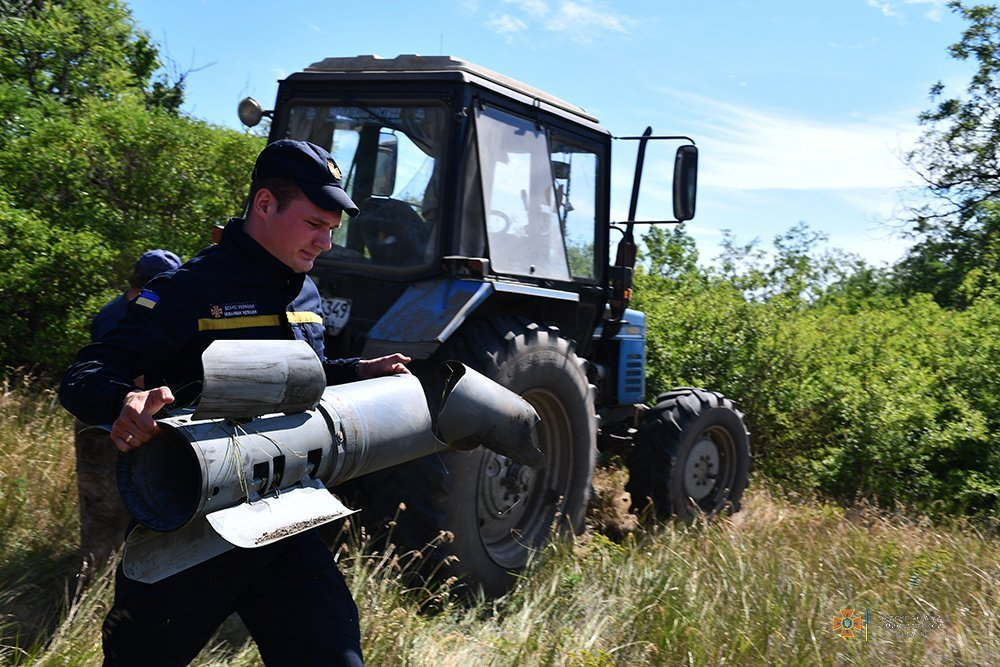
Member of the State Emergency Service of Ukraine carrying an unexploded Russian bomb in an agricultural field in southeastern Ukraine, 1 July 2022. The Russian invasion of Ukraine disrupted all parts of the grain agriculture and grain trade from Ukraine, further stressing a global supply chain that had already been seeing major price increases.

From February 2 to April 1, Russia banned the export of ammonium nitrate (AN) to guarantee supplies for domestic farmers following the spike in global fertilizer prices, which were impacted by rising costs for natural gas. The conflict has affected virtually all economies, however, the most affected economies are in Europe and Africa. Most of these economies have explored to find alternative food supply chain partners and solutions in North America, South America, the Middle East, Australasia, and some regions of Asia and Africa that have been less affected by this conflict.

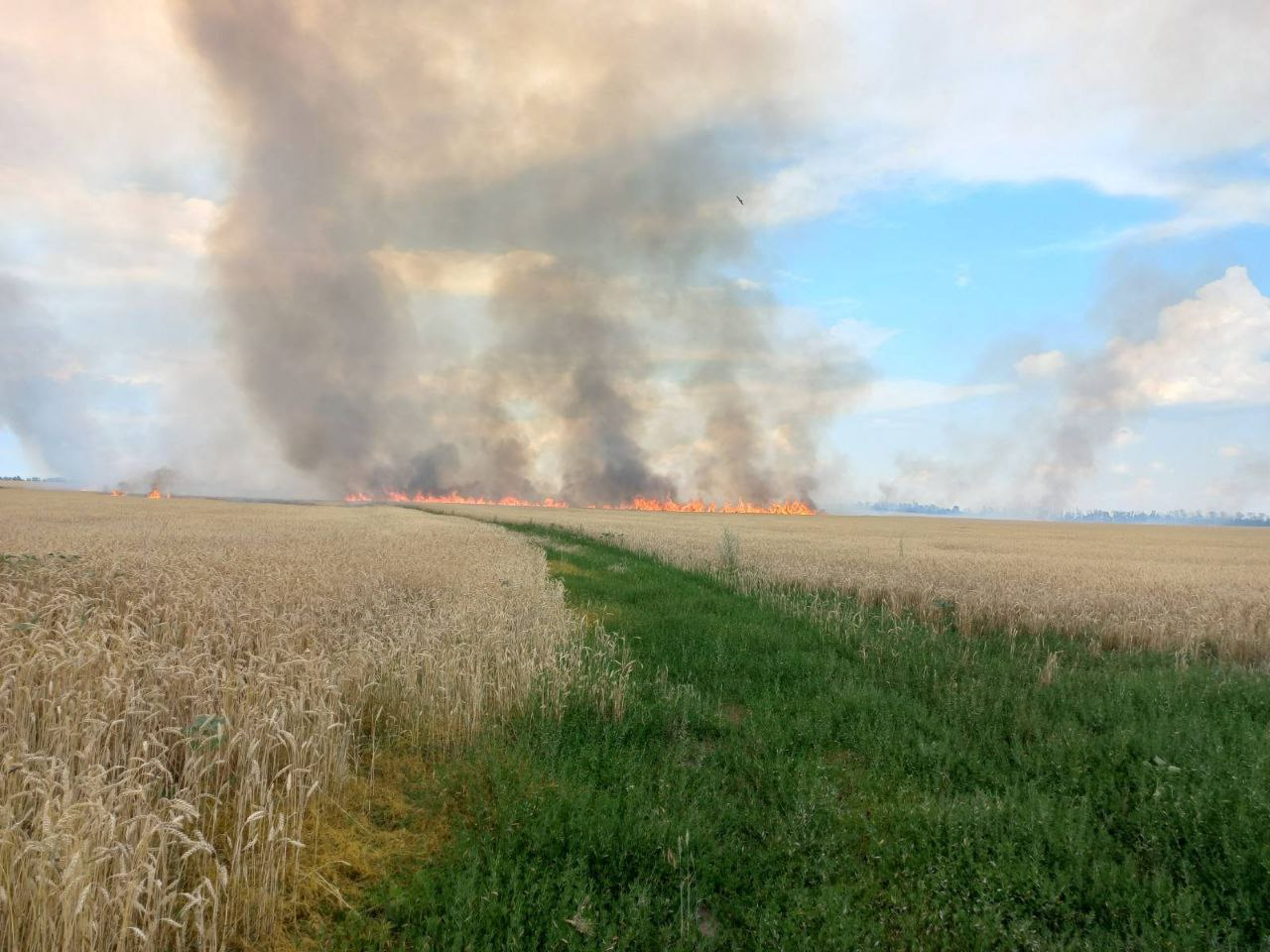
A burning wheat field near Andriivka, Kharkiv Oblast after Russian shelling on 5 July 2022

Wheat prices surged to their highest prices since 2008 in response to the 2022 attacks. Ukraine accounted for 10% of global wheat exports. At the time of the invasion, Ukraine was the fourth-largest exporter of corn and wheat, and the world's largest exporter of sunflower oil, with Russia and Ukraine together responsible for 27% of the world's wheat exports and 53% of the world's sunflowers and seeds. The head of the World Food Programme, David Beasley, warned in March that the war in Ukraine could take the global food crisis to "levels beyond anything we've seen before".

A potential disruption to global wheat supplies could exacerbate the ongoing hunger crisis in Yemen, Afghanistan and East Africa. The American Bakers Association president warned that the price of anything made with grain would begin rising as all the grain markets are interrelated. The chief agricultural economist for Wells Fargo stated that Ukraine will likely be severely limited in their ability to plant crops in spring 2022 and lose an agricultural year, while an embargo on Russian crops would create more inflation of food prices. Recovering crop production capabilities may take years even after fighting has stopped.

Surging wheat prices resulting from the conflict have strained African countries such as Egypt, which are highly dependent upon Russian and Ukrainian wheat exports, and have provoked fears of social unrest. At least 25 African countries import a third of their wheat from Russia and Ukraine, and 15 of them import more than half from those two countries. On 24 February, the Chinese government announced that it would drop all restrictions on Russian wheat as part of an agreement that had been reached earlier in February; the South China Morning Post called this a potential "lifeline" for the Russian economy.

=== Effects of climate change ===
Multiple heat, flooding, and drought events between 2020 and 2022 significantly hurt global food supplies and reserves. These weather events, which have been connected with climate change, made the food system less resilient to shocks like the war in Ukraine. Global reserves of wheat were extremely low at the beginning of 2022 because of these weather events. During the year 2022, many similar events connected to climate change continue to severely reduce agriculture production in the world.

There are numerous effects of climate change on agriculture, many of which are making it harder for agricultural activities to provide global food security. Recent research has found that climate change is likely to exacerbate the existing environmental impacts of agriculture by lowering crop productivity, reducing the effectiveness of agrochemicals, increasing soil erosion and pest pressures, and thereby driving greater use of land, water and inputs. Rising temperatures and changing weather patterns often result in lower crop yields due to water scarcity caused by drought, heat waves and flooding. One study found that 1°C of warming was associated with a 3 to 7% decrease in global yields of major staple crops. These effects of climate change can also increase the risk of several regions suffering simultaneous crop failures. Currently this risk is rare but if these simultaneous crop failures occur, they could have significant consequences for the global food supply. With a growing population and rapid urbanization, it is suggested that food production may increase by nearly 60% in the upcoming years. Many pests and plant diseases are expected to become more prevalent or to spread to new regions. The world's livestock are expected to be affected by many of the same issues. These issues range from greater heat stress to animal feed shortfalls and the spread of parasites and vector-borne diseases.

The increased atmospheric CO_{2} level from human activities (mainly burning of fossil fuels) causes a CO_{2} fertilization effect. This effect offsets a small portion of the detrimental effects of climate change on agriculture. However, it comes at the expense of lower levels of essential micronutrients in the crops. Furthermore, CO_{2} fertilization has little effect on C4 crops like maize. On the coasts, some agricultural land is expected to be lost to sea level rise, while melting glaciers could result in less irrigation water being available. On the other hand, more arable land may become available as frozen land thaws. Other effects include erosion and changes in soil fertility and the length of growing seasons. Bacteria like Salmonella and fungi that produce mycotoxins grow faster as the climate warms. Their growth has negative effects on food safety, food loss and prices.

Extensive research exists on the effects of climate change on individual crops, particularly on the four staple crops: corn (maize), rice, wheat and soybeans. These crops are responsible for around two-thirds of all calories consumed by humans (both directly and indirectly as animal feed). The research investigates important uncertainties, for example future population growth, which will increase global food demand for the foreseeable future. The future degree of soil erosion and groundwater depletion are further uncertainties. On the other hand, a range of improvements to agricultural yields, collectively known as the Green Revolution, has increased yields per unit of land area by between 250% and 300% since 1960. Some of that progress will likely continue.

Researchers have proposed gene editing as a solution, a technology with the potential to alleviate global food shortages by enhancing crop yields and increasing the resilience of crops to unpredictable climate fluctuations.

==== Drought in the Middle East and North Africa (MENA) ====
Climate change in Iraq is leading to increasing water scarcity which will likely have serious implications for the country for years to come. Additionally, Iraq's water security is based on the declining Tigris–Euphrates river system.

==== East African drought ====
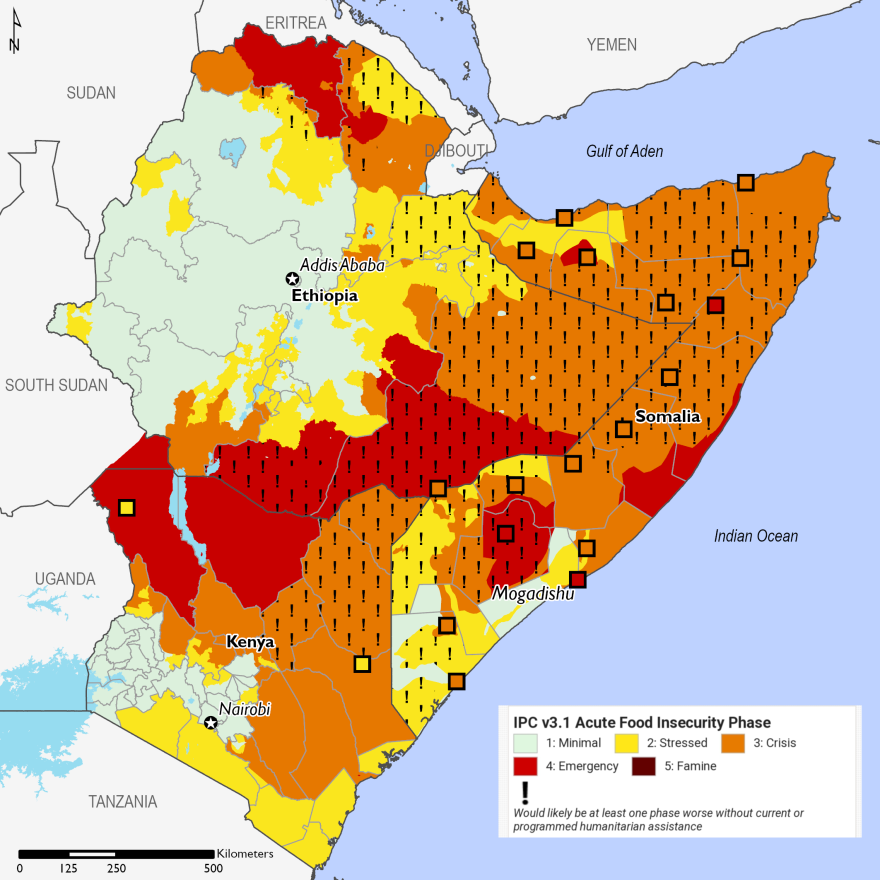
Famine Early Warning System's map of the region between October 2022 and January 2023

A drought in East Africa began in 2021 and further intensified in 2022, precipitated in part by the oncoming La Niña in 2022. Three rainy seasons failed in the Horn of Africa, destroying crops and killing large herds of livestock. In Somalia, five rainy seasons have failed, Kenya and Sudan were also strongly affected. The UN identified 20 million people at risk of famine. Both wildlife and livestock have been killed by the drought. The region is especially vulnerable because an extreme wet season caused the 2019–2022 locust infestation, which destroyed large regions of crops.

By early October 2021, nearly a year after the Tigray War started, Mark Lowcock, who led OCHA during part of the Tigray War, stated that the Ethiopian federal government was deliberately starving Tigray, "running a sophisticated campaign to stop aid getting in" and that there was "not just an attempt to starve six million people but an attempt to cover up what's going on."

82 million East Africans and 42 million West Africans faced acute food insecurity in 2021.

By the end of 2022, more than 8 million Somalis were in need of food assistance – roughly half of Somalia's population. The rainy season of 2022 was recorded to be the driest in over 40 years, with an estimated 43,000 in Somalia dying in 2022.

==== Madagascar drought ====
In mid-2021, a severe drought in southern Madagascar caused hundreds of thousands of people to suffer from food insecurity. In October 2022, UNICEF contributed with $23 million for children suffering from the famine, with a third of the population suffering from the disaster, according to researchers cited by the Financial Times.

==== North American heatwave and drought ====
Drought significantly reduced harvests in North America including the United States which produces a quarter of the world grains. The years from 2020 to 2021 were the driest in centuries in North America. The production of crops in the Midwest declined by 20% in this period.

==== European extreme weather ====
Droughts in Spain and Portugal during early 2022 led to 60–80% loss predictions for crops in some areas. The huge amount of precipitation in March and early April 2022 in mainland Spain provided relief but did not fully revert the meteorological drought. Fruit crops in most of Europe were damaged by a cold wave that caused freezing rain, frost, and snow during early budding, after a period of unseasonably early warm weather.

Additional drought in Italy, has reduced the flow of fresh water near the Po river, which is responsible for 40% of crop production in the country. Salt water intrusion is expected to greatly reduce the viability of crop production in areas near the delta.

In February 2023, the UK Government called the major supermarket bosses to discuss on filling the salads restock. As country is entering the pick shortage in third week. Some biggest Britain's grocery shops, Tesco (TSCO.L), Asda, Morrisons and Aldi, restricted the supply of cucumber, tomatoes and peppers to customers, due to unreasonable weather conditions, which brought shortage in supplies from southern Europe and North Africa. The crisis worsened due to less winter production in greenhouse of Britain and the Netherlands effected due to high energy cost. Both factors affected the shortage of food in Britain Supermarket.

==== South Asian heat wave ====
During the 2022 food crises, India began taking steps to export more rice and wheat, in part to fill the gaps created by the Russian invasion of Ukraine. However, the heatwave caused increasing local prices and lower supply, issues also exacerbated by the war increasing fertilizer prices. The heatwave occurred mostly during the final weeks of the wheat growing season, killing the plants shortly before harvest.

The heatwave significantly impacted agriculture in India. At the same time early rainfall in India was 71% lower than the norm. In Punjab, the main crop producer in India, 15% of the harvest was lost and in some regions even 30%. The heatwave caused a reverse in policy by Indian government, from trying to import to address the crises, to halting exports.

The heatwave has also severely impacted peach and apple harvests in Balochistan.

==== Southern Cone heat wave ====
A heatwave that deeply affected Argentina, Uruguay, Paraguay, and Southern Brazil caused yield declines for maize, soy, and other key grains, resulting in significant global commodity price increases. The heatwave further exacerbated an already dry season in much of the region. Drought made 28% of the agricultural territory of Brazil "no longer climatically optimal"

==== Australian floods ====
A severe flood in New South Wales during February 2022 caused the complete destruction of soy and rice crops and 36% of macadamia nut production. Animal herds and farming infrastructure were also severely damaged by the flooding, which was the third major natural disaster to agriculture communities in the region.

=== Supply chain failures ===
In a May 2022 editorial for the Guardian, environmental George Monbiot described part of the collapse of food supply, a problem of concentration of supply in a handful of supply chains through the "Global Standard Diet" making the food system vulnerable to critical failures. He compared the food system failures to the 2008 banking crises, in terms of similar structural problems of concentration of economic power.

In China, rolling lockdowns as part of a zero-COVID policy significantly reduced key agricultural inputs for important grain crops. Before that, China already maintained its food stockpiles at a "historically high level" in 2021, because of an trade war with the United States. The deal and negotiation with U.S. and Australia could also be prodding China to buy food reserves.

=== Ethanol for fuel ===
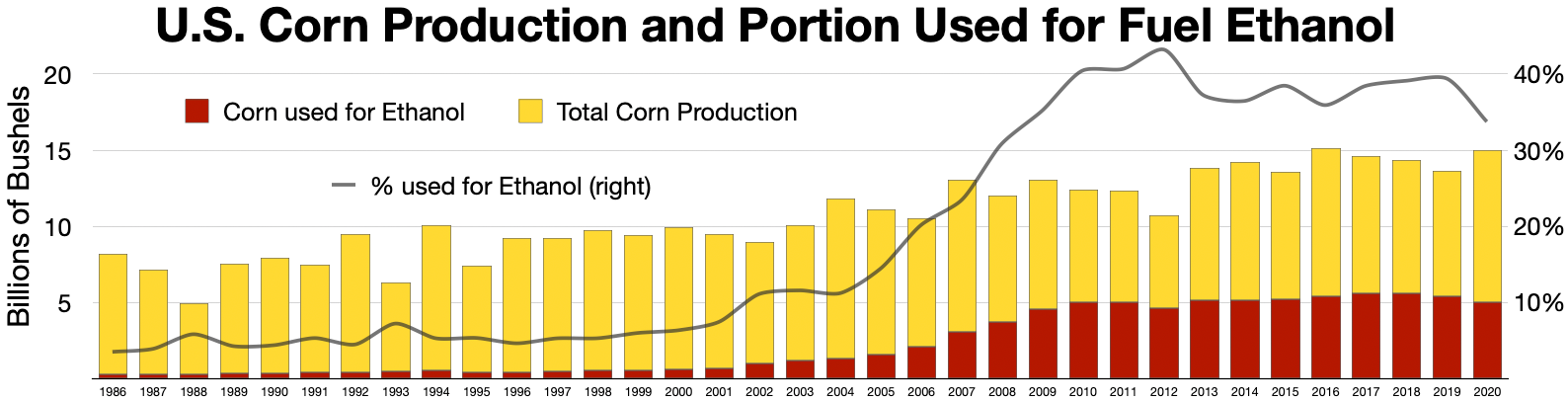
Corn vs Ethanol production in the United States Total corn production (bushels) (left) Corn used for Ethanol fuel (bushels) (left) Percent of corn used for Ethanol (right)

Ethanol fuel makes up about 10% of motor vehicle gasoline produced and consumed in 2021, and around 40% of maize grown is used for ethanol fuel in the United States each year. Because it is 33% less efficient than petroleum gasoline miles driven from ethanol is less than 10%.

=== Meat consumption ===
Rising meat consumption means a corresponding increase in demand for animal feed, especially maize and soybeans, which contributes to higher food prices.

== Responses ==
=== China ===
By the first half of the agricultural year 2022, according to the U.S. Department of Agriculture, China acquired 50% of the world supply of wheat, 60% of rice, and 69% of maize. China has maintained its food stockpiles at a "historically high level", contributing to higher global food prices. Bloomberg columnist Adam Minter wrote that "For China, such stockpiles are necessary to ensure it won't be at the mercy of major food exporters such as the U.S."

=== United States ===
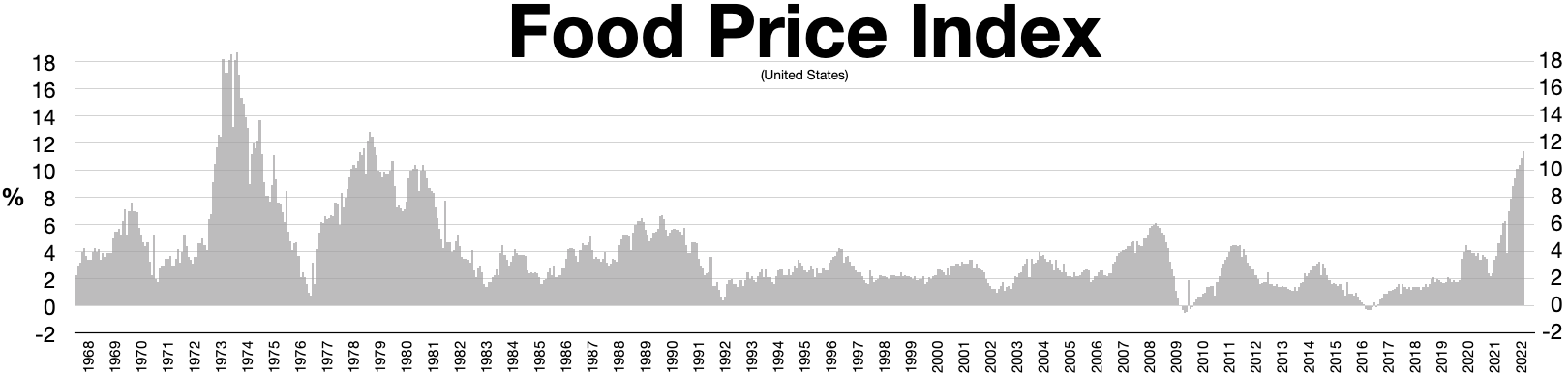
Food Price Index United States

The Biden administration responded to the growing shortages in April by trying to increase US farm production. The US policy community was worried about China or other countries filling the food gap. Obstruction in the US Congress prevented new funding and resources for the crises. A group of 160 advocacy groups challenged funding cuts by the Biden administration and Congress to USDA programs.

On 18 May 2022, the US announced $215 million in development assistance to mitigate the crises. This was in addition to $320 million for the Horn of Africa.

=== Germany ===
Germany is working on a proposal to phase out the use of biofuels produced from food crops by 2030. Up to 40% of corn produced in the US is used to make ethanol, and worldwide 10% of all grain is turned into biofuel. A 50% reduction in grain used for biofuels in the US and Europe would replace all of Ukraine's grain exports.

=== Russia ===
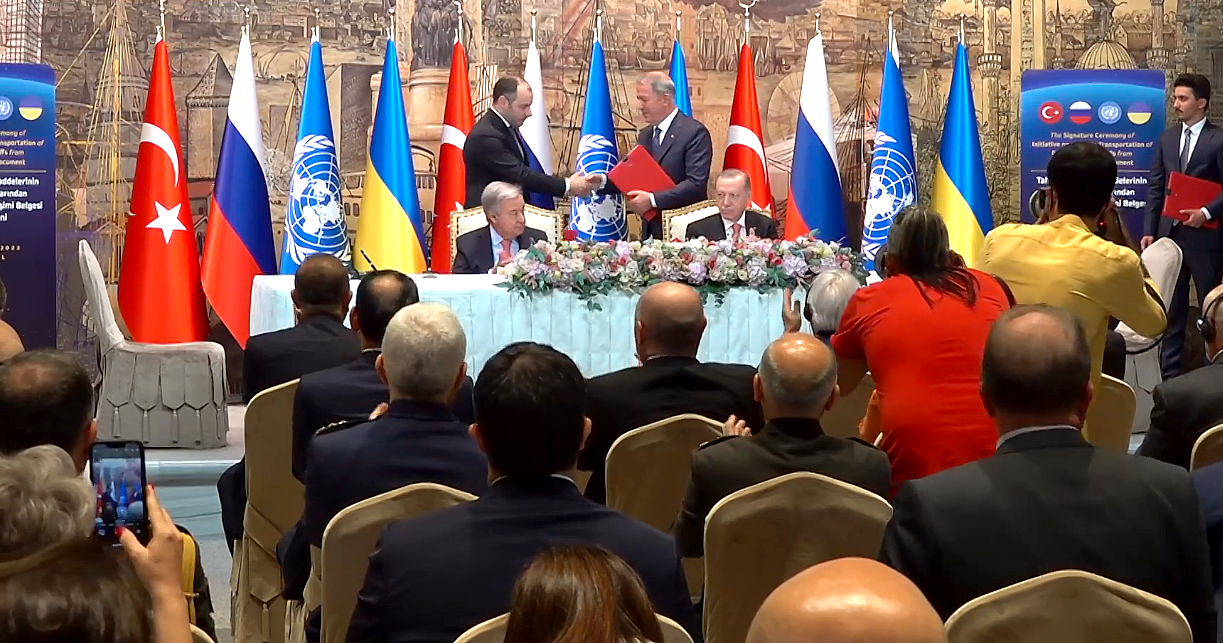
Signing ceremony of the Black Sea Grain Initiative in Istanbul

On 30 June 2022, Russia withdrew its troops from Snake Island to not obstruct U.N. attempts to open a humanitarian corridor allowing grains to be shipped from Ukraine. On 16 July, major news outlets reported that Kyiv is definitely a step closer to being able to export grain through its Black Sea ports after talks with Russia, facilitated by Turkey, and the United Nations. Russia was accused of blocking crucial shipments of grains from Ukrainian ports but claims its exports are impacted by economic sanctions. On 23 July, Russia shelled the port of Odesa which had recently been unlocked.

The first shipment since the grain agreement was set off for Lebanon, where the Sierra Leone-flagged ship Razoni carried the cargo of corn. As of August 20, the total number of vessels leaving Ukraine in accordance with the agreement reached 27.

On 14 September 2022, UN Secretary-General Antonio Guterres reiterated his concerns over a constrained fertilizer supply from Russia due to the 2022 Russian invasion of Ukraine and subsequent economic sanctions. According to the source, UN diplomats held discussions to re-open the Togliatti–Odesa pipeline carrying ammonia. President Volodymyr Zelenskyy had offered such a move in exchange for the release of prisoners of war held by Russia. But TASS news agency quoted Kremlin spokesman Dmitry Peskov, who dismissed such an idea, as saying "are people and ammonia the same thing?".

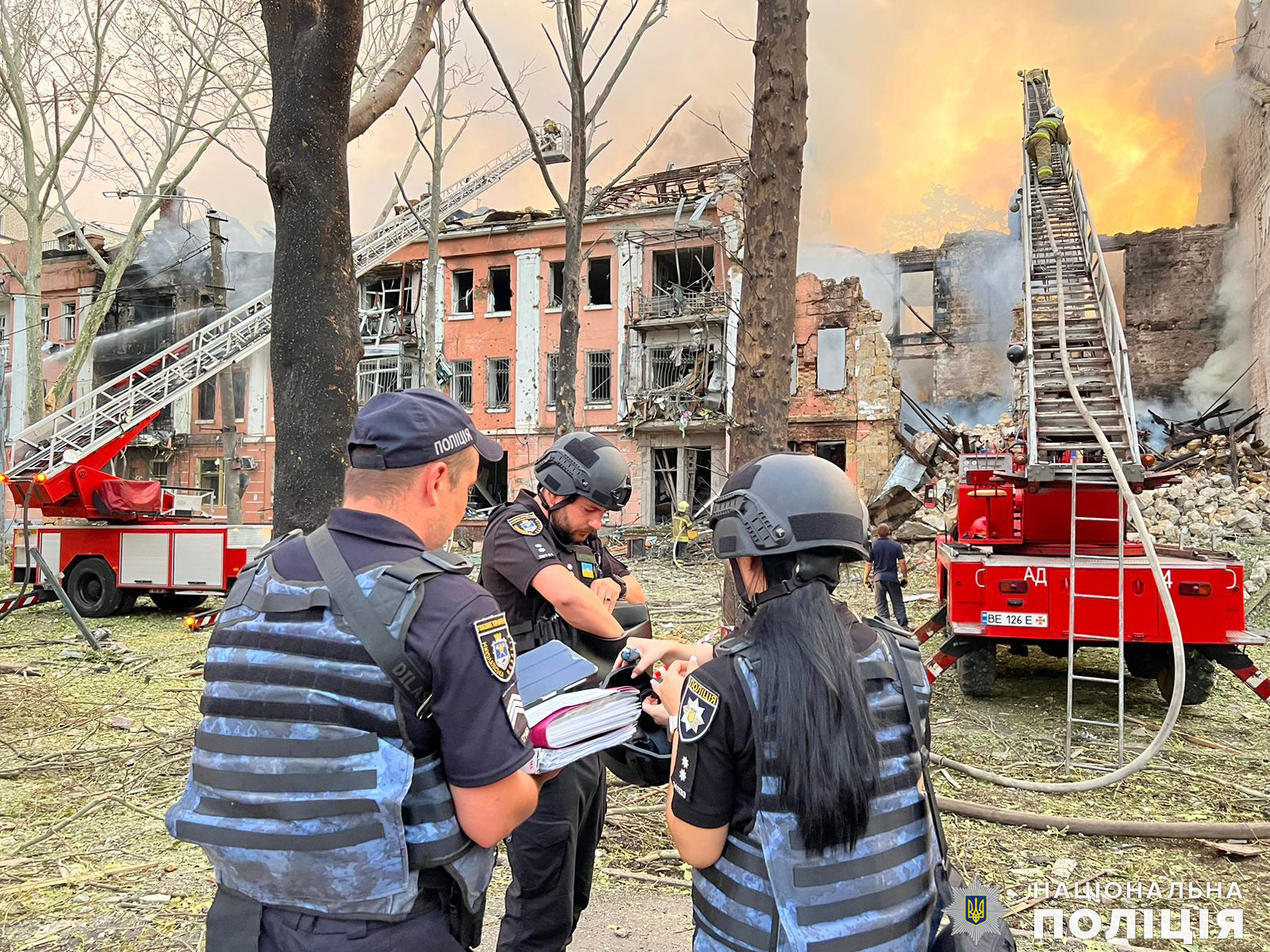
Following Vladimir Putin's withdrawal from the grain deal, Russia launched a series of attacks on the Ukrainian port cities of Odesa and Mykolaiv.

On 29 October 2022, Russia suspended participation in grain initiative. However, vessel traffic will resume on November 3.

On 17 July 2023, Russian President Vladimir Putin withdrew from a deal that allowed Ukraine to export grain across the Black Sea despite a wartime blockade, risking deepening the global food crisis and antagonizing neutral countries in the Global South. Following Putin's withdrawal from the grain deal, Russia launched a series of attacks on the Ukrainian port cities of Odesa and Mykolaiv. Russia's Defense Ministry said the strikes were in retaliation for the 2023 Crimean Bridge explosion, but Ukraine said Russia was attacking civilian infrastructure linked to grain exports.

Kenyan senior foreign ministry official Abraham Korir Sing'Oei said that Russia's decision "to exit the Black Sea Grain Initiative is a stab [in] the back" and the resulting rise in global food prices "disproportionately impacts countries in the Horn of Africa already impacted" by the worst drought in four decades.

=== International organizations ===
The World Bank announced a new $12 billion fund to address the food crises.

In May 2022, Máximo Torero, chief economist at the U.N. Food and Agriculture Organization, warned European politicians that if they move away from natural gas production too soon, the price of fertilizers will rise and more people in the world will suffer from hunger.

In May 2022, the United Nations called for Russia to facilitate the reopening of Ukrainian grain ports to mitigate the global food crises.

== See also ==
- 2021–2023 global supply chain crisis
- Global energy crisis (2021–2023)
- 2021–2023 inflation surge
