= 2022 Panamanian protests =

Series of civilian protests against the Panamanian government in 2022

- Part of 2021–2022 global energy crisis, 2022 food crises and the economic impact of the 2022 Russian invasion of Ukraine
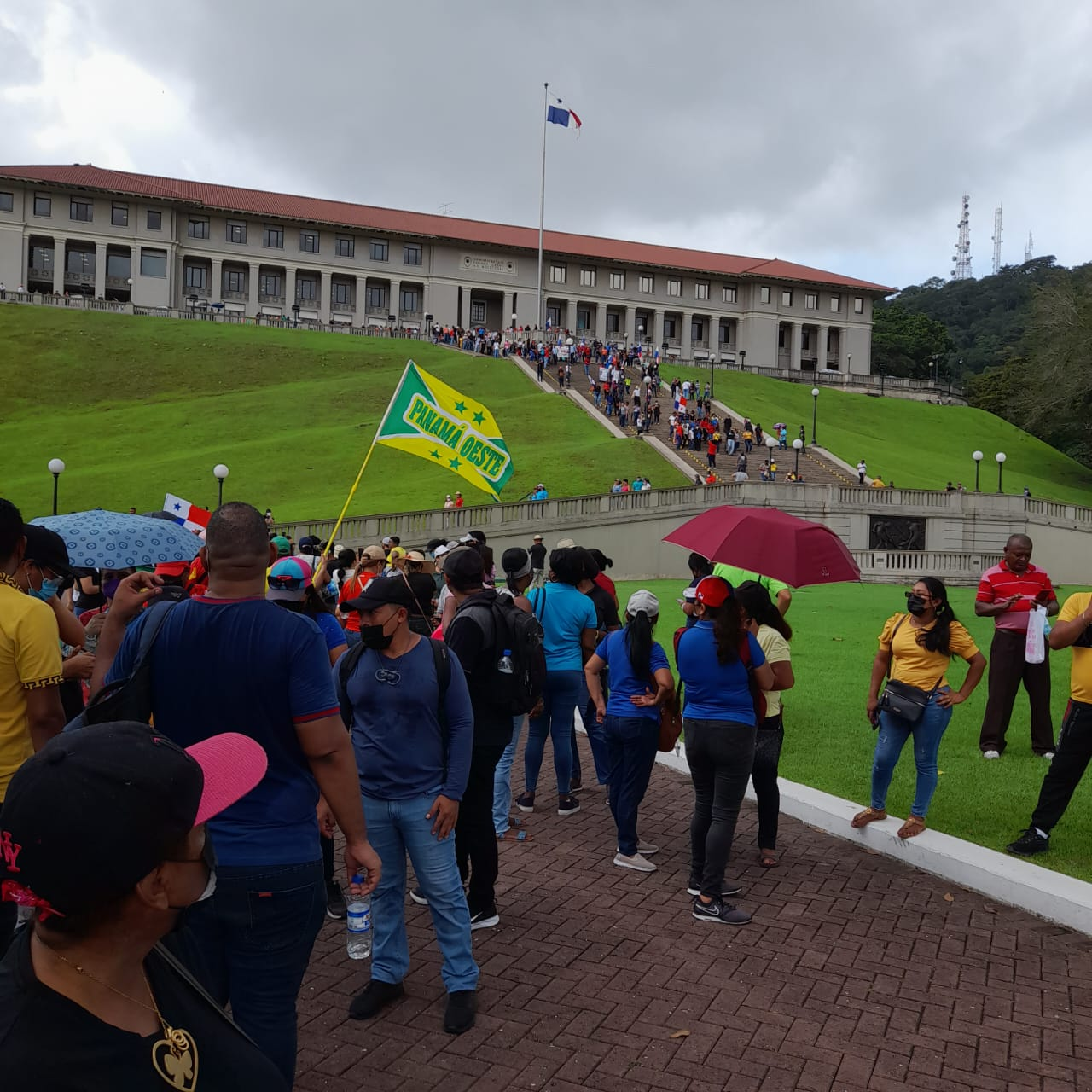
- Teacher unions demonstrating in front of the Panama Canal Administration Building on 20 July 2022.
- Date: 1 July 2022 – 10 August 2022 (1 month, 1 week and 3 days)
- Location: Panama
- Caused by: Fuel price increase; Cost of living crisis; Inflation due to the COVID-19 pandemic and the 2022 Russian invasion of Ukraine; Corruption and economic policies of Laurentino Cortizo's government
- Goals: Price reduction, including the freezing of fuel price; Withdrawal of controversial laws approved by the National Assembly; Resignation of President Laurentino Cortizo and Vice President José Gabriel Carrizo; Allocation of 6% of national GDP for education by 2024
- Methods: Labor strike, protests, demonstrations, civil resistance and online activism
- Result: Agreement to end the strike between the Ministry of Education and public teachers unions, including the restart of classes until 30 December; Dialogue table between the government and the unions, with the Catholic Church as mediator; Fuel price freeze in B/. 3.30 for three months nationally, through a publicly-funded government incentive.; New road closures and protests as of 10 August due to the lack of agreements in the dialogue

Parties
Protesters: Teacher unions; Labor unions; SUNTRACS; Indigenous groups; Other civil groups	Government of Panama: National Police of Panama

Lead figures
Non-centralized leadership	Laurentino Cortizo; José Gabriel Carrizo; Juan M. Pino

Number
Tens of thousands	Thousands

In July 2022, protests broke out in Panama. They were reportedly triggered by rising inflation, corruption, and a cost of living crisis. The economy has suffered as a result of the COVID-19 pandemic, and the Russo-Ukrainian War. On 18 July, Panama City saw the country's largest protest. President Laurentino Cortizo's government deal to cut fuel prices was rejected by trade unions. Protestors blocked sections of the transcontinental Pan-American Highway. On 27 July, security minister Juan Manuel Pino Forero said that the roads were clear for the first time. On 2 August, the teachers strike concluded.

== Background ==
The government initially selectively froze fuel for collective and selective transportation carriers at US$3.95/gallon at the start of June; they subsequently extended the price freeze to transporters of agricultural cargo. After this price freeze, the National Assembly celebrated the re-election of its president, Crispiano Adames. This joined a long list of other complaints of corruption which have not been investigated by the corresponding authorities, like the approval of the re-election of the rector of the Universidad Autónoma de Chiriquí or the supposed nepotism in the management of the Assembly payroll.

== See also ==
- 2023 Panamanian protests
- 2022 food crises
- 2021–present global energy crisis
- List of protests in the 21st century
