= Inflation in Chile =

Increase in prices in Chile

Inflation in Chile has been a significant issue for the economy since the start of the 20th century. During the 2020s Chile again surfaced as an economic problem during the second presidency of Sebastián Piñera (March 2018–March 2022) and has remained such. Current inflation has been attributed to a series of private pension fund withdrawals allowed by the Congress of Chile in response to the economic hardships of the COVID-19 pandemic in Chile. Besides this, food prices are held by the Food and Agriculture Organization to have increased as consequence of the 2022 Russian invasion of Ukraine.

Central Bank autonomy, inflation targeting and counter-cyclical fiscal rules are important elements in the Chilean state policy to keep inflation low.

== History of inflation in Chile ==
Starting in 1878, the Chilean state increased the issuing of new banknotes (fiat currency) causing the Chilean peso to devaluate. When the War of the Pacific began in 1879 the government issued more fiat currency in order to afford the costly war, and continued to do so in 1880 and 1881. In 1881 the country prepared for a return to the gold standard and to gradually eliminate fiat currency. However, during the Chilean Civil War in 1891 the government of José Manuel Balmaceda issued more fiat money to finance this new war. By 1891 a dispute begun between those who supported a return to gold convertibility of money ("oreros") and those who opposed convertibility ("papeleros"). In 1892 the "oreros" succeeded in having the convertibility of currency approved by law and in December 1895 non-convertible legal tender was pulled out of circulation. In 1898 the convertible regime collapsed once again in the face of severe economic instability (crop failure, war scare) and was abolished. Issuing of fiat money then continued until 1907 but from there on currency was issued with convertibility to gold or saltpetre mining related legal titles.

Edwin W. Kemmerer, referred to in an expression of the time as the money doctor, was invited to Chile in 1925 to deal with monetary policy and inflation problems which were considered one of the principal economic problems of Chile at the time. The visit by Kemmerer was used to back up monetary policies already outlined by Chileans. These reforms included the creation of a central bank, the establishment of a government budget law and general bank law. All these reforms were established by rule by decree by Arturo Alessandri who had been reestablished in power following a coup d'etat against him in 1924 (where the coup-makers protested among other things against inflation). Gold convertibility was established in 1925. As result of these reforms Chile managed to tame inflation to such degree that over the 1890–1980 period, the 1920s were the decade with least inflation. Another consequence of the reforms was an increased easyness by Chile to obtain loans not only in the United States but also in the United Kingdom, Switzerland and Germany. In the years after the visit of Kemmerer there was a sharp increase in foreign investments. The Great Depression in Chile brought initially a period of deflation of currency followed by inflation in 1931 and 1932. The inflation was brought under control momentarily after 1932 but resurfaced again in 1936.

=== 1940s to 1960s ===
Much of Chile's chronic inflation in the 1945-1989 period was in part caused by government budget deficits financed by "money printing". In general terms budged deficit and other causes of inflation were related with internal as well as external economic turmoil in the period. The case of Chile drew the attention of both Albert O. Hirschman and Arnold Harberger both of whom published work on Chilean inflation in 1963.

=== 1970s and 1980s ===
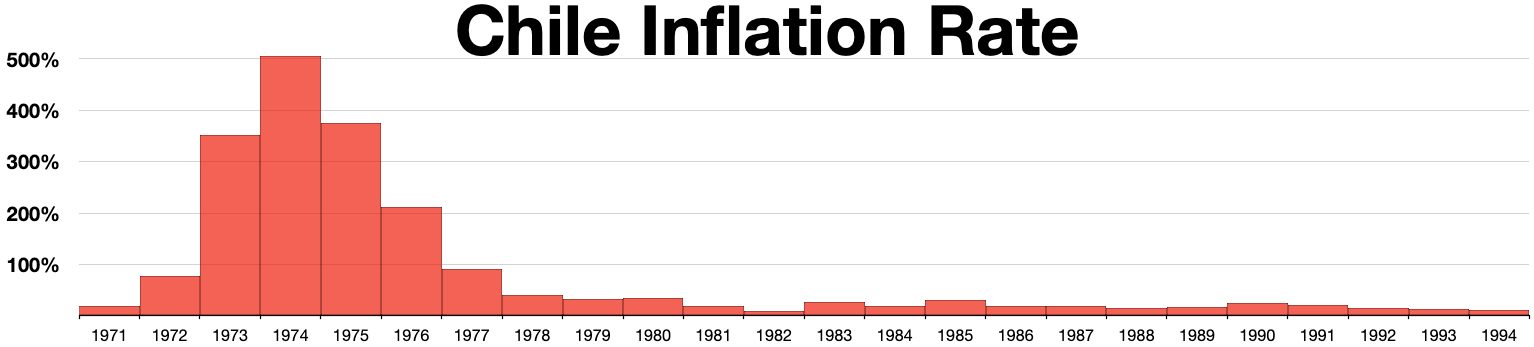
Chile inflation rate 1971-1994

During 1972, the macroeconomic problems of the Allende administration continued to mount. Inflation surpassed 200 percent, and the fiscal deficit surpassed 13 percent of GDP. Domestic credit to the public sector grew at almost 300 percent, and international reserves dipped below US$77 million.

In 1975 Milton Friedman explained the inflation that Pinochet's Chile was experiencing was the result of a government budget deficit. Exchange rates were not a major topic during Friedman's and Arnold Harberger's visit to Chile in 1975. Economists tended to converge on the idea that Chile was not prepared neither for a floating nor a fixed exchange rate.

Following a series of economic reforms implemented from the mid-1970s onward Chile's economy bounced back and boomed. The boom ended in the economic crisis of 1982. The Latin American debt crisis had a devastating impact on every Latin American country, but Chile was hit hardest with a GDP decline of 14%, while Latin American GDP diminished by 3.2% within the same period. Besides the Petrodollar recycling and the 1979 energy crisis there were some specific Chilean reasons for the crises too. The Chicago Boys had expected that since the government had achieved a fiscal surplus and the decision for external borrowing was left to private agents a foreign exchange crisis would not occur. But in an effort to fight inflation Dollarization was introduced which lead to a Peso revaluation that caused high current account deficits which led to an increase in foreign lending. Additionally capital controls were abandoned and the financial market deregulated which led to an undamped increase in private foreign borrowing. The debt crises led to a bank run which led to an economic crises.

=== 1990s and 2000s ===
In the early 1990s Chile pioneered Central Bank independence and a novel counter-cyclical fiscal rule to fight inflation. Inflation decreased during the 1990s so that by 1998 it had come under 10%.

In October 1999 Chile introduced "fully-fledged inflation targeting". According to Pablo García Silva, member of the board of the Central Bank of Chile, this has allowed to attenuate inflation. García Silva exemplifies this with the limited inflation seen in Chile during the 2002 Brazilian general election and the Great Recession of 2008–2009.

=== 2020s ===
Inflation has seen a severe upsurge since the beginning of the COVID-19 pandemic in Chile, during the presidency of Sebastián Piñera, and at the start of Gabriel Boric's term in office.

The impact of the COVID-19 pandemic in Chile unleashed a serious economic crisis. Even though the government offered different relief plans for companies and people, those plans were deemed insufficient and extremely restrictive, excluding several groups of affected people. This increased the distance with the political opposition and even with some members of the governing coalition. Owing to the perceived lack of support for the people affected by the pandemic, a group of left-wing politicians proposed a constitutional reform to allow people to withdraw a 10% of their pension funds without restrictions. While the government rejected the proposal, it echoed with the population and even some right-wing politicians supported the proposal. The proposal was approved by both chambers of the Congress in June 2021 by a supermajority, giving a serious blow to the Piñera administration. A second 10% withdrawal was approved in December and a third one was approved in April 2021. After the third project was approved with bipartisan support, Sebastián Piñera denounced it as unconstitutional and presented it to the Constitutional Court of Chile; however, the Court voted 7 to 3 to approve the constitutional reform, dealing another loss for the president. The shocking defeat in the Court was considered for many as the political end of the Piñera government. According to several polls, the Piñera administration received its lowest level of support, reaching below 10%.

Measured by the change in the Índice de Precios al Consumidor (IPC) in March 2022 relative to March 2021 indicate this inflation rate (1.9%) is the highest known since October 1993. Bread and meat prices increased as well as those of food in general. Cooking oil prices have risen, with a particular brands a Santiago supermarket experiencing a 90% price increase from April 2021 to April 2022. Prices of food and in particular meat are deemed by the Food and Agriculture Organization to have risen as consequence of the 2022 Russian invasion of Ukraine. The item "education" of the IPC also rose significantly (6.6%). Minister of Finance Mario Marcel has argued against laws that would permit further pension fund withawals, claiming these withdrawals will lead to further inflation. By April 2022 the annual inflation rate was of 9,4%, the highest in 13 years. This was higher than similar figures for Colombia (8.53) and Mexico (7.45) but lower than Brazil (11.30). Scholar Jorge Berríos of the University of Chile estimates that a third of the recent inflation in Chile has internal causes, primarily deriving from COVID-19-related economic aid and pension fund withdrawals. The notion that pension fund withdrawals would be contributing significantly to inflation has been questioned by scholar Jaime Casassus of the Pontifical Catholic University of Chile who instead stresses the international aspect of the inflation. The inflation in food prices has been associated with an increasing number of supermarket credit card issued in 2022 as well as increasing rates of supermarket credit card debt default.

In April 2022, President Gabriel Boric announced a $3.7 billion economic recovery plan that included an increase in the minimum wage to help people deal with rising prices.

The poll Data Influye posits there is a dominant view among Chileans that inflation is the main issue that may weaken Boric's government.

== Bibliography ==
- Salazar, Gabriel; Pinto, Julio (2002). Historia contemporánea de Chile III. La economía: mercados empresarios y trabajadores. LOM Ediciones. ISBN 956-282-172-2.
- Villalobos, Sergio; Silva, Osvaldo; Silva, Fernando; Estelle, Patricio (1974). Historia De Chile (14th ed.). Editorial Universitaria. ISBN 956-11-1163-2.
