= 2022 India–Pakistan heat wave =

2022 heat wave in India and Pakistan

Meteorological history
- Date: March - June 2022
- Heat wave
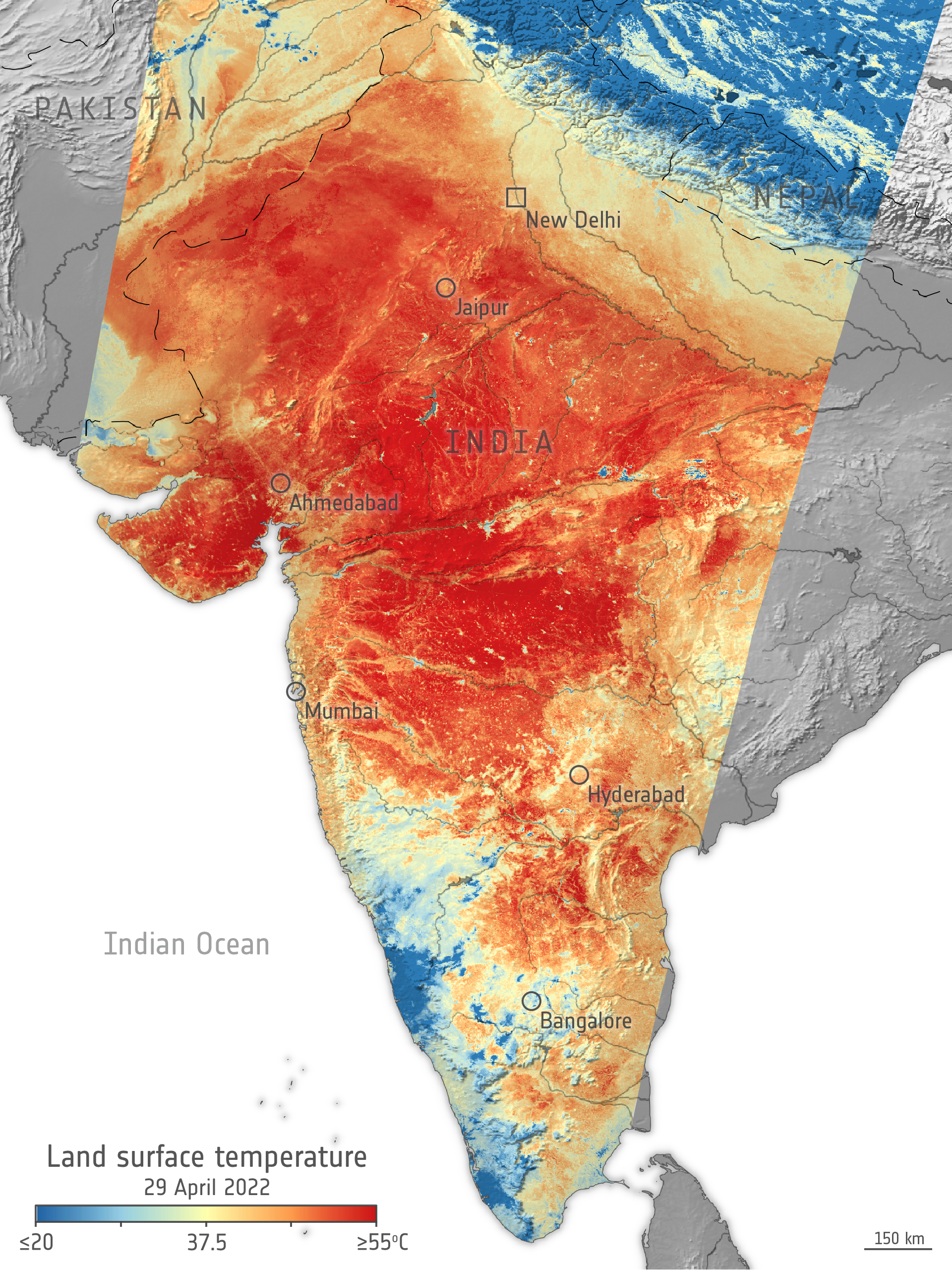

Overall effects
- Fatalities: 90
- Areas affected: India, Pakistan

The 2022 India–Pakistan heat wave was an extreme weather event which resulted in the hottest March in the subcontinent since 1901. The hot season arrived unusually early in the year and extended into April, affecting a large part of India's northwest and Pakistan. The heatwave was combined with a drought, with only a quarter to a third of the normal rainfall. It occurred during a La Niña event, in which heat records are generally less likely.

Several cities across India had high temperatures over 42.8 °C (109.0 °F), with Wardha rising to 45 °C (113 °F). In Pakistan, the city of Nawabshah recorded a high temperature of 49.5 °C (121.1 °F) and Jacobabad and Sibi both reached 47 °C (117 °F). Pakistan's Minister of Climate Change Sherry Rehman described it as a "spring-less year".

== Severity and significance ==
The heat wave broke records for temperature highs in Pakistan and Bangladesh India. The wave has also received attention due to its length.

== Impacts ==
=== Death Toll ===
Estimates have the death toll of the heatwave at around 90 across India and Pakistan, due to the heat itself as well as the poor harvest and a Glacial Lake Outburst Flood.

=== Impact on agriculture ===
During the 2022 food crises, India began taking steps to export more rice and wheat, in part to fill the gaps created by the Russian invasion of Ukraine. However, the heatwave caused increasing local prices and lower supply, issues also exacerbated by the war increasing fertilizer prices. The heatwave occurred mostly during the final weeks of the wheat growing season, killing the plants shortly before harvest.

The heatwave significantly impacted agriculture in India. At the same time early rainfall in India was 71% lower than the norm. In Punjab, the main crop producer in India, 15% of the harvest was lost and in some regions even 30%. The heatwave caused a reverse in policy by Indian government, from trying to import to address the crises, to halting exports.

The heatwave has also severely impacted peach and apple harvests in Balochistan.

=== Nature and the environment ===
The heatwave has resulted in birds falling from the sky in Gujarat.

=== Bridge collapse ===
The Hassanabad Bridge in Hunza Valley, Pakistan collapsed after a glacial lake released large amounts of water into a stream caused by the heatwave.

=== Electricity shortages ===
India faced its worst electricity shortage in more than six years, and demand due to the heat wave strained the electric grid in the country. Scorching temperatures forced early closures of schools and sent people indoors. Rajasthan, Gujarat, and Andhra Pradesh all reduced power allocated to industry due to an increase in power consumption dedicated to cooling.

The high power demand increased demand for coal in India, which is the main source of electricity generation in the country. The state-run enterprise Coal India increased its output by 27%. Indian Railways had to cancel hundreds of passenger trains as an emergency measure to prioritize hauling coal to coal power plants to avoid blackouts. The state also requested that electricity providers imported some 19 million tonnes of coal before the end of June.

On Friday, 29 April 2022, demand for electricity reached 207 gigawatts, an all-time high in India, representing an increase of two gigawatts of demand over the previous day.

== Causes ==
A real-time extreme event attribution study by the World Weather Attribution project showed that the heat wave was made 30 times more likely due to climate change.

The occurrence of the heatwave was consistent with underlying climate change in Pakistan and in India. Indian scientists said that the major proximate cause was "weak western disturbances – storms originating in the Mediterranean region – which meant little pre-monsoon rainfall in north-western and central India".

== See also ==
- Heat waves of 2022
- 2022 South Asian floods
