= Adam Minter =

Journalist and author

Adam Minter is an American journalist and author. He is the Shanghai correspondent for Bloomberg World View.

In 2004, he received the first Stephen Barr Award for individual excellence in business feature writing for a series of investigative pieces on the emerging recycling industries in China for Scrap Magazine and, later, Recycling International.

== Books ==
- Secondhand: Travels in the New Global Garage Sale (Bloomsbury Publishing, 2019)
- Junkyard Planet: Travels in the Billion-Dollar Trash Trade (Bloomsbury Publishing, 2013)
