= Climate change in Pakistan =

Emissions, impacts and responses of Pakistan related to climate change

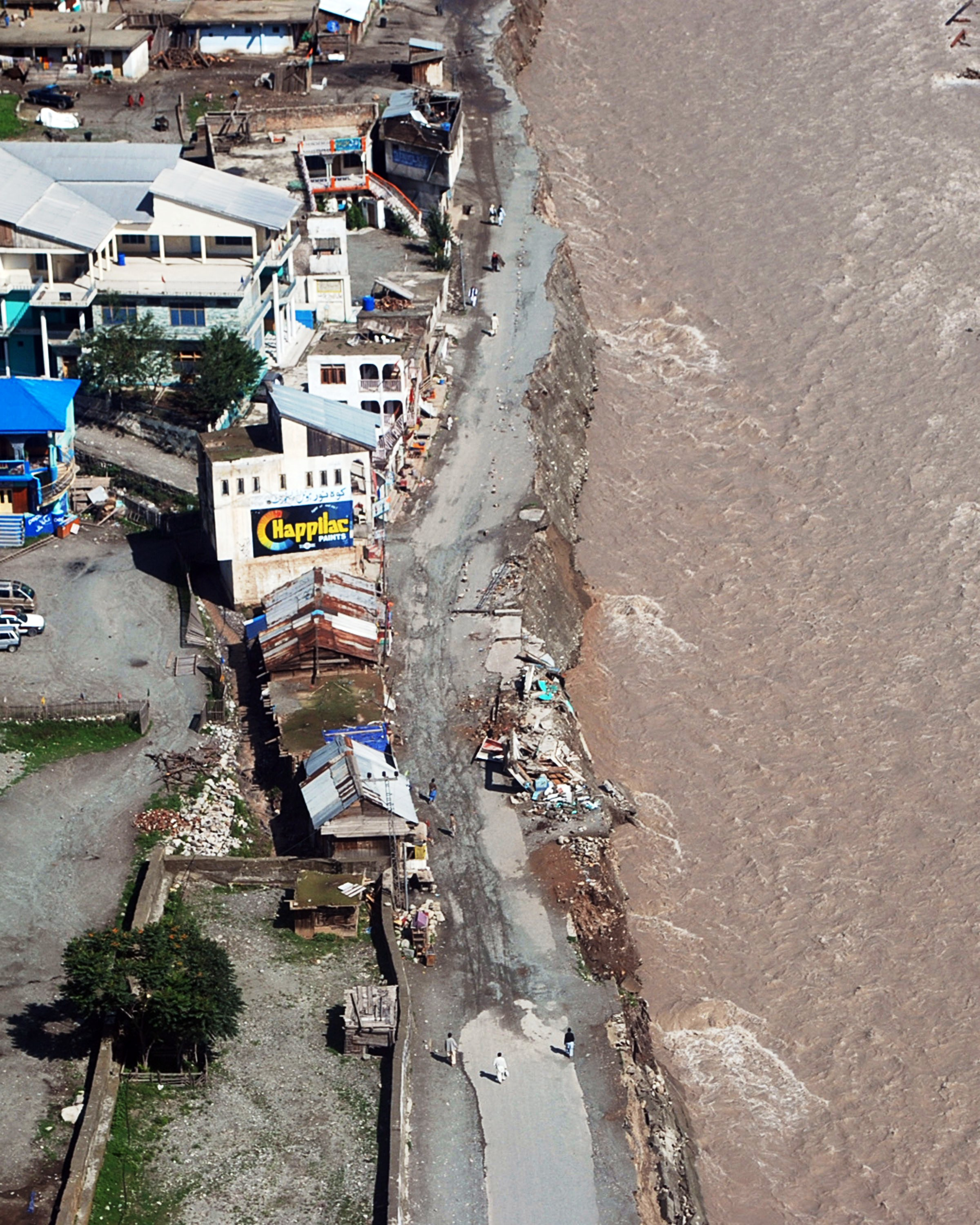
Climate change may have been a contributing factor to the severity of the 2010 Pakistan floods.

Pakistan is highly vulnerable to climate change. As with the changing climate in South Asia as a whole, the climate of Pakistan has changed over the past several decades, with significant impacts on the environment and people. In addition to increased heat, drought and extreme weather in parts of the country, the melting of glaciers in the Himalayas has impacted some of the important rivers of Pakistan. Between 1999 and 2018, Pakistan ranked 5th in the countries affected by extreme weather events caused by climate change.

As Pakistan's largest province, Punjab has demonstrated its commitment to addressing climate change challenges through initiatives such as the Climate Change Activity Plan and the Punjab Climate Change Strategy.

Pakistan is prone to a range of natural disasters, including cyclones, floods, drought, intense rainfall, and earthquakes. According to scientific research, climate change played a substantial role in the devastating 2022 floods, which directly affected over 30 million people in Pakistan, causing loss of life, damage to public infrastructure, and widespread displacement. Climate change poses a significant menace to Pakistan's economy and security.

== Greenhouse gas emissions ==
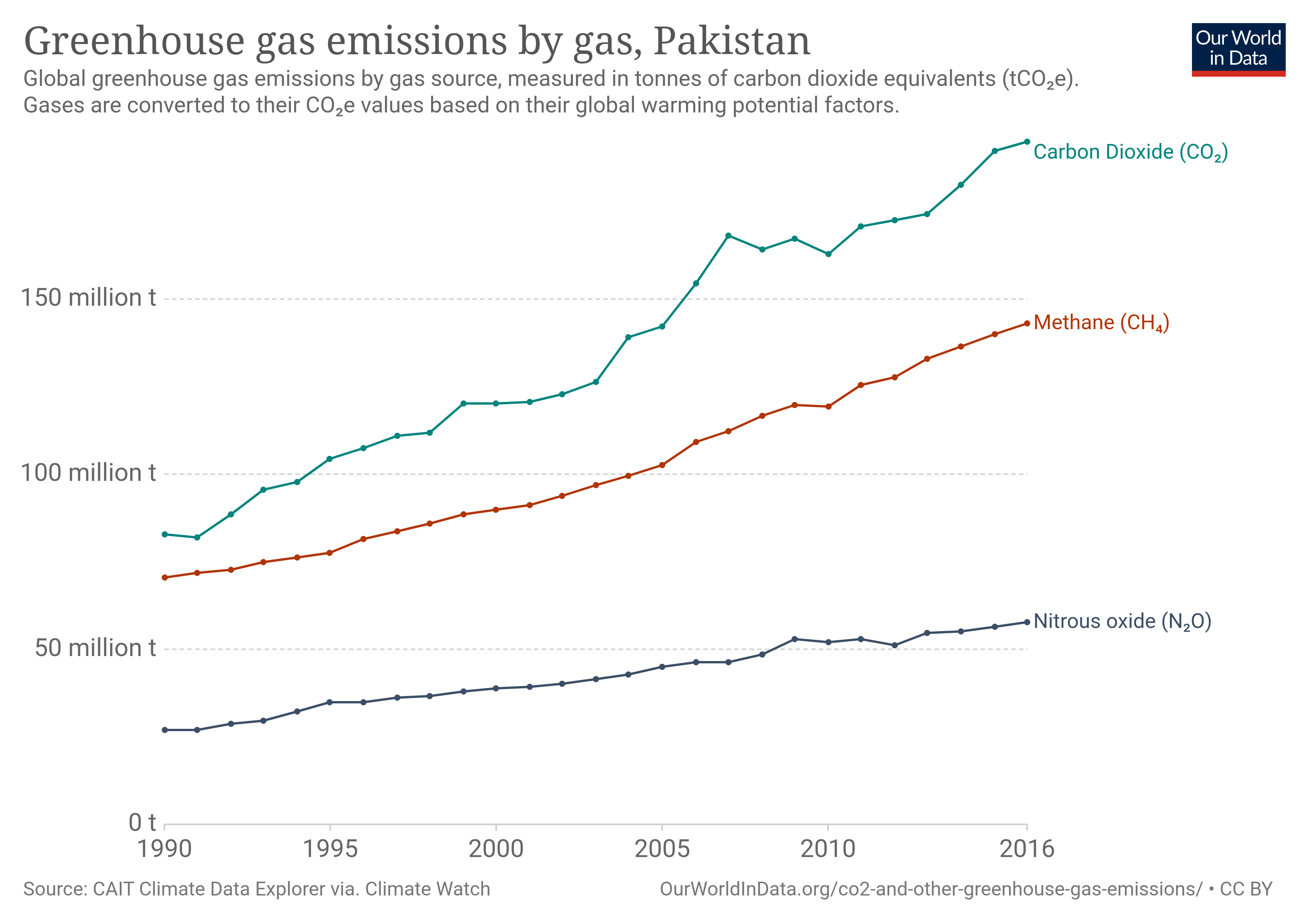
Pakistan greenhouse gas emissions 1990–2016

Pakistan's greenhouse gas (GHG) emissions are less than 1% of the world total, and GHG emissions per person, at 2 tonnes per year, are less than half the global average. In 2015 GHG emissions totalled 408 million tonnes of CO_{2eq}; of which 43% was from agriculture in Pakistan; and 46% from energy in Pakistan, such as burning fuel for heat, to power transport, and generate electricity.

Agricultural GHG are mostly methane and nitrous oxide. Methane comes from belching cattle, sheep and goats; manure management; and rice cultivation. Nitrous oxide is mainly from agricultural soils due to the application of synthetic fertilizers, farmyard manure, and crop residue mixes after burning.

Energy GHG is mostly carbon dioxide: in 2019 burning fossil gas, coal and oil each emitted around 80 million tonnes. Sakib Sherani, a former economic advisor to the Prime Minister of Pakistan, argued in 2021 that stricter measures against air pollution in Pakistan might include actions that would also limit GHG emissions, such as increasing tax on motor fuels. In 2020 Prime Minister Imran Khan said that no more coal-fired power stations in Pakistan would be given permits. However coal-fired power stations which have already been given permits are expected to be constructed.

As of 2021, Pakistan has not declared a net-zero year goal, however, it has committed to cut 50% of projected emissions by 2030. In 2022 Prime Minister Muhammad Shehbaz Sharif said that more solar, wind and hydropower should be built to reduce the fossil fuel import bill.

An economic crisis has significantly impaired the economic rights of individuals, depriving them of necessary resources and opportunities. Moreover, the effects of climate change have intensified heatwaves, leading to catastrophic floods that was reported that it claims the lives of more than 1,100 and 33 million were affected. Nearly 750,000 people were left without access to safe and adequate housing, education or health infrastructure. A prevailing sentiment of injustice permeates the nation as Pakistan, despite contributing less than 1% of global greenhouse gases, finds itself disproportionately vulnerable to the impacts of climate change due to its geographical circumstances.

== Impacts on the natural environment ==
=== Temperature and weather changes ===
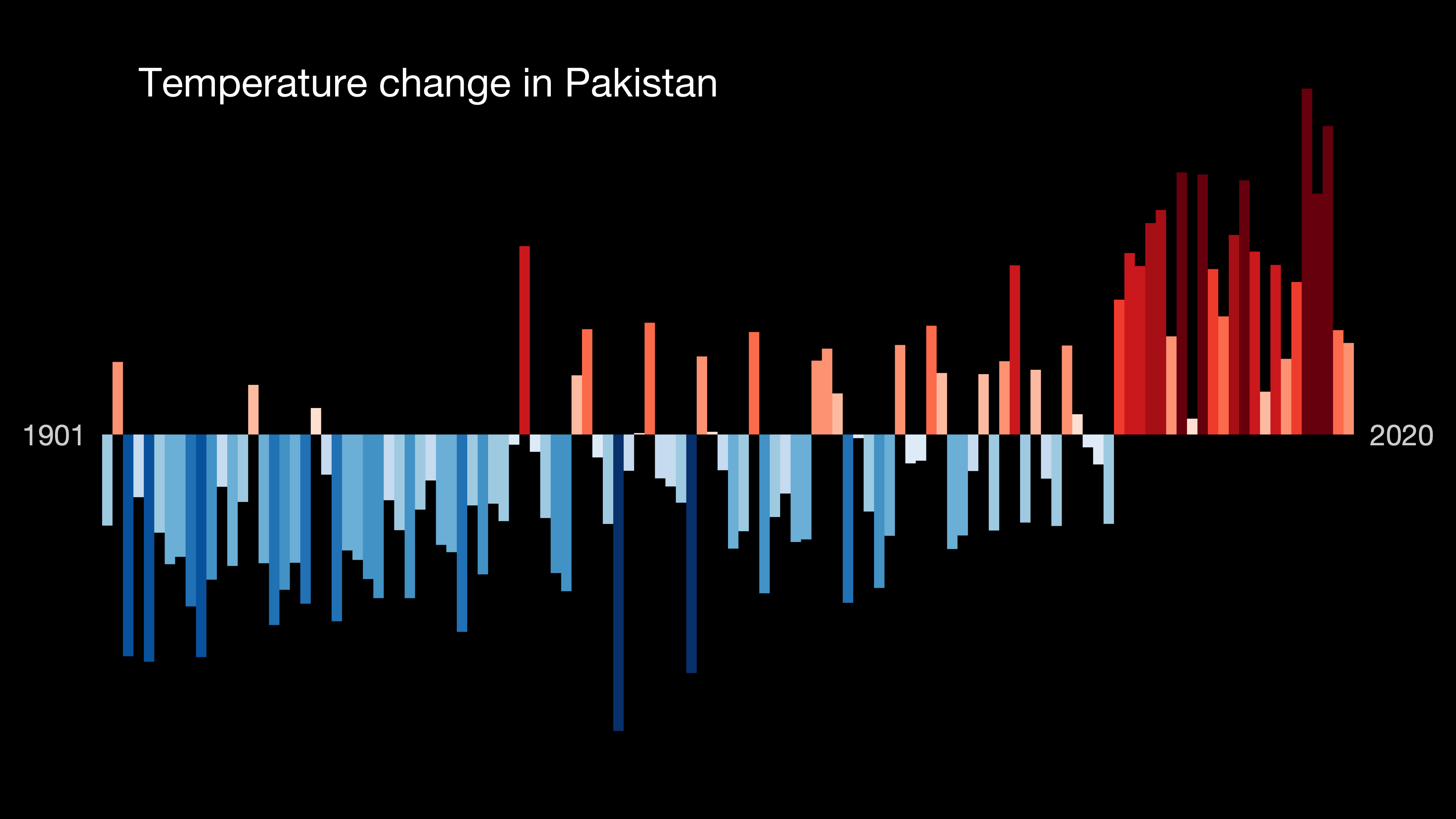
Temperature anomaly in Pakistan between 1901 and 2020.

Köppen climate classification map for Pakistan for 1980–2016

2071–2100 map under the most intense climate change scenario. Mid-range scenarios are currently considered more likely

While the effects of climate change are highly region-specific, it can be said that mean surface temperatures are rising and extreme weather events will increase over time. These changes will disrupt expected environmental processes and human activity. The factors thought to affect climate change can exhibit variability too. Chaotic and periodic variations have been observed over different regions of the Earth and varying spans of time.

In May 2022, a severe heatwave was recorded in Pakistan and India. The temperature reached 51 °C. Climate change makes such heatwaves 100 times more likely. Without climate change heatwaves, more severe that those who occurred in 2010 are expected to arrive 1 time in 312 years. Now they are expected to occur every 3 years.

The climate change projections of the IPCC Sixth Assessment Report for South Asia as a whole suggest that heatwaves and humid heat stress will be more intense and frequent; and that both annual and summer monsoon rainfall will increase, with more variation by year. Consequently, this will significantly impact the productivity and efficiency of water-dependent sectors such as agriculture and energy.

General future projections for Pakistan's climate are:

- Pakistan’s projected temperature increase is expected to be higher than the global average.
- Projected temperature increase in northern parts is expected to be higher than the southern parts of the country.
- The frequency of hot days and hot nights is expected to increase significantly.
- Pakistan’s rainfall projections indicate an increasing trend nationwide.
- An increasing trend in the rainfall over the Upper Indus Basin and a massively increasing trend in the Lower Indus Basin.

==== Extreme weather events ====
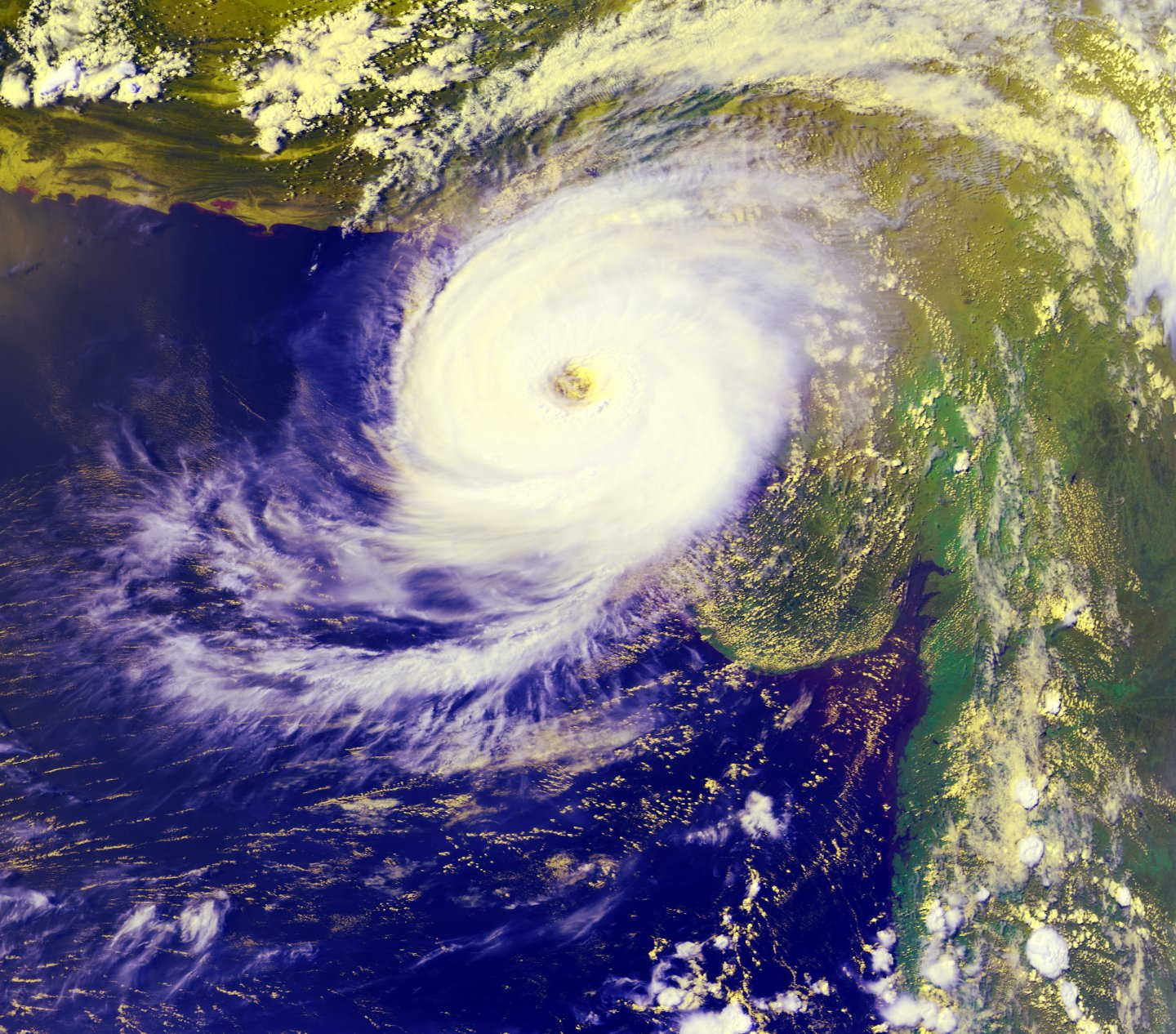
Cyclone 2A making landfall near Karachi.

Extreme weather, such as cyclones or intense monsoons are likely to increase in Pakistan because of increased sea and atmospheric temperature. Government projections, highlight considerable increase in the frequency and intensity of extreme weather events, coupled with erratic monsoon rains causing frequent and intense floods and droughts. For example, between 1998 and 2018 Pakistan reported more than 150 extreme weather events.

In 2022 catastrophic floods hit the country. The main causes were increased precipitation and glaciers melting fueled by climate change. One third of the country was under water. According to Climate minister Sherry Rehman this "has exceeded every boundary, every norm we've seen in the past". 33 million people were affected.

=== Sea level rise ===
Sea level rise along the Karachi coast is estimated at 1.1 mm per year (mm/year) for the period 1856–2000 according to the National Institute of Oceanography, Pakistan. According to IPCC estimates, the mean rate of global average sea level rise was 1.7 mm/year between 1901 and 2010, and 3.2 mm/year between 1993 and 2010. This change in sea level is thought to be due to two major processes, the thermal expansion of the oceans and the melting of glacier mass.

It is difficult to predict SLR for the entire region of Pakistan since data is limited at the country level. While IPCC estimates predict a global mean SLR of 0.2–0.6 m by 2100, a rise of 0.7 m is predicted for the region of South Asia (which includes the Pakistan coast). This SLR will most likely affect low-lying coastal areas south of Karachi toward Keti Bander and Indus River delta more than other regions of Pakistan.

The impact of SLR on coastal areas and its resources may already be evident in the inundation of low-lying areas, degradation of mangrove forests, declining drinking water quality, and decrease in fish and shrimp productivity in those regions. The vulnerability of the Sindh coastal zone is considered higher than the Balochistan coastal areas because of the former's flat tidal topography and higher population concentration with industrial activity along coastal areas (such as Karachi). This rise in sea level is also expected to increase the rate of soil erosion along the coastal belt. An 80% reduction in the amount of river sediment as compared to the early 20th century is reported and attributed to the extensive damming of the Indus River. The delta undergoes a natural subsidence process that ranges from a "sinking" of less than 1 mm/year to more than 10 mm/year. This rate is exceeded due to groundwater and petroleum extraction. Thus, the erosion, subsidence and lack of sedimentation are resulting in the shrinking and sinking of the Indus River delta.

According to an NGO head, 3 million acres of land containing many villages have been submerged in the coastal areas of the districts Thatta, Badin and Sajawal over the past 40 years. This loss of has resulted in the migration of over 1 million people from these districts to urban centers like Karachi. They further claimed that the construction of dams and diversion of river water have worsened the situation.

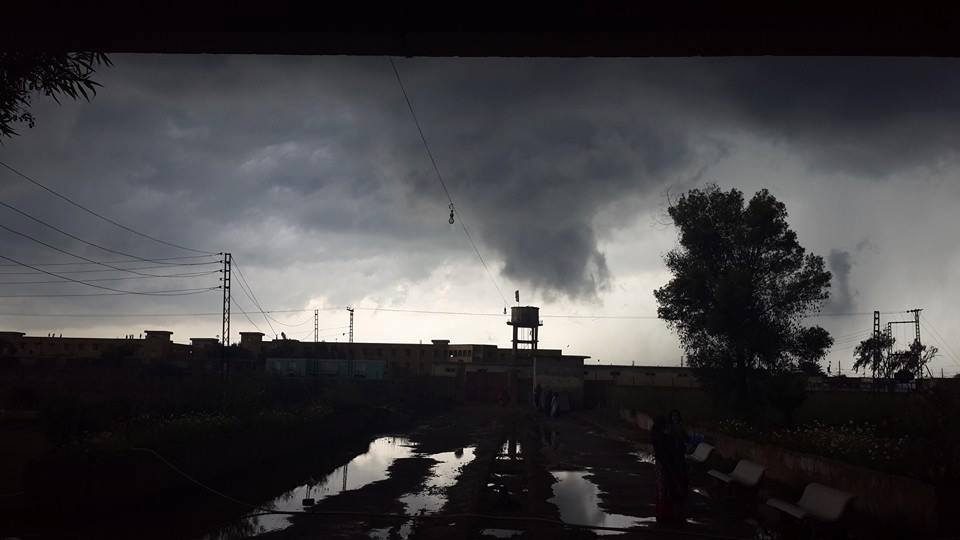
Supercell Larkana, March 2015

=== Water resources ===
Water availability per capita is projected to decrease.

=== Glacier retreat ===
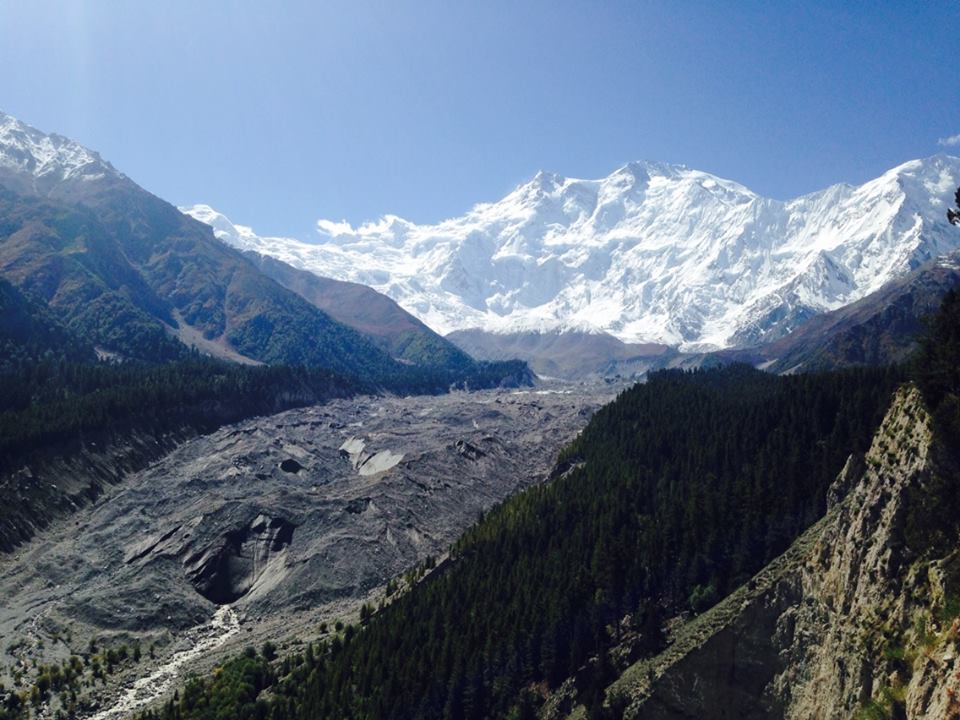
Glacial retreat in Nanga Parbat, Gilgit-Baltistan.

Glacial retreat in parts of the Himalayas poses risks of meltwater flooding. In 2020, melting of a glacier in Shispare led to evacuations of the village of Hassanabad, Hunza. A 2014 remote sensing study suggested the situation of glaciers in Pakistan varies between regions of the country. The devastating 2022 floods were in part driven by glaciers melting.

== Impacts on people ==
=== Economic impacts ===
The poverty rate of Pakistan, when estimated at $2 per day purchasing power parity, exceeds 50% of the total population with stark provincial disparities. This high prevalence of poverty, coupled with the lack of and access to resources, places the country in the low human development category, ranked 146 out of 187 countries, well below the average human development index value compared to other South Asian countries.

The Intergovernmental Panel on Climate Change (IPCC) Fifth Assessment Report (AR5) for the Asia region noted that the sensitivity of agriculture-dependent economies (such as Pakistan) toward climate change arises from their distinct geography, demographic trends, socioeconomic factors, and lack of adaptive capacity that when taken together, determine the climate change vulnerability profile of the country. Pakistan is frequently plagued by heatwaves, droughts, river and flash floods, landslides, and storms, including cyclones. The impact of climate change has the potential to initiate extensive and potent negative feedback loops that affect both livelihoods and public health. Consequently, this contributes to Pakistan's ongoing struggle with poverty. Paired with the surging inflation and the ongoing political turbulence in the country, this situation has the potential to create a catastrophic scenario. These concurrent trends serve as possible factors that may drive climate-induced migration from rural regions to urban hubs as people in Pakistan search for employment and more stable living conditions.

==== Agriculture ====
Future projections for Pakistan are that major crop yields such as of wheat and rice are expected to decrease significantly.

According to research led by Dr. Adil Najam at the Lahore University of Management Sciences, by 2040 the cost of climate change to agriculture in Pakistan is likely to be up to 7% of productivity but that good climate adaptation practices could result in a net productivity gain of up to 40%.

The 2022 Pakistan floods mainly caused by increased precipitation and glaciers melting fueled by climate change, destroyed around 50% of the crops of Pakistan which can lead to food shortages.

In 2024, it was reported that Pakistan has faced an orange shortage due to climate change, which has reduced citrus production by 35%, slashed exports, and led to the closure of processing factories.

=== Migration ===
Due to extreme weather and uncertain economic outcomes, rural communities in Pakistan have been displaced in large numbers to major cities. Experts expect 20% of the population to move to major cities; current migration patterns included 700,000 people a year moving from rural to urban environments. Larger estimates, including major displacements because of extreme weather, suggest as many as 20 million migrants from rural to urban communities since 2010.

== Mitigation and adaptation ==
=== Mitigation ===
The most important targets for mitigation efforts focused on reduction of GHG emissions are the energy and agriculture sectors. In the energy sector, integration of climate change and energy policy objectives is particularly important as today's investment such as in the Thar coalfield will "lock in" the infrastructure, fuel and technologies to be used for decades to come. Similarly, the building and transport infrastructure put in place today should meet the design needs of the future. Therefore, energy efficiency requirements in building codes and long-term transport planning will prove important.

=== Policies and legislation ===
The National Climate Change Policy (NCCP) of 2012, framed by the Government of Pakistan as the guiding policy document for the country on climate change, acknowledges the growing risk of future extreme natural hazards due to climate change. It further provides a picture of the vulnerabilities faced by individual sectors, ecological regions and socioeconomic classes. The major climate change threats identified in the report include:

1. Considerable increase in the frequency and intensity of extreme weather events.
2. Increased siltation of major dams caused by more frequent and intense floods;
3. Rising temperatures resulting in enhanced heat and water-stressed conditions, particularly in arid and semi-arid regions, leading to reduced agricultural productivity;
4. Further decrease in the already scanty forest cover, from too rapid change in climatic conditions to allow natural migration of adversely affected plant species;
5. Increased intrusion of saline water in the Indus delta, adversely affecting coastal agriculture, mangroves and the breeding grounds of fish;
6. Threat to coastal areas due to projected sea level rise and increased cyclonic activity due to higher sea surface temperatures;
7. Increased stress between upper riparian and lower riparian regions in relation to sharing of water resources;
8. Increased health risks and climate change induced migration.

==== Ministry of Climate Change ====
Various programs focused on adaptation and mitigation have been developed within the Pakistani government. Since 2017, a cabinet-level ministry has led much of that capacity.

The Ministry of Climate Change and Environmental Coordination Urdu: وزارت موسمیاتی تبدیلی و ماحولیاتی ہم آہنگی, is a Cabinet-level ministry of the Government of Pakistan concerned with climate change in Pakistan. Senator Musadik Masood Malik is in charge of the ministry with the status of a Federal Minister.

==== Reforestation ====
Pakistan has less than 6% total forest area. This, combined with climate change, exacerbates challenges such as flooding, heat waves, and soil loss. Starting in 2014, the government started pursuing a Billion Tree Tsunami policy, and in 2018 that policy was extended to a 10 billion tree, Plant for Pakistan program. During the COVID-19 pandemic in Pakistan, government agencies continued their reforestation program, creating 60,000 jobs among the unemployed.

==== Litigation ====
In Pakistan in 2015 Lahore High Court ruled in Asghar Leghari vs. Federation of Pakistan that the government was violating the National Climate Change Policy of 2012 and the Framework for Implementation of Climate Change Policy (2014–2030) by failing to meet goals set by the policies. In response, a Climate Change Commission was required to be formed in order to help Pakistan meet its climate goals. The case is considered significant in the history of human rights-based climate litigation.

== Society and culture ==
=== Public opinion ===
According to the BBC Climate Asia report, the majority of the Pakistani people surveyed claimed that climate change has heavily impacted their lives in the form of floods and droughts, and most importantly has affected the availability of resources such as energy and water. 53% of Pakistanis felt that their lives had become worse off than they were five years ago. Although the effects of climate change are evident, the survey found that the majority of the people were unaware of the meaning of climate change, and "ascribed changes in climate and extreme weather events to the will of God."

== See also ==
- Plug-in electric vehicles in Pakistan
- 2022 Pakistan floods
