= FAO Food Price Index =

Economic index

The FAO Food Price Index (1961–2025). The average for 2014–2016 is set at 100. Real Nominal

The FAO Food Price Index (FFPI) is a food price index by the Food and Agriculture Organization (FAO) of the United Nations. It records the development of world market prices of 24 agricultural commodities and foodstuffs from five major food commodity groups. The FFPI is considered an indicator of future inflation and cost trends in the food industry.

== Concept ==
The trade-weighted FAO Food Price Index is technically a price index and is calculated using the Laspeyres formula. It documents the development of world market prices of 24 agricultural commodities and foodstuffs in U.S. dollars. Foodstuffs have been grouped by the Food and Agriculture Organization (FAO) of the United Nations into five commodity groups (meat, dairy products, cereals, oils and fats, and sugar).

When calculating the price index according to Étienne Laspeyres, the weights chosen (i.e., the quantities consumed) come from the base year. The reference period from 2014 to 2016 (index value 100) serves as the basis. The index determines the price of the commodity groups in the composition of the base year at goods prices of the reference year in relation to the price of the same commodity groups (same consumption quantities) at goods prices of the base year. From all the data, FAO calculates five sub-indices, which together make up the overall index.

The FAO Food Price Index is published on the first Thursday of every month.

== Composition ==
The monthly FAO Food Price Index (1990–2026) in real (solid lines) vs nominal (dotted lines) terms. The average for 2014–2016 is set at 100. Food Price Index Meat Dairy Cereals Oils Sugar

The overall index consists of the following five sub-indices:

- Meat Price Index (price index for meat)
- Dairy Price Index (price index for dairy products)
- Cereals Price Index (price index for cereals)
- Oils Price Index (price index for oils and fats)
- Sugar Price Index (price index for sugar)

== Historical development ==
The table shows the development of the FAO Food Price Index since 1990.

Food Price Index (2014 to 2016=100)
Date	Nominal	Real
1990	63.3	76.6
1991	62.3	76.1
1992	64.2	77.0
1993	62.3	72.2
1994	67.3	80.4
1995	76.8	83.6
1996	77.8	86.3
1997	70.8	82.4
1998	64.8	78.9
1999	55.4	68.8
2000	53.7	67.5
2001	55.4	72.3
2002	53.4	70.6
2003	58.1	73.0
2004	65.9	77.5
2005	67.6	77.2
2006	72.9	81.1
2007	94.6	99.1
2008	117.7	114.5
2009	91.8	95.2
2010	106.9	106.9
2011	131.8	118.7
2012	122.8	111.4
2013	120.1	109.5
2014	115.0	106.3
2015	93.1	95.1
2016	92.0	97.8
2017	97.9	100.7
2018	95.8	94.1
2019	94.9	95.5
2020	98.1	100.2
2021	125.7	115.0
2022	144.5	123.1
2023	124.5	109.2
2024	122.0	106.0
2025	127.2	109.6

== See also ==
- Food prices
- Price index
