= Juan Manuel Pino Forero =

Panamanian politician (born 1969)

Juan Pino
- Born: Juan Manuel Pino Forero; March 3, 1969 (age 57); Santiago de Veraguas, Veraguas, Panama
- Education: Venezuela Military Academy of the Bolivarian Navy

Juan Manuel Pino Forero (born in Santiago de Veraguas, 3 November 1969) was the minister of public security of Panama.
