= Índice de Precios al Consumidor =

Índice de Precios al Consumidor (IPC) is the consumer price index calculated by the National Statistics Institute (INE) of Chile. It is a measure of the cost of living in Chile. The INE holds contacts journalists by phone the first week of each month to let them know the IPC of the last month.
