= List of bridges in Ghana =

== Historical or architectural interest bridges ==
	Name	Distinction	Length	Type	Carries Crosses	Opened	Location	Province	Ref.
1	Kakum Canopy Walk	7 bridges along 330m trail Height : 40 m (130 ft)		Suspension; Steel	Footbridge; Canopy walkway in Kakum National Park	1995	Cape Coast	Central Region	

== Major bridges ==
	Name	Span	Length	Type	Carries Crosses	Opened	Location	Province	Ref.
1	Adomi Bridge	245 m (804 ft)	337 m (1,106 ft)	Arch; Steel tied-arch	Tema-Jasikan Road; Volta River	1957	Atimpoku; 6°14′21.8″N 0°5′44.3″E	Eastern Region	

== See also ==
- Transport in Ghana
- Ghana Road Network
- Rail transport in Ghana
- Geography of Ghana
- List of rivers of Ghana
