= Senchi =

Senchi Ntonso
- Urban area
- Location within Ghana
- Coordinates: 6°13′16″N 0°05′13″E
- Country: Ghana
- Region: Eastern Region
- District: Asuogyaman District
- Time zone: GMT
  - Summer (DST): GMT

Senchi is a town in the Asuogyaman District of the Eastern Region of Ghana.

== Location ==
Senchi is situated along the west banks of the Volta River, downstream from the Akosombo Dam.

== Notability ==
=== Senchi ferry ===
Senchi has a ferry station used for the crossing of the Volta River from the west to the Old Akrade on the eastern side. It was the major crossing for vehicular traffic prior to the completion of the construction of the Adomi Bridge in January 1957. In 2014, it experienced very heavy traffic while the Adomi Bridge was closed to traffic for repairs.

=== Resorts ===
Senchi is well noted as the location of some resorts and guest houses south of the dam on the Volta River. These include Royal Senchi Resort and The Senchi Consensus
