= Akosombo Port =

Port in Ghana

Coordinates: 06°18′00″N 00°03′00″E

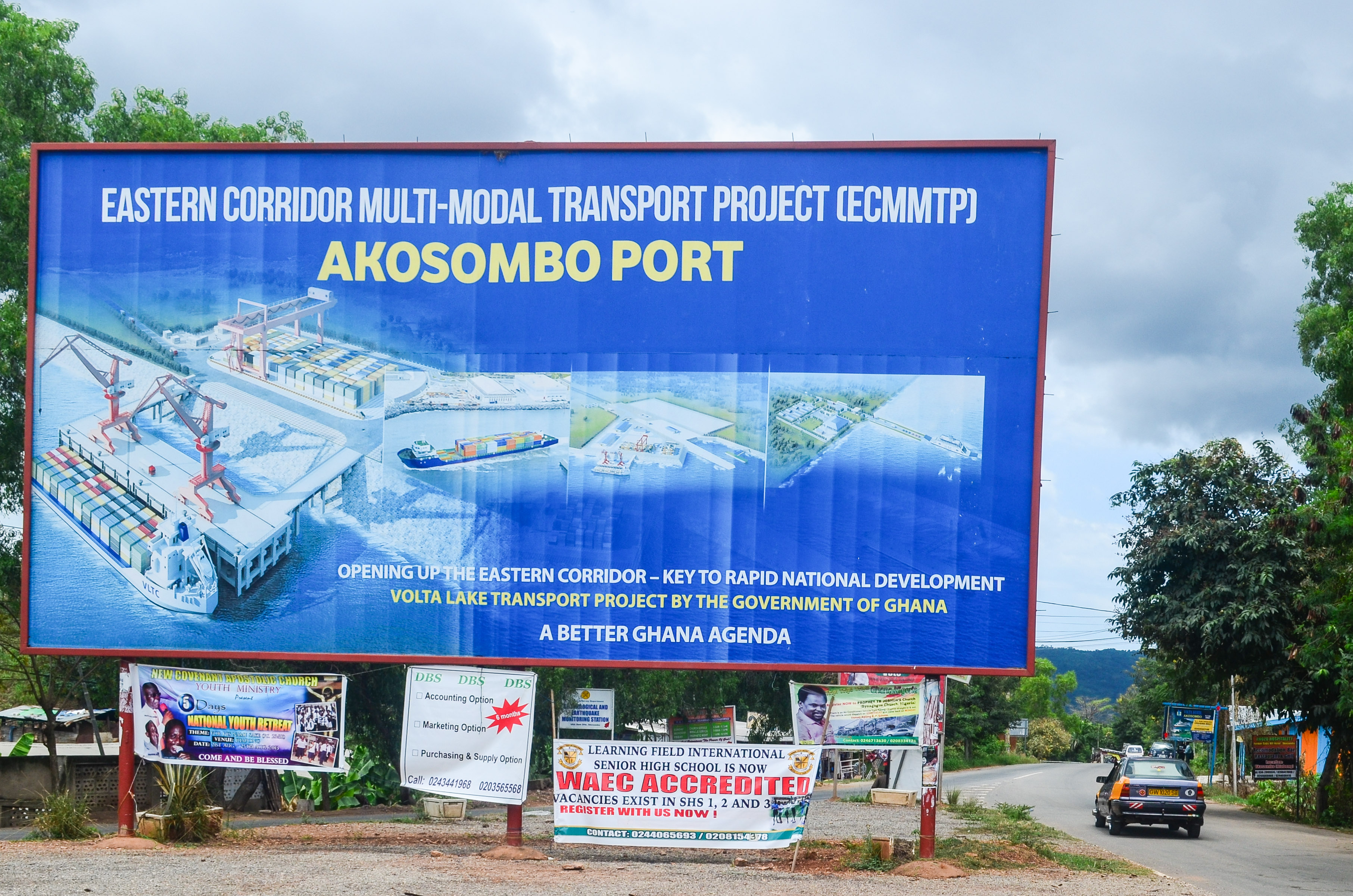
Akosombo Port's signage.

The Akosombo Port is a port on Lake Volta. It is located near the Akosombo Dam at Akosombo.

== See also ==
- Boankra Inland Port
- Takoradi Harbour
- Tema Harbour
