= Akosombo-Tema Highway =

Road in Ghana

Akosombo-Tema Highway is the major highway that joins the industrial and port city of Tema to electricity generating town of Akosombo. The highway connects three regions of Ghana, the Greater Accra Region, the Eastern Region and the Volta Region.
