= St. Barbara Catholic Church =

Saint Barbara Catholic Church
- Santa Barbara "Church" (Italian)
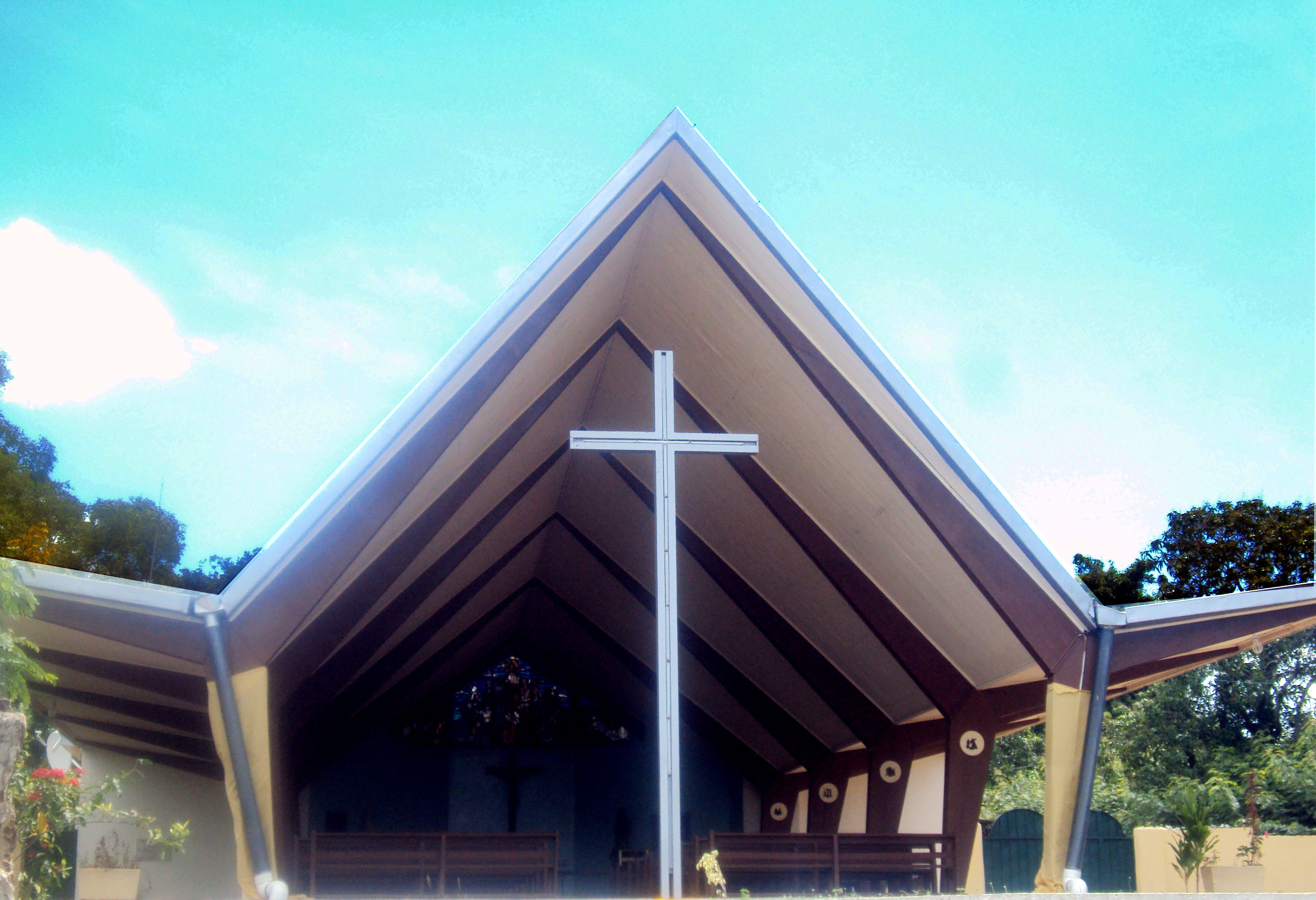
- Saint Barbara Catholic Church captured from the frontage
- Interactive map of Saint Barbara Catholic Church
- 6°18′0″N 0°3′0″E
- Type: Catholic church
- Location: Akosombo, Eastern Region, Ghana

History
- Built: 1962

Saint Barbara Catholic Church, also known as Santa Barbara Catholic Church and Akosombo Catholic Church, is a small church situated at one of the highest points in Akosombo, Ghana, overlooking the Akosombo Dam. It was constructed in September 1962 by Impregilo SPA in 21 days. It was built as a place of worship by the staff of Impregilo during the building of the dam. Subsequently, a memorial plaque was placed in the church to honor the 28 staff of Impregilo SPA who died building the dam.

== Origin and inspiration ==
The church was named after and dedicated to Saint Barbara, the patron saint of the contractors who built the dam and the church. The Church was built to provide a worshipping place and also host the then Archbishop of Milan, Giovanni Battista Montini, who later became Pope Paul VI. He was visiting Ghana that year.

The church, which was completed in 21 days, was designed to resemble praying hands.

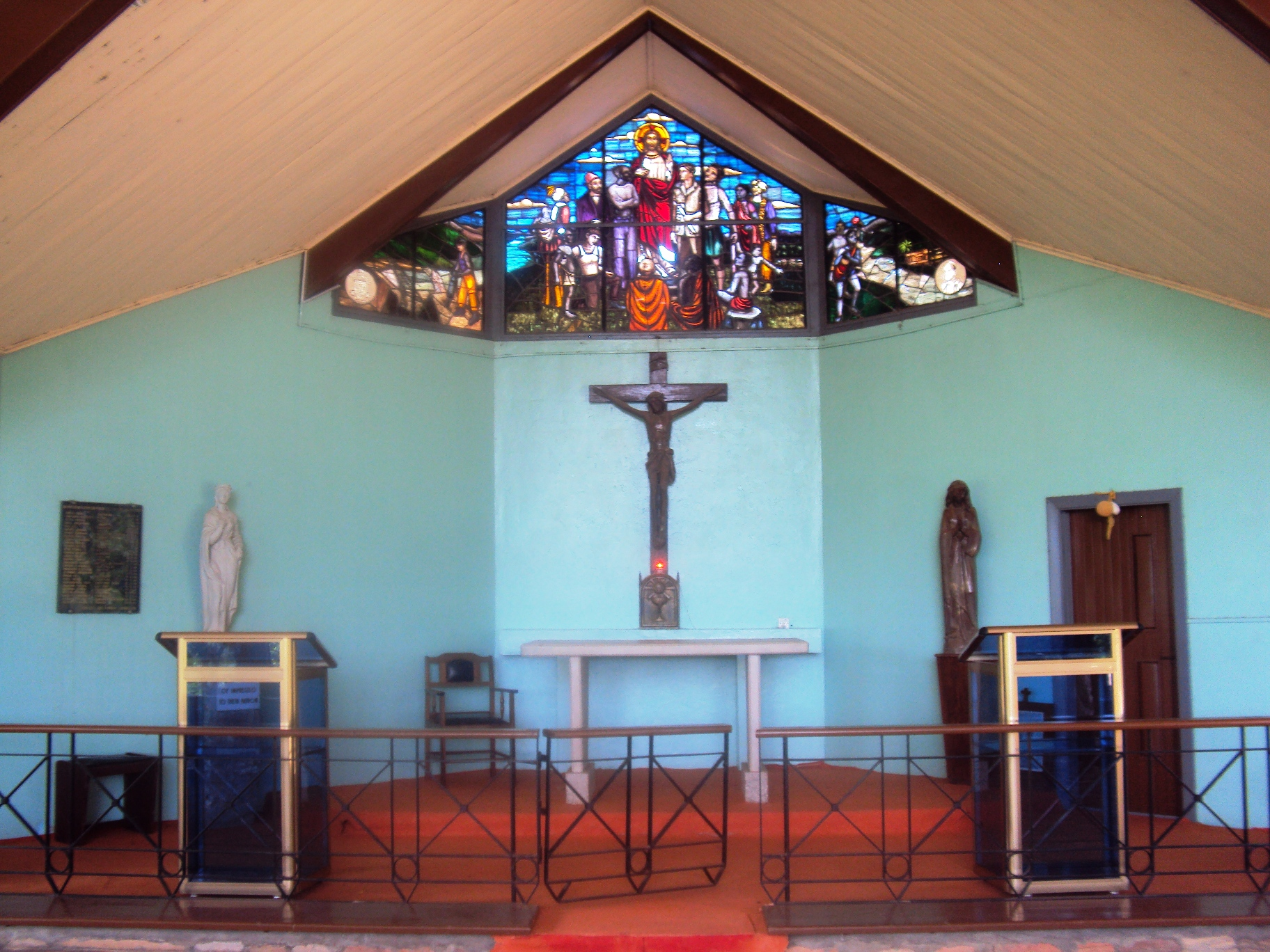
The church's interior

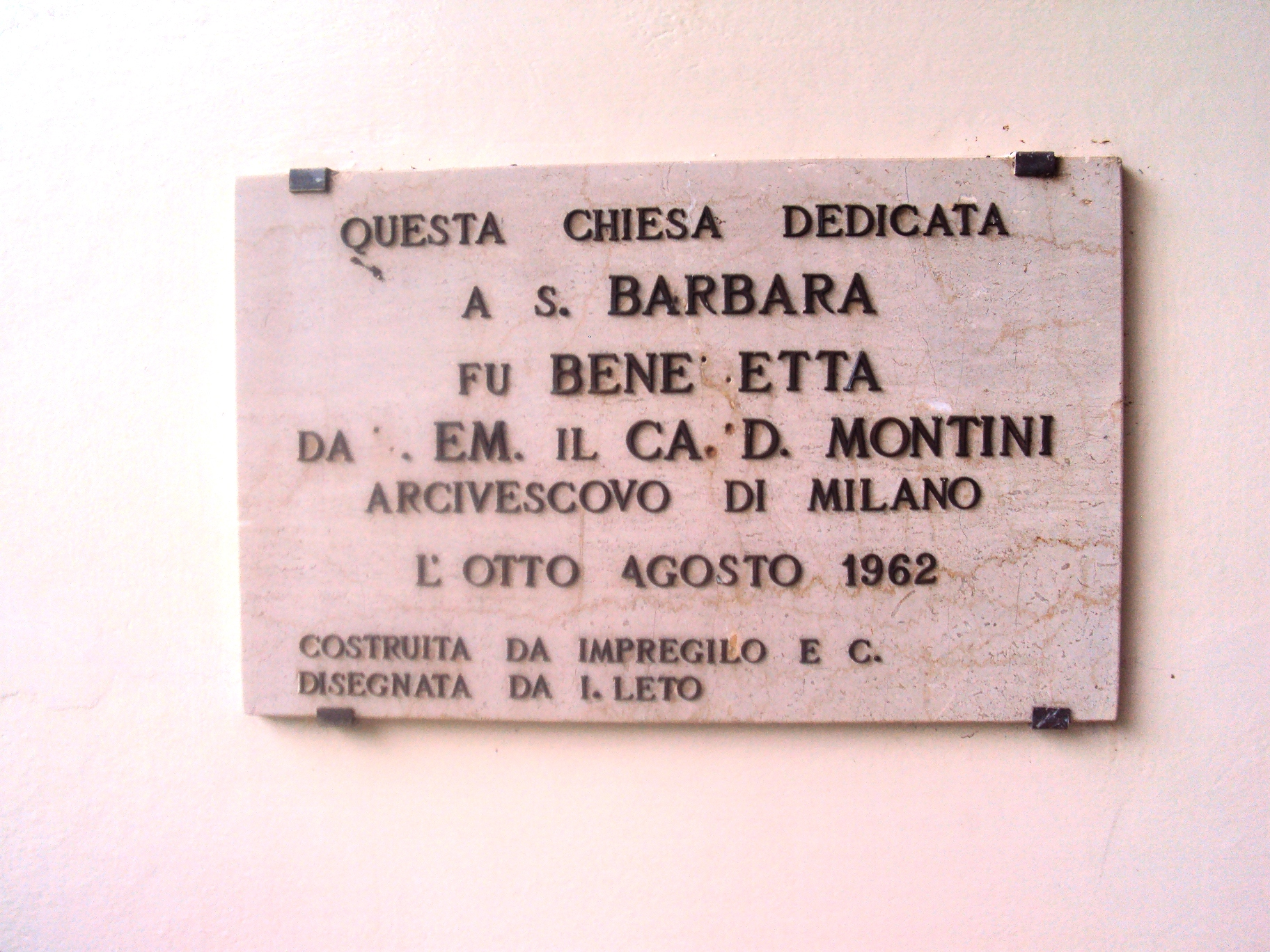
The commemorative plaque on a wall at St Barbara Church

== Akosombo Dam memorial ==
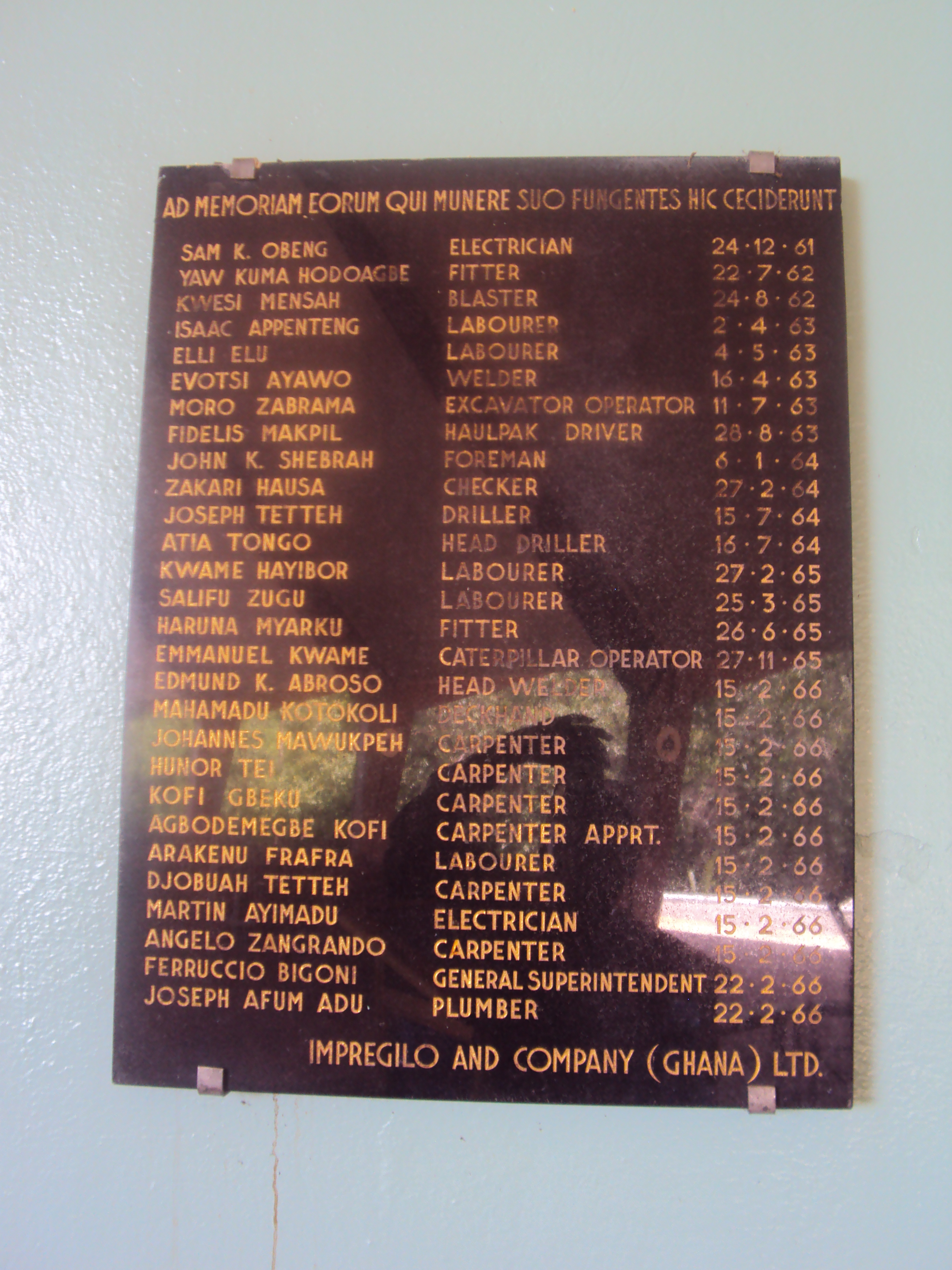
This is a memorial plaque in the St. Barbara church in memory of 28 staff of Impregilo SPA that died building the Akosombo Dam.

A memorial plaque sits in the church in memory of 28 staff of Impregilo SPA that died building the Akosombo Dam, 12 of whom died in an explosion.

Victims of February 15, 1966 explosion

On the February 15th 1966 at 7:15am, there was an explosion at the Akosombo Dam's site. It was suspected that a heavy and unexpected build-up of methane gas or natural gas within one of the tunnels in the dam caused the explosion. The gas was possibly ignited by the lighting of a welding torch. 18 people were in the tunnel at the time of the explosion. 12 died from shock from burns.

Heroes of Akosombo

Victim Name	Position	Date of death	Nationality
Sam K.Obeng	Electrician	24/12/1961	Ghanaian
Yaw Kuma Hodoagbe	Fitter	22/7/1962	Ghanaian
Kwesi Mensah	Blaster	24/8/1962	Ghanaian
Isaac Appenteng	Labourer	2/4/1962	Ghanaian
Elli Elu	Labourer	4/5/1963	Ghanaian
Evotsi Ayawo	Welder	16/4/1963	Ghanaian
Moro Zabrama	Excavator Operator	11/7/1963	
Fidelis Makpil	Haulpak Driver	28/8/1963	Ghanaian
John K. Shebrah	Foreman	6/1/1964	Ghanaian
Zakari Hausa	Checker	27/2/1964	Ghanaian
Joseph Tetteh	Driller	15/7/1964	Ghanaian
Atia Tongo	Head Driller	16/7/1964	Ghanaian
Kwame Hayibor	Labourer	27/7/1965	Ghanaian
Salifu Zugu	Labourer	25/3/1965	Ghanaian
Haruna Myarku	Fitter	26/6/1965	Ghanaian
Emmanuel Kwame	Caterpillar Operator	27/11/1965	Ghanaian
Edmund K. Aboroso	Head Welder	15/2/1966	Ghanaian
Mahamadu Kotokoli		15/2/1966	Ghanaian
Johannes Mawukpe	Carpenter	15/2/1966	Ghanaian
Hunor Tei	Carpenter	15/2/1966	Ghanaian
Kofi Gbeku	Carpenter	15/2/1966	Ghanaian
Agbodemegbe Kofi	Carpenter Apprt	15/2/1966	Ghanaian
Arakenu Frafra	Labourer	15/2/1966	Ghanaian
Djobuah Tetteh	Carpenter	15/2/1966	Ghanaian
Martin Ayimadu	Electrician	15/2/1966	Ghanaian
Angelo Zangrando	Carpenter	15/2/1966	Italian
Ferruccio Bigoni	General Superintendent	22/2/1966	Italian
Joseph Afum Adu	Carpenter	22/2/1966	Ghanaian

== Gallery ==
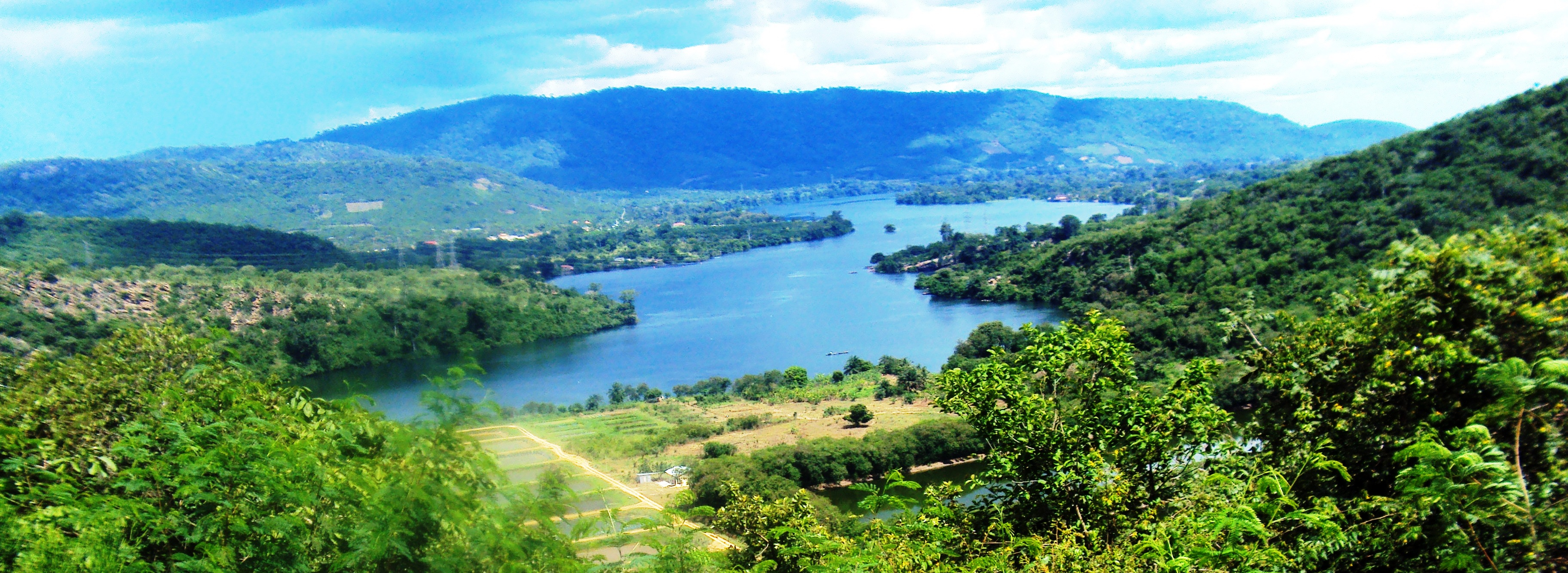
Volta Lake from the Saint Barbara Church
