= Atimpoku =

- Town
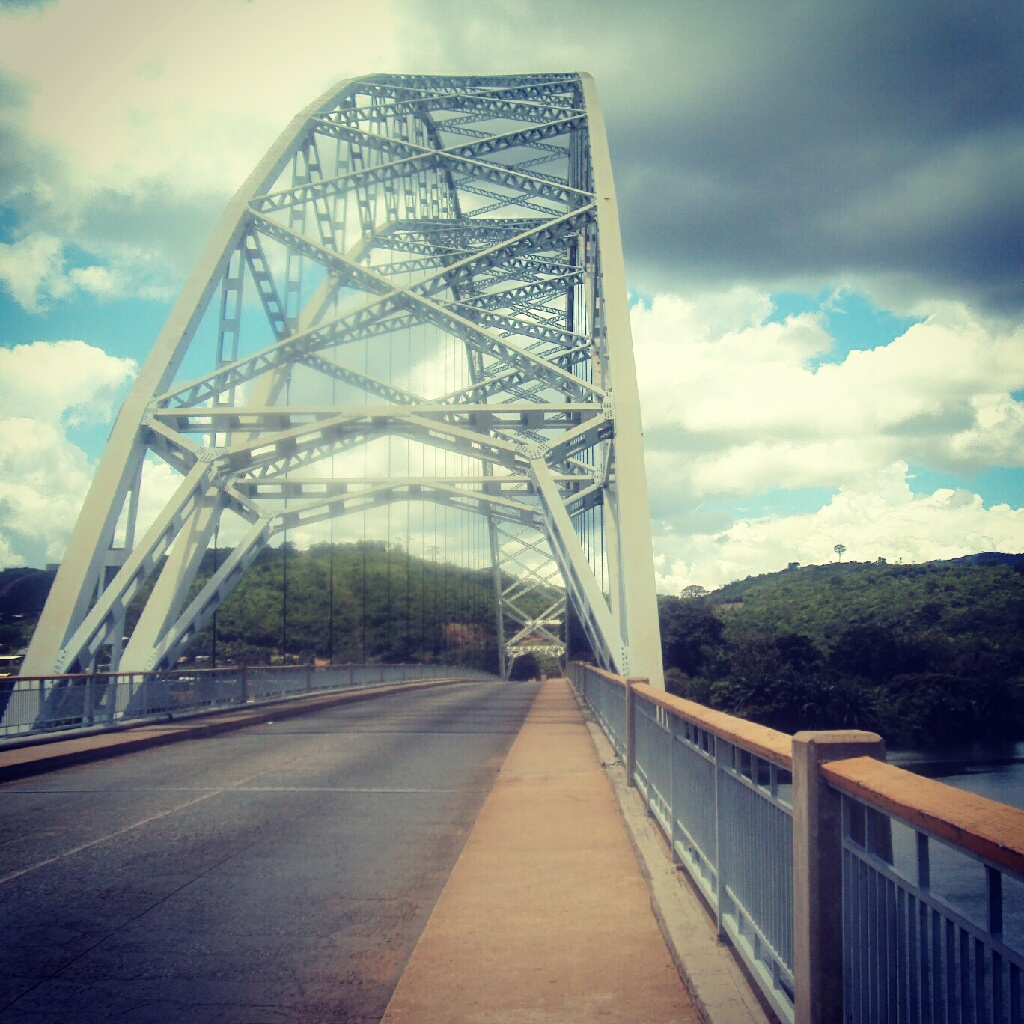
- Adomi Bridge crossing the Volta River in Atimpoku, Eastern Region, Ghana

- Asuogyaman District logo

- Location of Atimpoku in Eastern Region, Ghana
- Coordinates: 6°13′51″N 0°5′29″W
- Country: Ghana
- Region: Eastern Region
- District: Asuogyaman District
- Elevation: 12 m (39 ft)
- Time zone: GMT
  - Summer (DST): GMT

Atimpoku is a small town in the Eastern Region of Ghana and located along the Volta River. It is the capital of the Asuogyaman District, a district in the Eastern Region of Ghana.

== Geography ==
The town of Atimpoku is located on the banks of the Volta River, which drains south to the Gulf of Guinea, and is the location of the Adomi Bridge (originally the Volta Bridge), Ghana's longest suspension bridge and the first permanent bridge to span the Volta River. The town is about 2.5 miles downstream from Lake Volta and the Akosombo Dam, a hydroelectric facility which supplies electricity to Ghana and an electricity exporter to neighboring countries of Ghana.

Atimpoku is about 87 km (54 mi) northeast of Accra, the capital of Ghana, and about 75 km (47 mi) north of the port of Tema.
