= Asuogyaman District =

District in Eastern Region, Ghana

- District
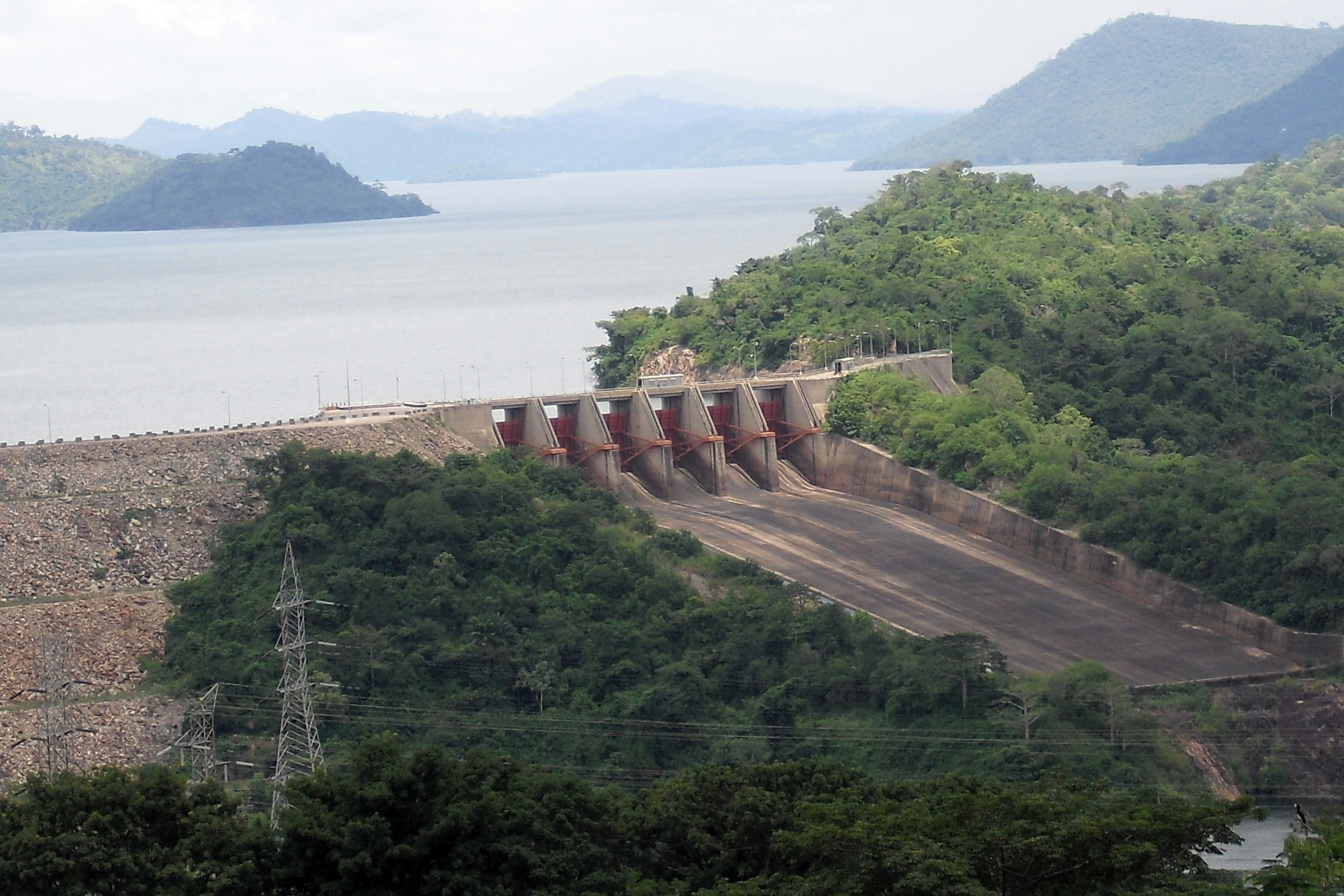
- Spillways of Akosombo dam with 6 floodgate in Akosombo, Ghana

- Seal

- Districts of Eastern Region

- Location of Asuogyaman District within Eastern
- Coordinates: 6°13′51.24″N 0°4′48″W
- Country: Ghana
- Region: Eastern
- Capital: Atimpoku

Government
  - District Executive: Hon. Samuel Kwame Agyekum
  - Presiding Member: Hon. Jonathan Hagan

Area
  - Total: 664 km^{2} (256 sq mi)

Population (2021)
  - Total: 101,256
  - Density: 152/km^{2} (395/sq mi)
- Time zone: UTC+0 (GMT)

Asuogyaman District is one of the thirty-three districts in Eastern Region, Ghana. Originally created as an ordinary district assembly in 1988, which it was created from the former Kaoga District Council. The district assembly is located in the eastern part of Eastern Region and has Atimpoku as its capital town.

== Akosombo Dam ==
Asuogyaman District is the location of a hydroelectric dam in South Ghana, the Akosombo Dam, in the town of Akosombo. Additionally, the district has some very notable tourist sites apart from the Akosombo Dam, including Dodi Island, Akosombo Port and Dodi Princess that takes tourists on a cruise. The district has within its catchment areas some beautiful hotels such as Volta Hotel, Afrikiko River Resort, and The Royal Senchi.

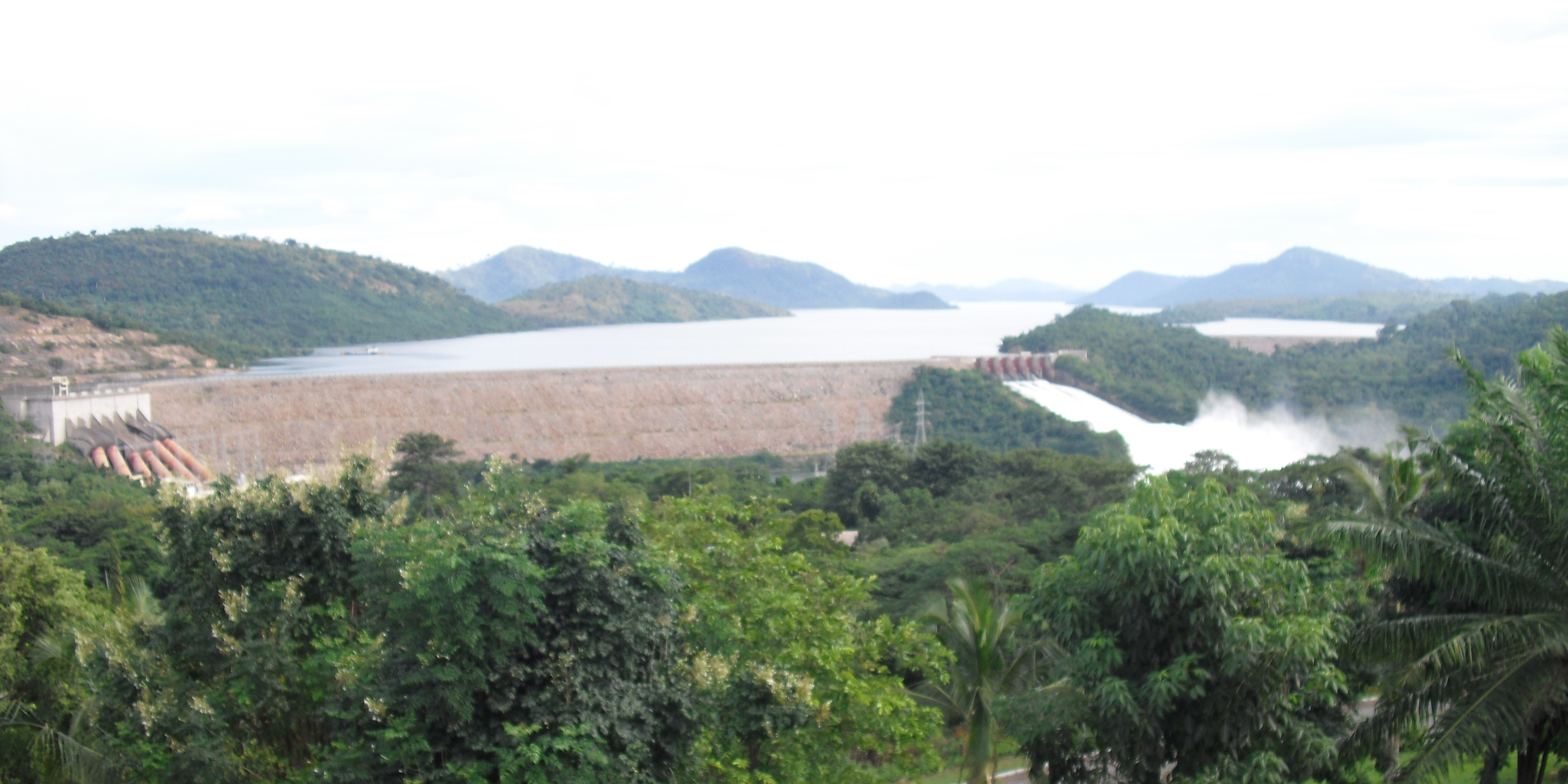
The Akosombo hydroelectric dam spilling water from the spillway.

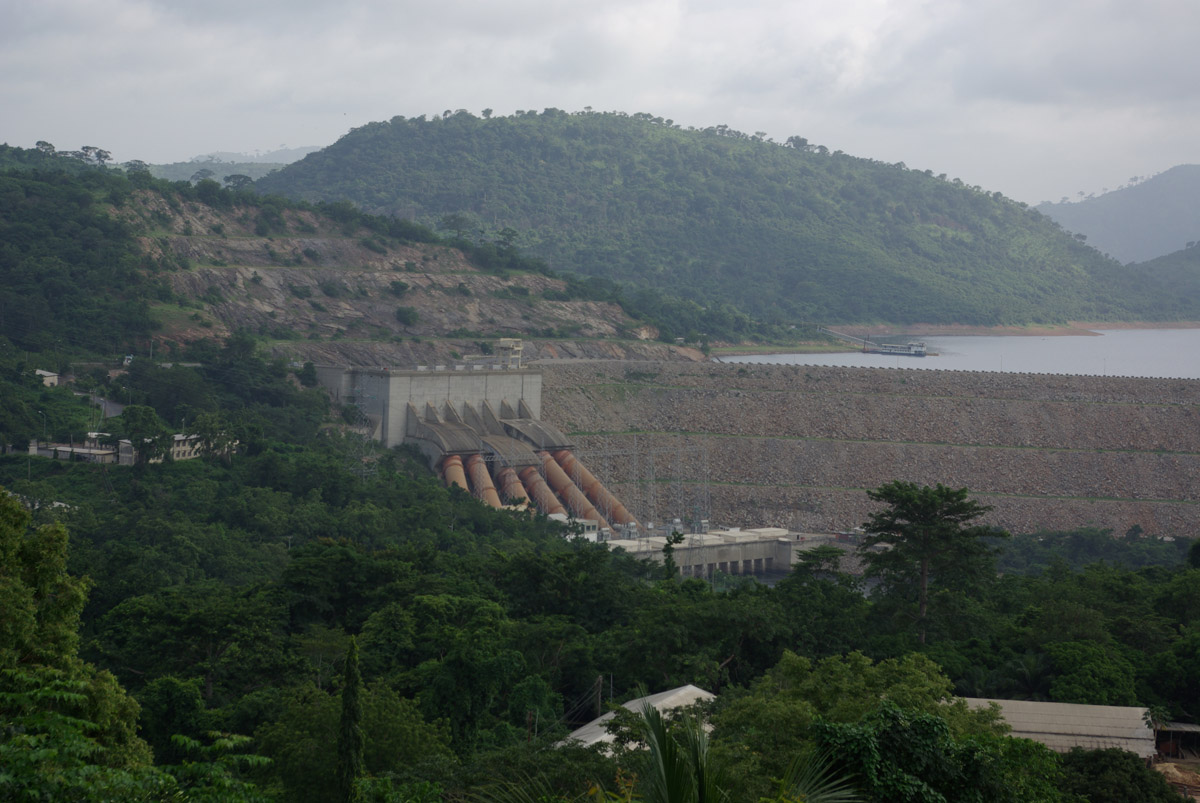
The Akosombo hydroelectric dam, seen from Volta Hotel, the most noted hotel overlooking the Akosombo Dam.

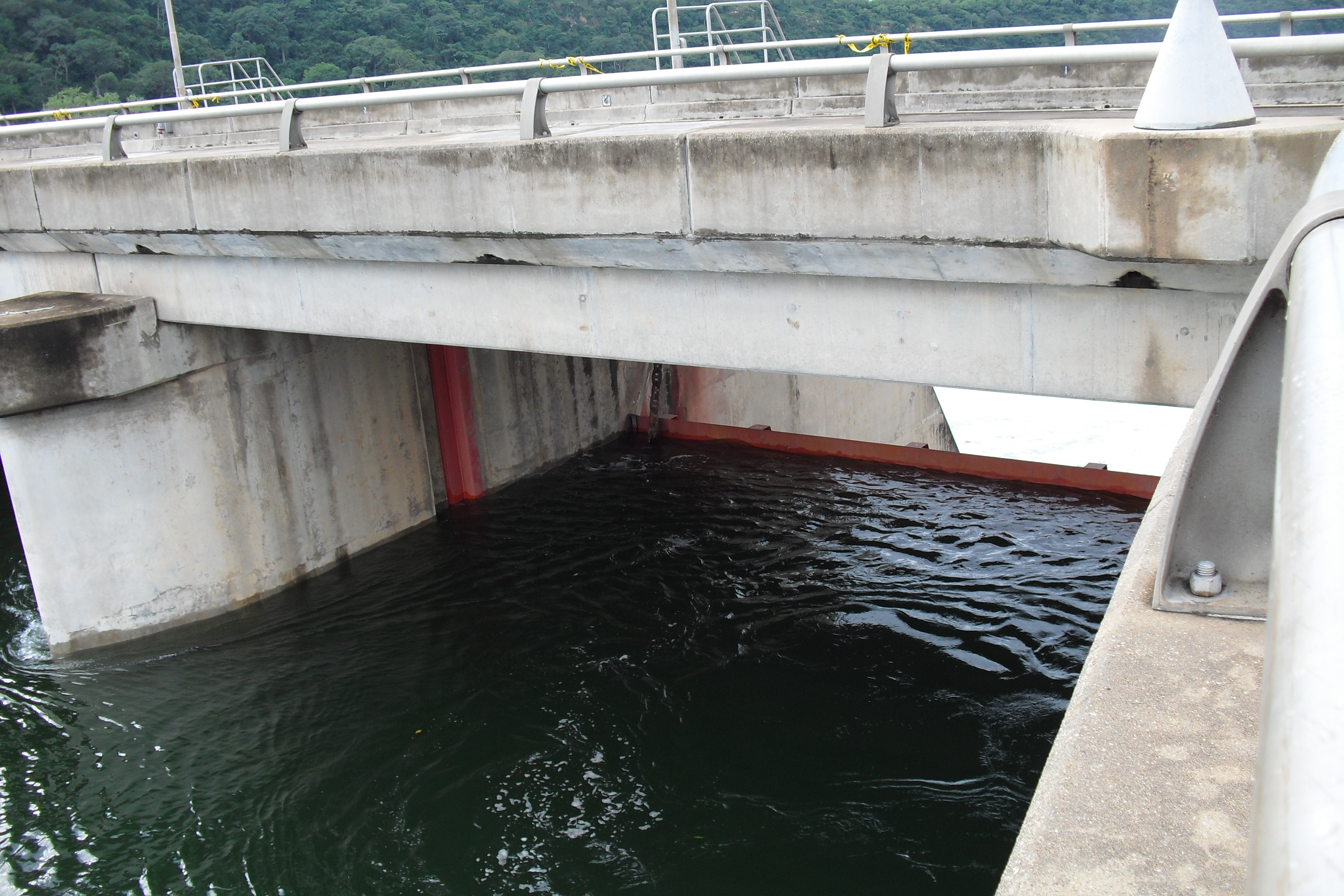
The Akosombo hydroelectric dam's floodgates.

== List of settlements ==
Settlements of Asuogyaman District
No.	Settlement	Population	Population year
1	Aboasa		
2	Anyansu		
3	Abomanyaw		
4	Akosombo		
5	Akwamufie		
6	Anum		
7	Apeguso		
8	Asikuma		
9	Atimpoku		
10	Boso		
11	Frankadua		
12	Gyakiti		
13	Labolabo		
14	New Adjena		
15	New Akrade		
16	New Senchi		
17	Old Senchi		
18	Pupuni		
19	South Senchi		

== Sources ==
- "Asuogyaman District". Statoids.
- Districts: Asuogyaman District
