= Hyder Consulting =

Advisory and design consultancy

Hyder Consulting plc
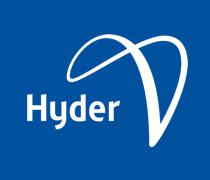
- Successor: Arcadis
- Number of employees: 4,200
- Parent: Arcadis NV
- Website: Hyder Consulting

Hyder Consulting was a multi-national advisory and design consultancy with particular specialisation in the transport, property, utilities and environmental sectors. The firm employed approximately 4,200 people across the UK, Europe, Germany, Middle East, Asia and Australia and had been listed on the London Stock Exchange since October 2002. The name Hyder is the Welsh word for "confidence".

== History ==
Hyder Consulting was formed in 1993 when engineering firms Acer Group and Wallace Evans Ltd were acquired by Welsh Water and subsequently merged.

Acer Group was itself an internationally recognised consultancy practice formed in 1987 by the merger of John Taylor and Sons (established 1739) and Freeman Fox and Partners (established 1857), and joined in 1991 by Sir Bruce White, Wolfe Barry, and Partners.

Hyder Consulting was subsequently acquired by Western Power Distribution, which prompted Hyder's senior management to instigate a management buy-out that was completed in January 2001. The firm was then listed on the London Stock Exchange in October 2002.

Freeman Fox and Partners had been involved in Melbourne's West Gate Bridge disaster in 1970. Thirty-five construction workers were killed and 18 injured in the collapse, and it remains Australia's worst industrial accident to this day. Other structures involving Freeman Fox and Partners included the Sydney Harbour Bridge (1932), the Adomi Bridge (1957) and the Erskine Bridge (1971).

In October 2014 it was acquired by Arcadis NV and the Hyder Consulting brand was phased out from 2015.
