= Yapei =

Yapei Yapei
- Town
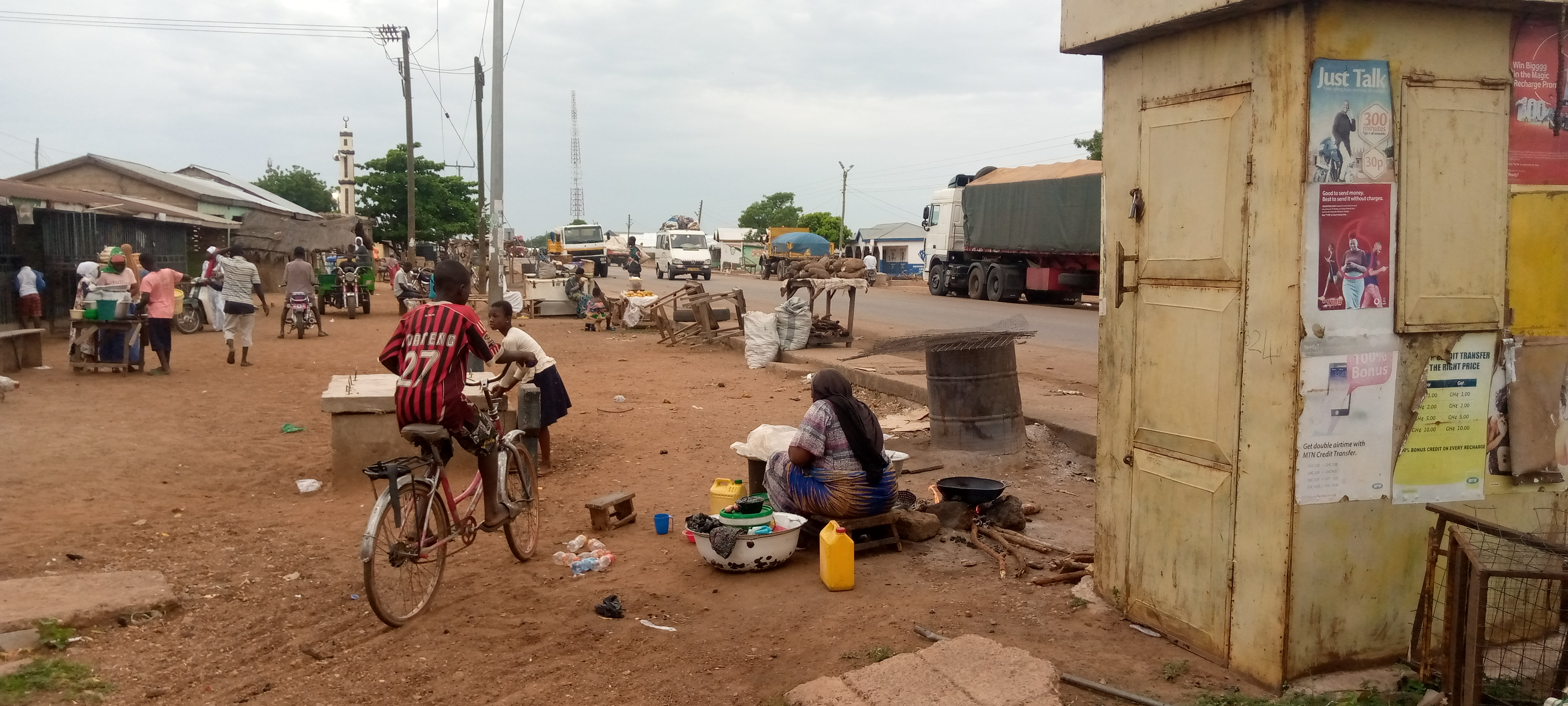
- Street in Yapei

- Location of Yapei in Savannah region, North Ghana
- Coordinates: 9°10′N 1°10′W
- Country: Ghana
- Region: Savannah Region
- District: Central Gonja District
- Time zone: GMT
  - Summer (DST): GMT

Yapei or Yape is a small town in the Central Gonja District, a district in the Savannah Region of north Ghana.

== Geography ==
The White Volta passes through the town; making it an important terminus point. There are few rapids on the eastern end of the river towards Akosombo. As a result, navigation is possible; the Yapei Queen Ship, which is a cargo ship used to sail from Akosombo with petrol and other convenience food stuffs up to the Yapei port.

== Economy ==
The presence of limestone has attracted cement companies; SAVACEM, to set up cement production manufacturing plants in Yapei. The BOST (Bulk Oil Storage and Transport) company of Ghana has also built petrol reservoirs in Yapei where petrol and other products are transported via pipeline transport and pipes from Juapong up to Bupei and then carted by lorries to Bolgatanga and Wa.
