= Adomi Bridge =

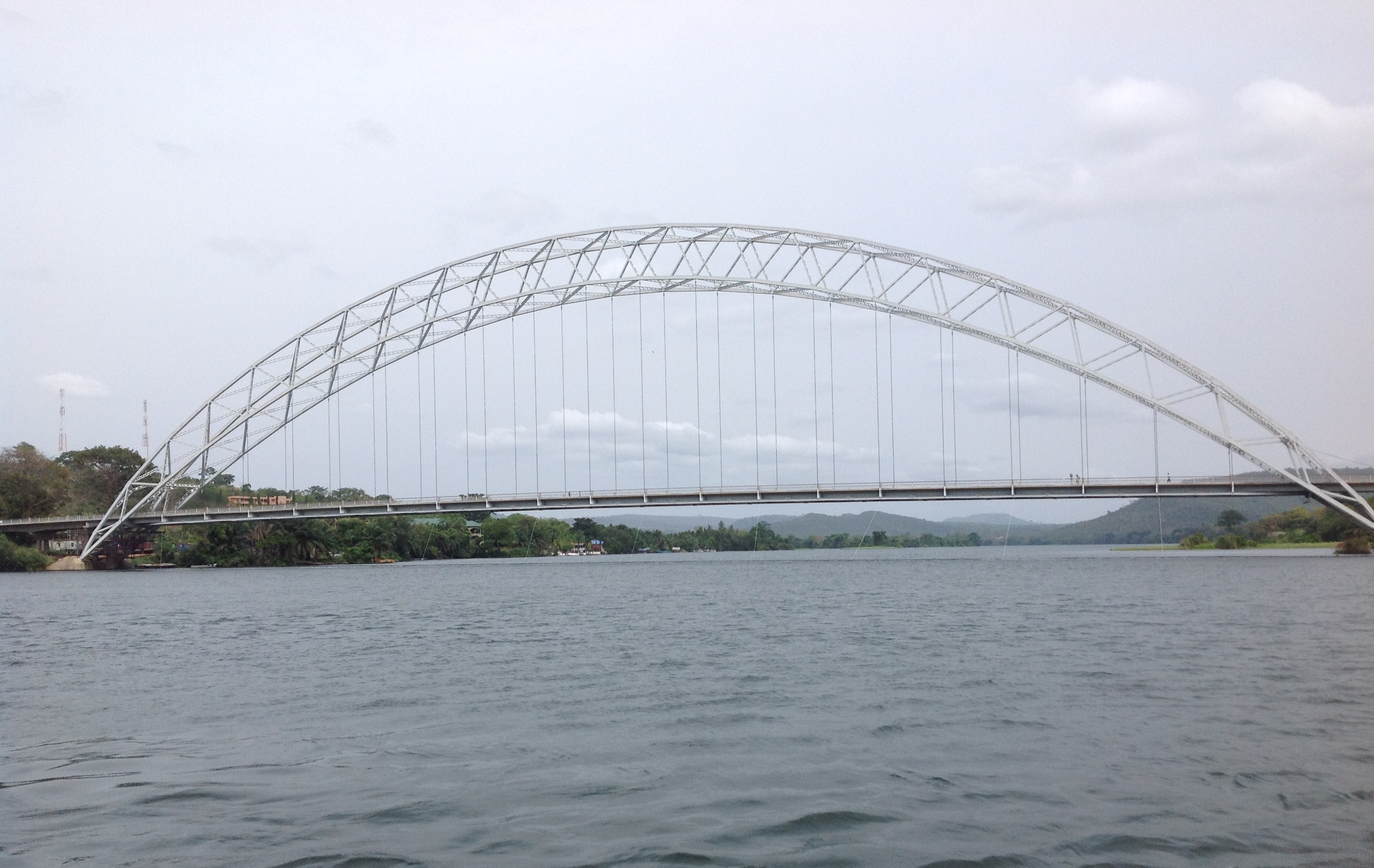
- Adomi Bridge at Atimpoku
- Coordinates: 6°14′22″N 0°05′44″E
- Carries: National Route N2
- Crosses: Volta River, downstream of the Akosombo Dam
- Locale: Atimpoku, Eastern Region, Ghana
- Official name: Adomi Bridge
- Other name: Volta Bridge
- Maintained by: Ghana Highway Authority

Characteristics
- Design: silver crescent arch bridge with deck suspended from arch
- Total length: 334 m (1,096 ft)
- Width: 11.9 m (39 ft)
- Longest span: 245 m (804 ft)

History
- Designer: Sir William Halcrow & Partners
- Contracted lead designer: William Brown of Freeman Fox & Partners
- Constructed by: Dorman Long (Bridge and Engineering) Ltd
- Fabrication by: Cleveland Bridge & Engineering Company
- Construction start: March 1955
- Construction end: January 1957
- Construction cost: 682 thousand British pounds
- Opened: 25 January 1957; 69 years ago

Statistics
- Daily traffic: 2 lanes of vehicular traffic

Location
- Interactive map of Adomi Bridge

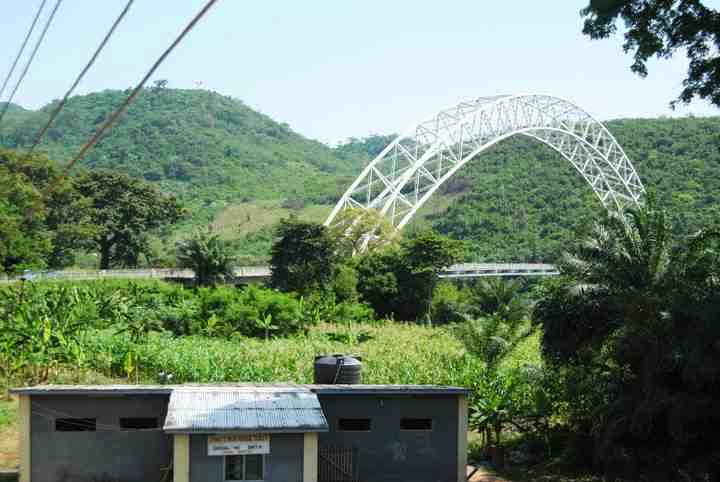
Adomi bridge

The Adomi Bridge (originally the Volta Bridge) is a latticed steel arch suspension bridge crossing the Volta River at Atimpoku in Ghana in West Africa. It is the first permanent bridge to span the Volta River, which drains south into the Gulf of Guinea, and is Ghana's longest suspension bridge. It provides the main road passage, just south of the Akosombo Dam, between the Eastern Region and the Volta Region of Ghana. It was opened in 1957 by Kwame Nkrumah, Ghana's first president. The iconic crescent-shaped arch bridge is featured in Ghanaian stamps and currency.

== History ==
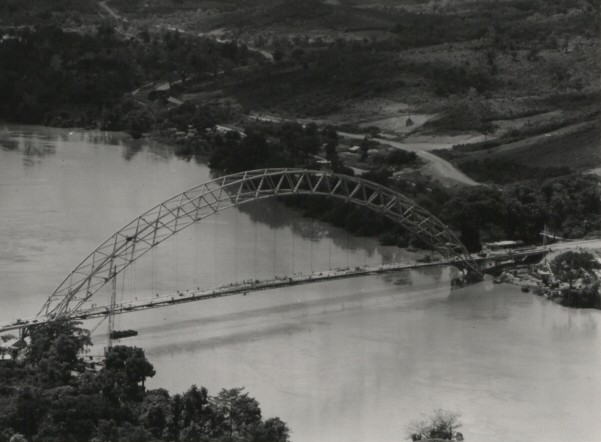
Adomi Bridge under construction in 1957. The N2 in the background links Tema with the Volta Region

In 1953 (before the independence of Ghana in 1956 from British colonial rule), the decision was made to build a bridge across the Volta River to replace the overloaded ferry service at Senchi where delays were occasionally up to a few days. Reconnaissance indicated a good site for a single-span crossing about 800ft long at a narrow neck of the river at Adomi, about 2.5 miles upstream of the ferry and closer to the then-projected dam and power station in the Volta River Project. Several sketch designs for an arch bridge or a suspension bridge at Adomi and other sites were drawn and cost estimates were developed. The Standing Development Committee chose the single-span arch at Adomi.

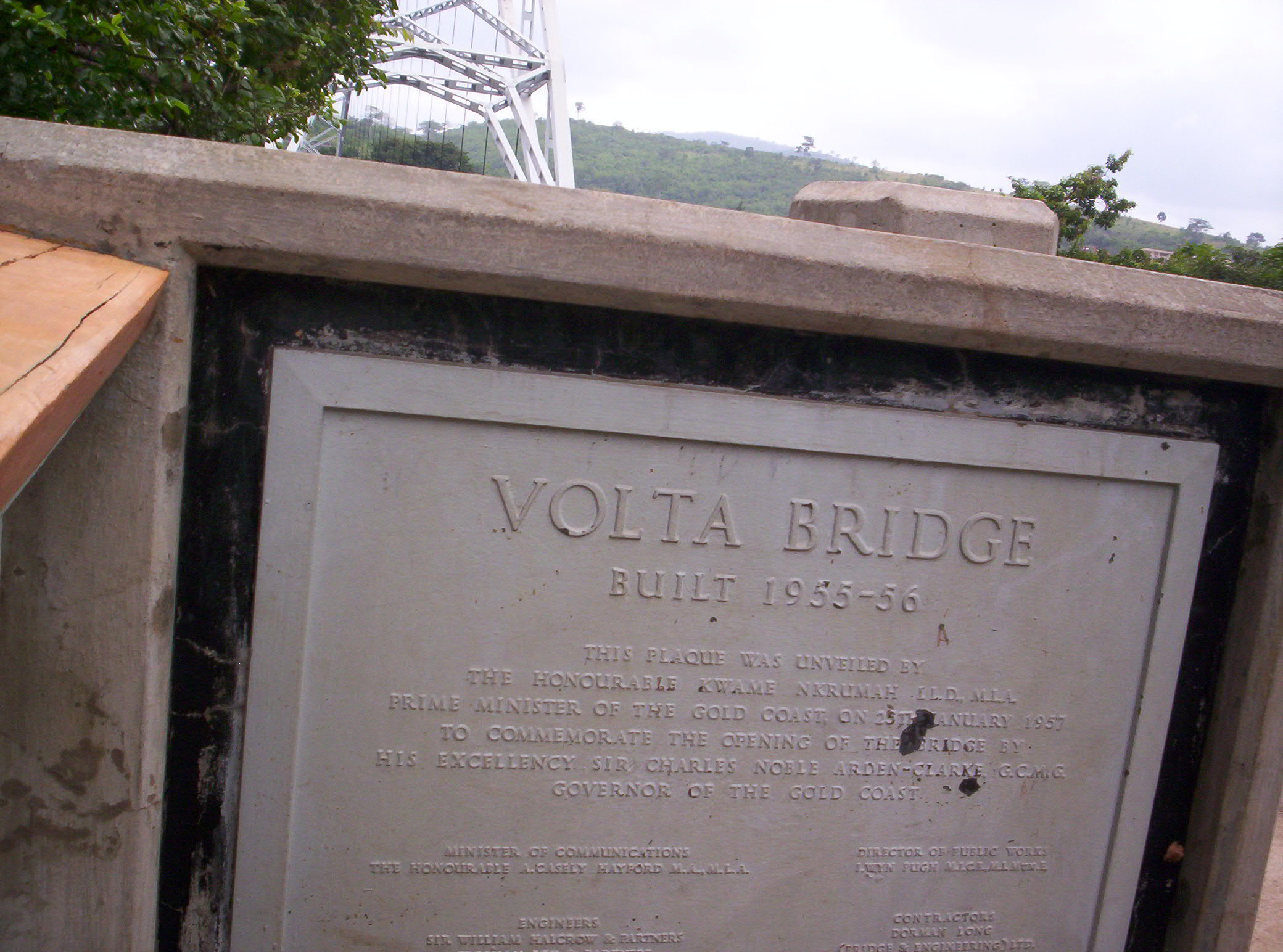
Plague commemorating 1957 opening by Kwame Nkrumah

In Fall 1953 the consulting engineers were appointed: Sir William Halcrow & Partners were the project administrators and designed all approach roads and spans, while Freeman Fox & Partners were to design the single-span arch bridge. A year later, tenders were invited for the complete project, including approach roads, the arch bridge and approach spans. By January 1955, the contracts were settled and some construction staff began to arrive on site. Dorman Long (Bridge and Engineering) Ltd was the main construction contractor and Cleveland Bridge & Engineering Company was the steelwork fabricator. Work on the bridge began in March 1955, with the steel parts being prefabricated in the United Kingdom, while concrete works for the approach spans and the bridge abutments were carried out on site. The prefabricated parts were fully welded, but almost all on-site steelwork erections were designed as bolted connections, including those of the upper and lower chord of the crescent-shaped arch. The concrete carriageway was built after the steelwork was completed for the arch and the deck. By January 1957 the project was substantially completed. The total cost of the completed project was 682 thousand British pounds.

== Design of arch bridge ==
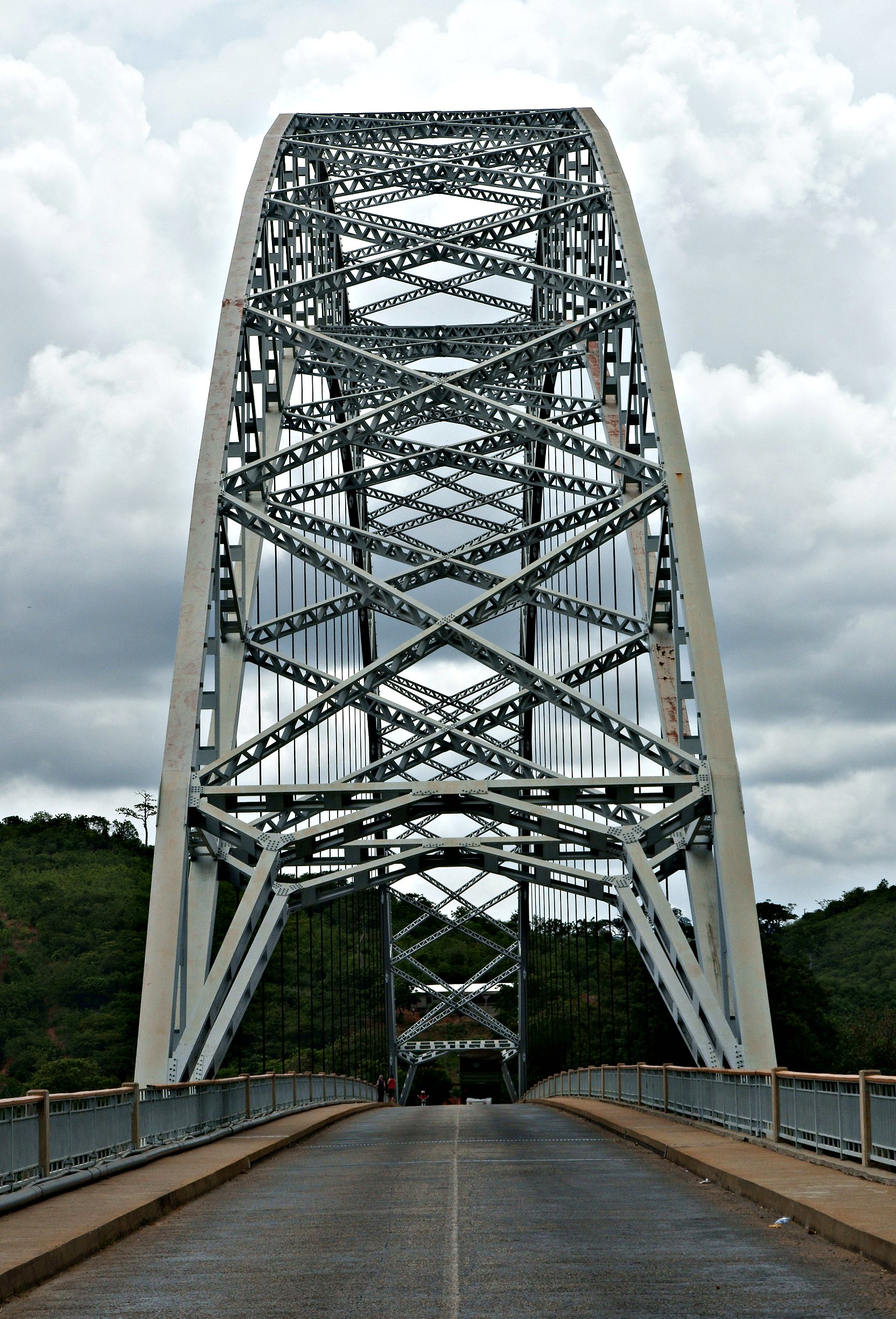
Adomi Bridge steel arch supporting two-lane roadway

The single-span arch bridge was designed by William Brown of the engineers' Freeman Fox & Partners. It is a two-hinged silver latticed steel crescent-shaped arch bridge with a two-lane road deck suspended by cables. The lower-chord arch rises 158.5 ft (48.3 m) above the hinges and the main span is 805 ft (245 m) long. To make an aesthetically pleasing crescent-shaped arch, the lower curve formed by the lower chords is a parabola, and the upper curve is derived from it by offsets decreasing logarithmically from the center to the hinges.

Aesthetically the arch was the perfect complement to the trough of the valley... and the silver colour proposed for the steelwork would offset the green of the hills against which it would be seen. --Scott and Roberts (1958)

As the roadbed is suspended by means of vertical cable stays (hangers) connected to the steel truss arch, the bridge can be considered as a hybrid arch suspension type. Pairs of vertical cables or hangers are attached at 35-ft intervals to the deck transverse beams, which, along with six longitudinal stringer beams and bracers in between the transverse beams, support the weight of the roadway and its load.

The bridge was officially opened on 25 January 1957 by Kwame Nkrumah, then Prime Minister of the Gold Coast and first President of Ghana. It carries the National Route N2 and has been of tremendous help to travelers and traders who use the road to access the east and north regions of Ghana.

== Route to the bridge ==
The Adomi Bridge is located in Atimpoku in the Eastern Region of Ghana, which is along the Volta River. The bridge carries National Route N2 and connects parts of the Eastern Region and Juapong in the North Tongu District, Ho, Hohoe, and other towns in the Volta Region. A trip from the northern regions of Ghana on N2 would go through the eastern corridor and finally use the Adomi Bridge to cross the Volta River. The bridge is about 87 km (54 mi) northeast of Accra, the capital of Ghana, and about 75 km (47 mi) north of the port of Tema.

== Rehabilitation works ==
- 2008: Some serious cracks, possibly due to fatigue fracture, on the bridge deck's traverse beam at mid-span were discovered. Following these findings, the Government of Ghana imposed a load limit on the bridge to slow down the damage rate. The cracked girders were locally strengthened by the installation of additional steel plates at the affected areas. The continued use of the bridge by overloaded trucks however, further compromised the deck's safety and stability.
- 2009: More cracks developed, mainly around the same area as the earlier ones were discovered; this necessitated major rehabilitation works on the suspension bridge deck.
- 2011: A full bridge inspection was completed in April 2011. Overall, the arch was found to be in good condition, but the bridge deck was structurally much worse than expected, which was attributed to high traffic loads and lack of maintenance, and should be replaced.
- 2014: The bridge was closed to traffic on 10 March 2014 for the replacement of the entire suspended road deck and all hangers, by engineers of Bilfinger MCE GmbH of Austria for 13 million euros. The old concrete deck was replaced by a lighter, stronger orthotropic deck with a double spine: a steel plate with two continuous longitudinal girders, running under roadway/walkway curbs, along the entire suspended span.
- 2015: Newly rehabilitated bridge opened to traffic in December 2015.

== Tourist Site ==
In April 2019, Adomi Bridge was classified as a tourist site after a consensus between the Asuogyaman District, Ghana Highway Authority and Ghana Tourism Development Company (GTDC).

== Gallery ==
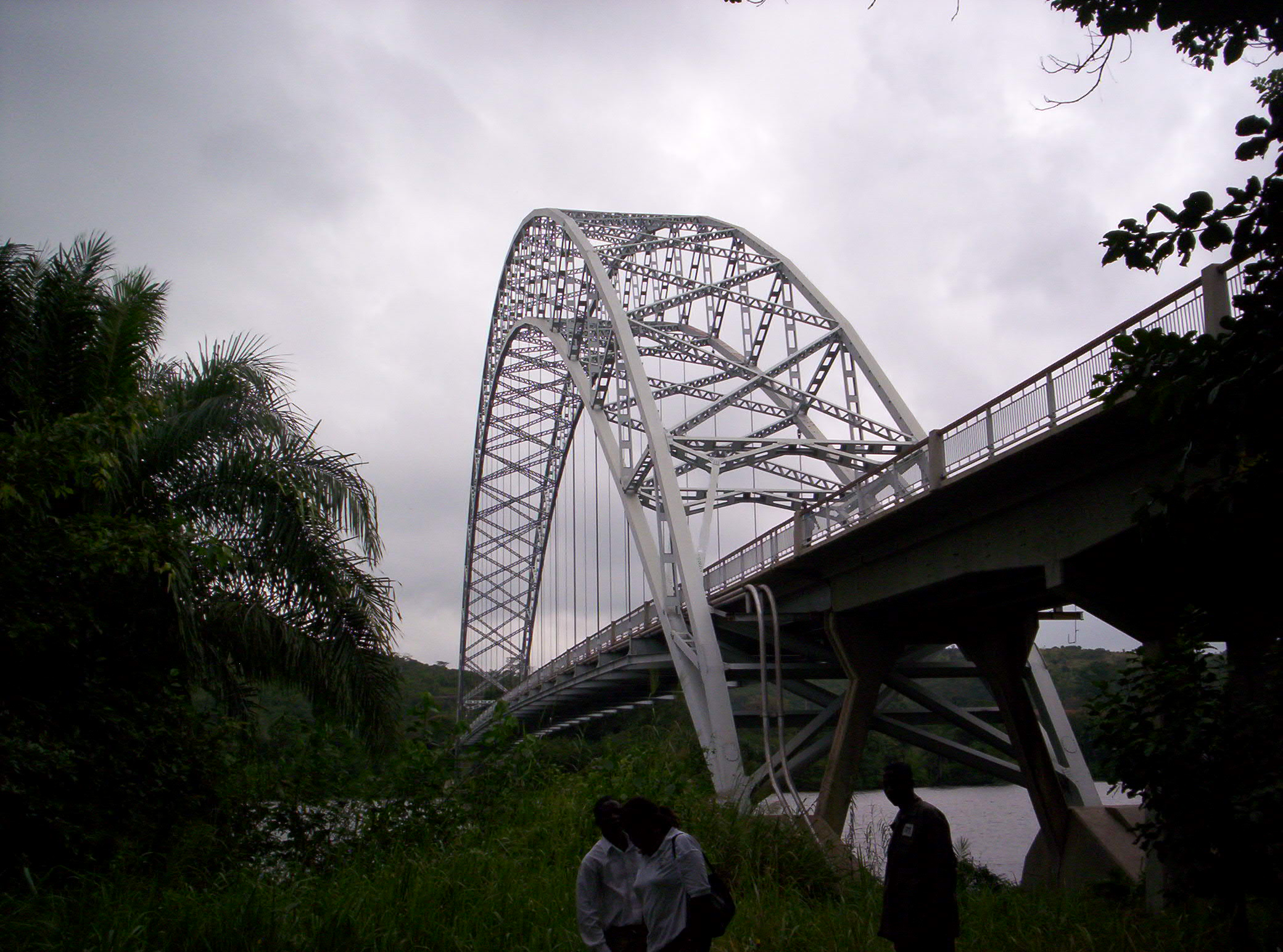
Adomi Bridge from abutment

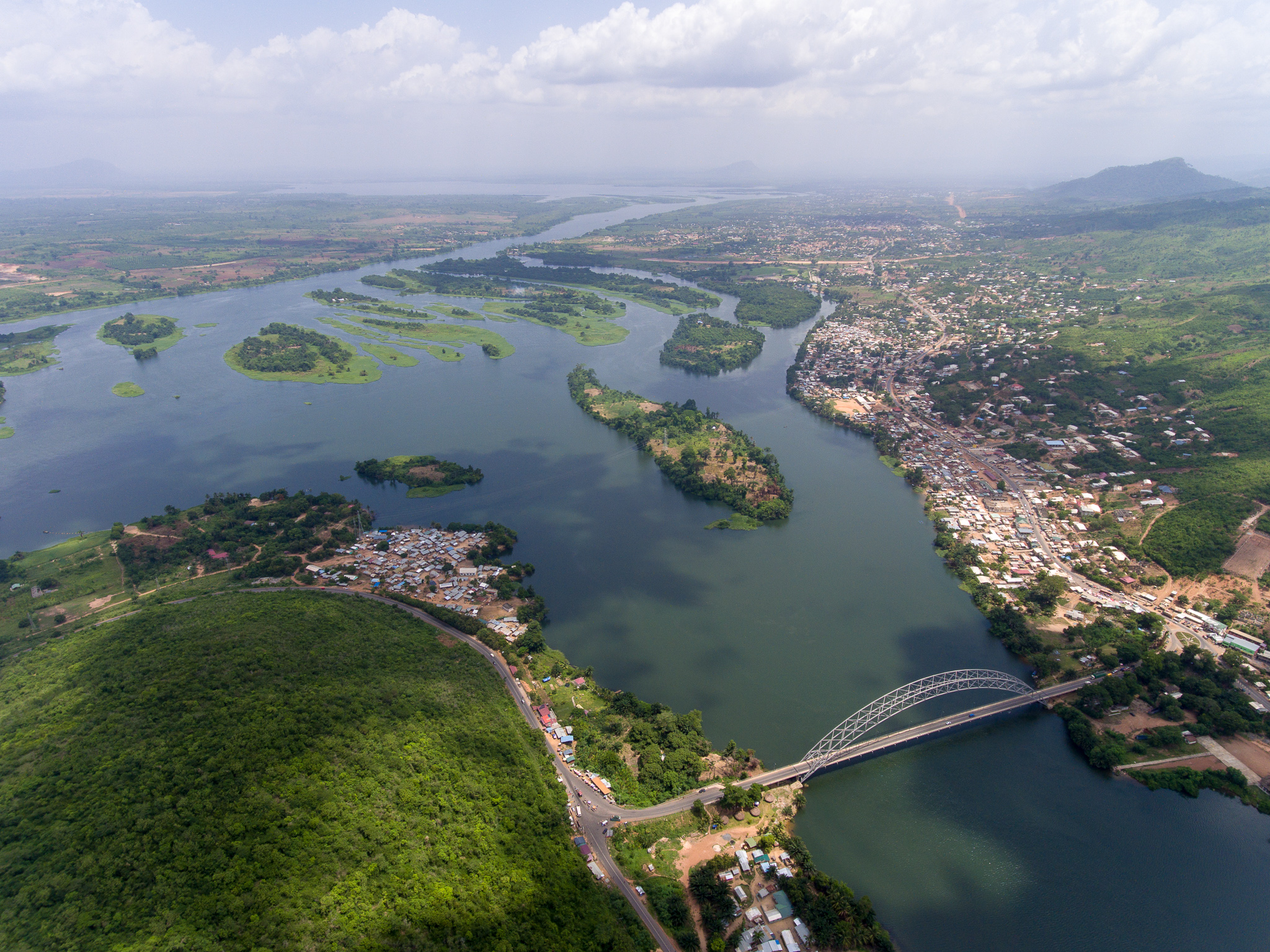
Aerial view from the north of the Adomi Bridge

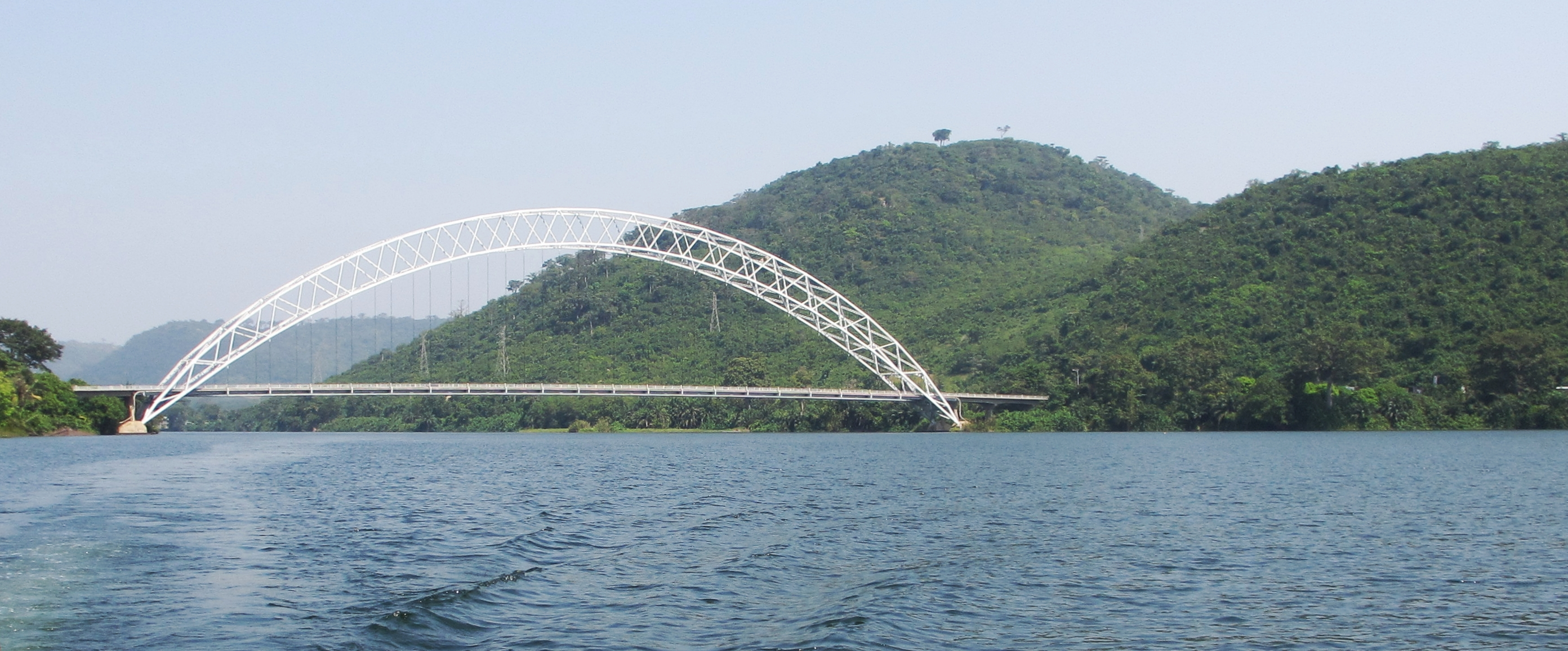
The silver crescent-shaped Adomi Bridge from the Volta River

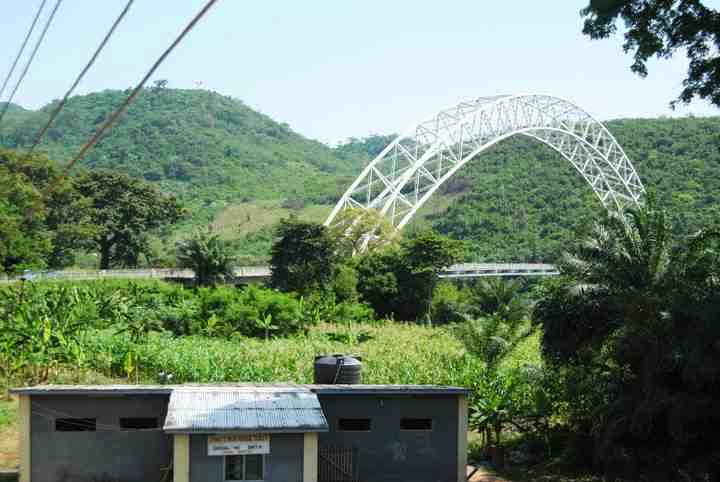
Adomi Bridge in 2010

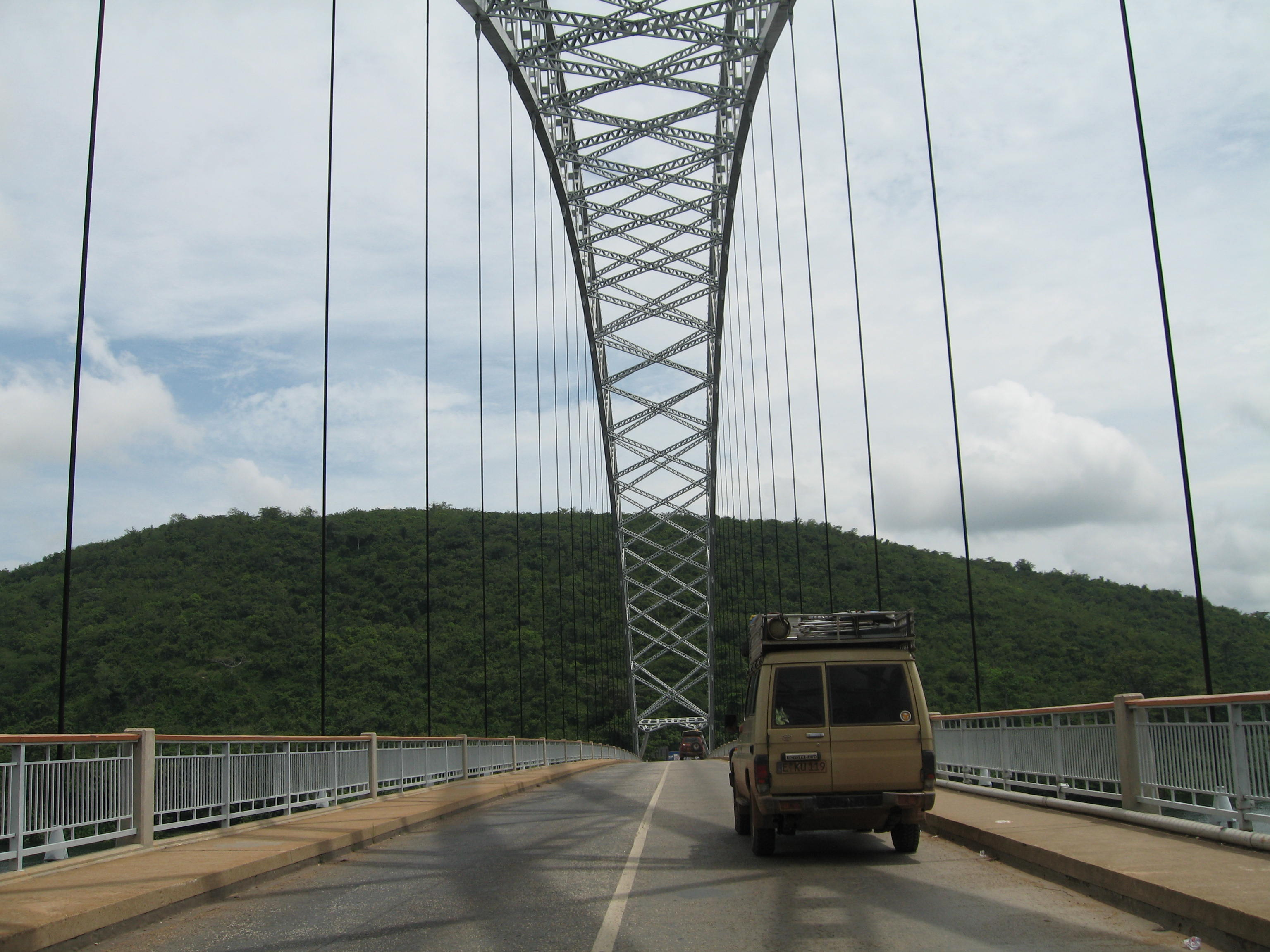
Adomi Bridge hangers from arch to the transverse beams

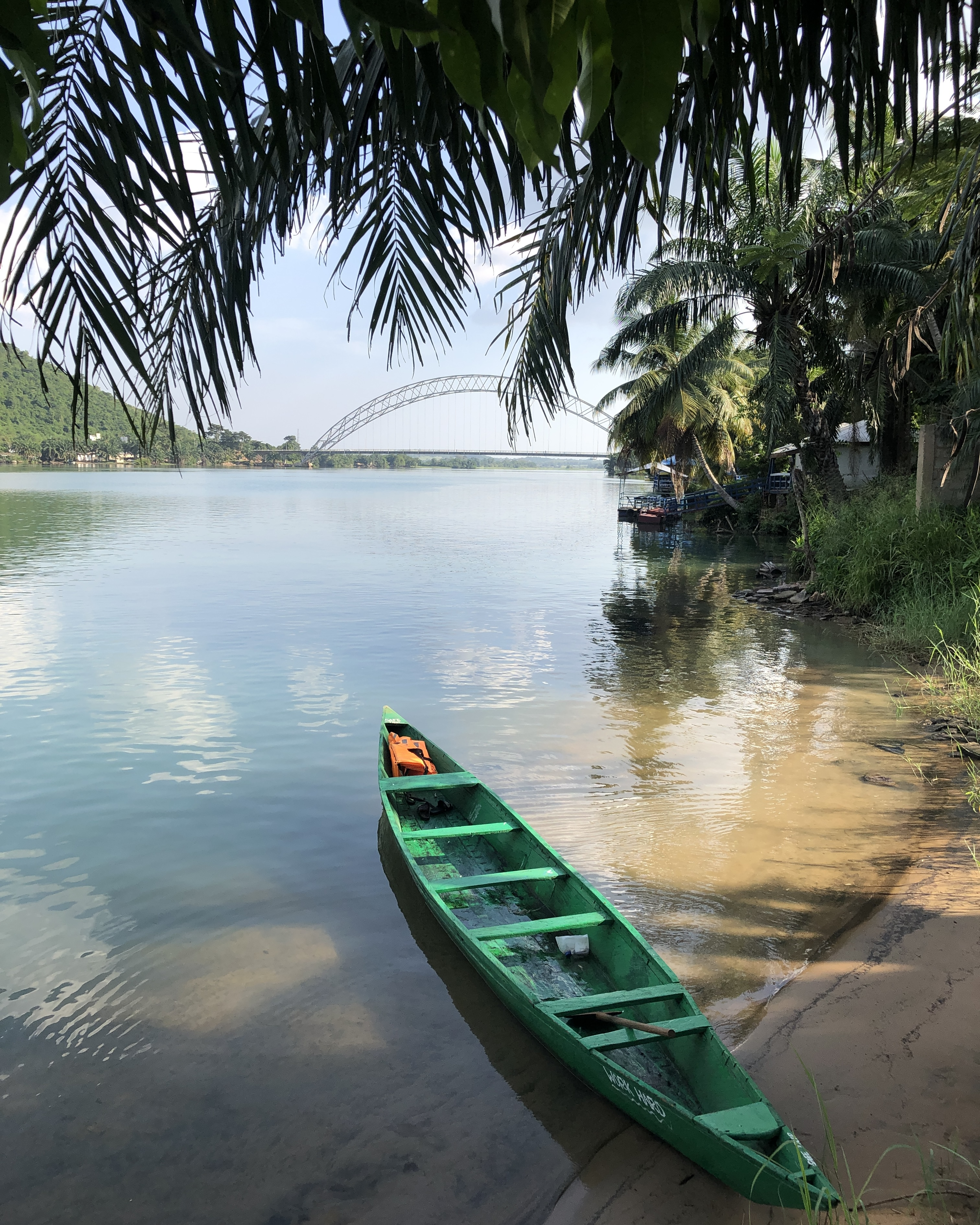
Adomi bridge from afar

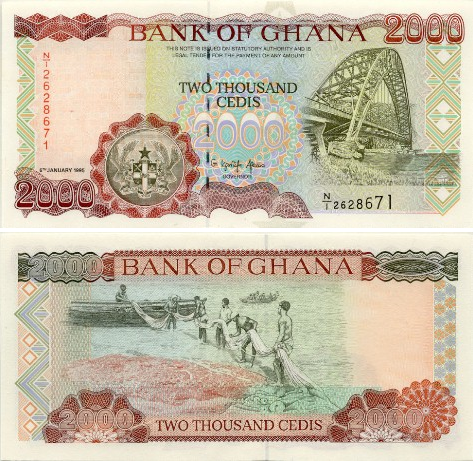
Adomi Bridge on a 1994 2000 Cedis banknote

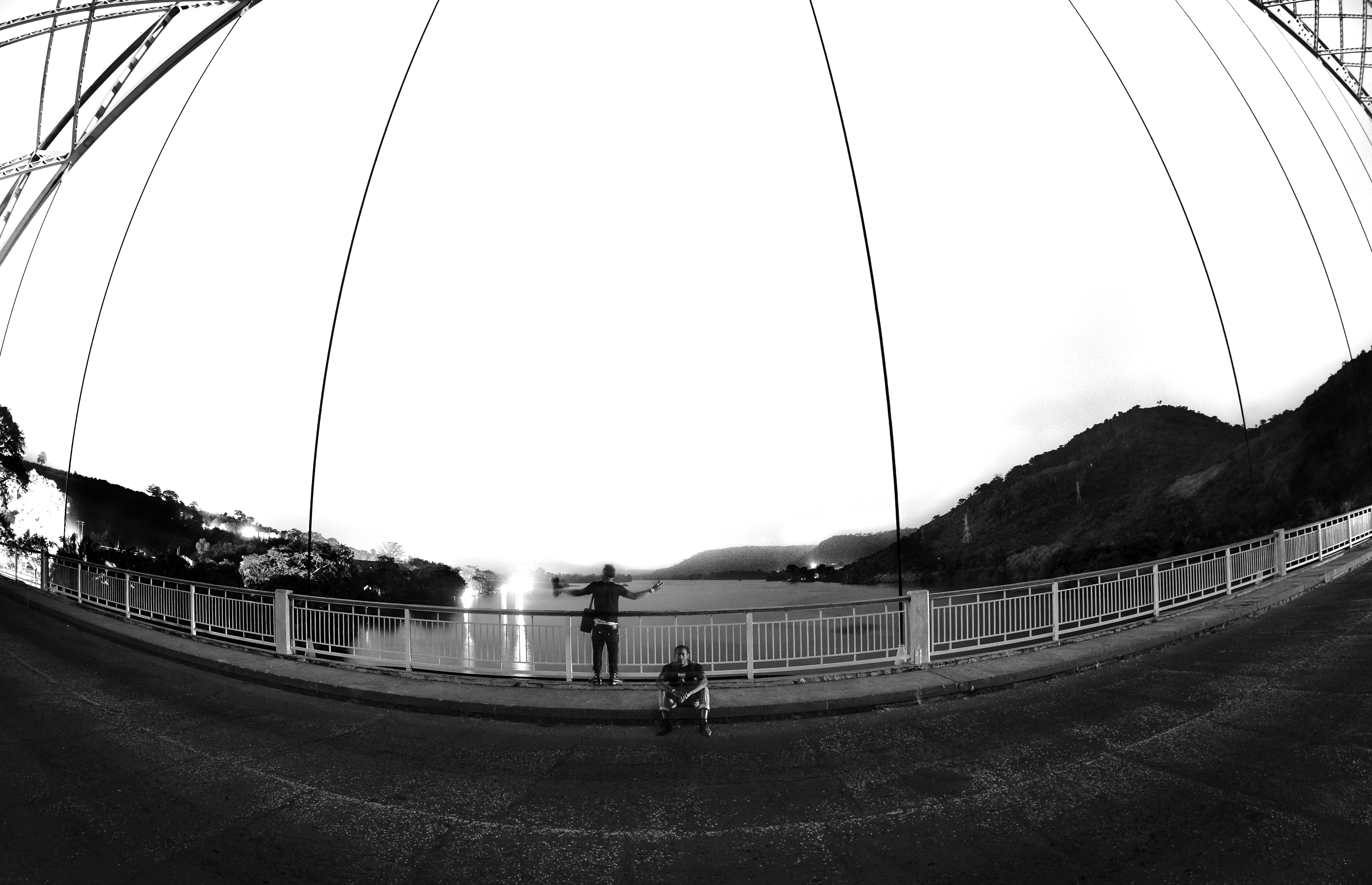
Adomi bridge
