= Volta River =

River in West Africa

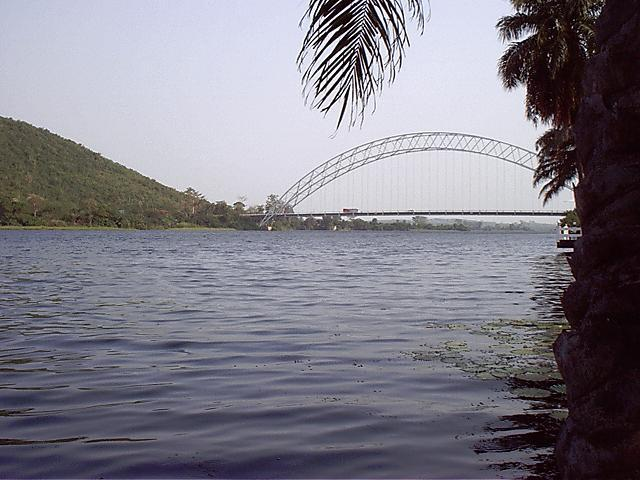
- The Adomi Bridge crosses the Volta river south of the Akosombo Dam.

- Map of the Volta River drainage basin and its three main tributaries, the White Volta, Red Volta, and Black Volta rivers
- Native name: Fleuve Volta (French); Asuo Firaw (Akan); Amuga (Ewe)

Location
- Countries: Ghana; Burkina Faso; Ivory Coast

Physical characteristics
- Mouth: Gulf of Guinea
  - location: Atlantic Ocean
  - coordinates: 5°46′N 0°41′E
- Length: 1,500 km (930 mi)
- Basin size: 407,093 km^{2} (157,179 sq mi)
- Discharge
  - location: Mouth
  - average: 1,210 m^{3}/s (43,000 cu ft/s)

The Volta River (Akan: Asuo Firaw, Ewe: Amuga, French: Fleuve Volta) is the main river system in the West African country of Ghana. It flows south into Ghana from the Bobo-Dioulasso highlands of Burkina Faso.

The three main parts of the river are the Black Volta, the White Volta, and the Red Volta. In the northwest, the Black Volta forms the international borders of the Ivory Coast, Ghana, and Burkina Faso. The Volta flows southward along the Akwapim-Togoland highlands, and empties into the Atlantic Ocean at the Gulf of Guinea at Ada Foah. One of its smaller tributaries, the Oti River, enters Ghana from Togo in the east. The Volta River has been dammed at Akosombo for generating hydroelectricity. The reservoir named Lake Volta stretches from Akosombo Dam in the south to the northern part of the country, and is the largest man-made reservoir by area in the world.

The country of Burkina Faso was formerly called Upper Volta, after the river.

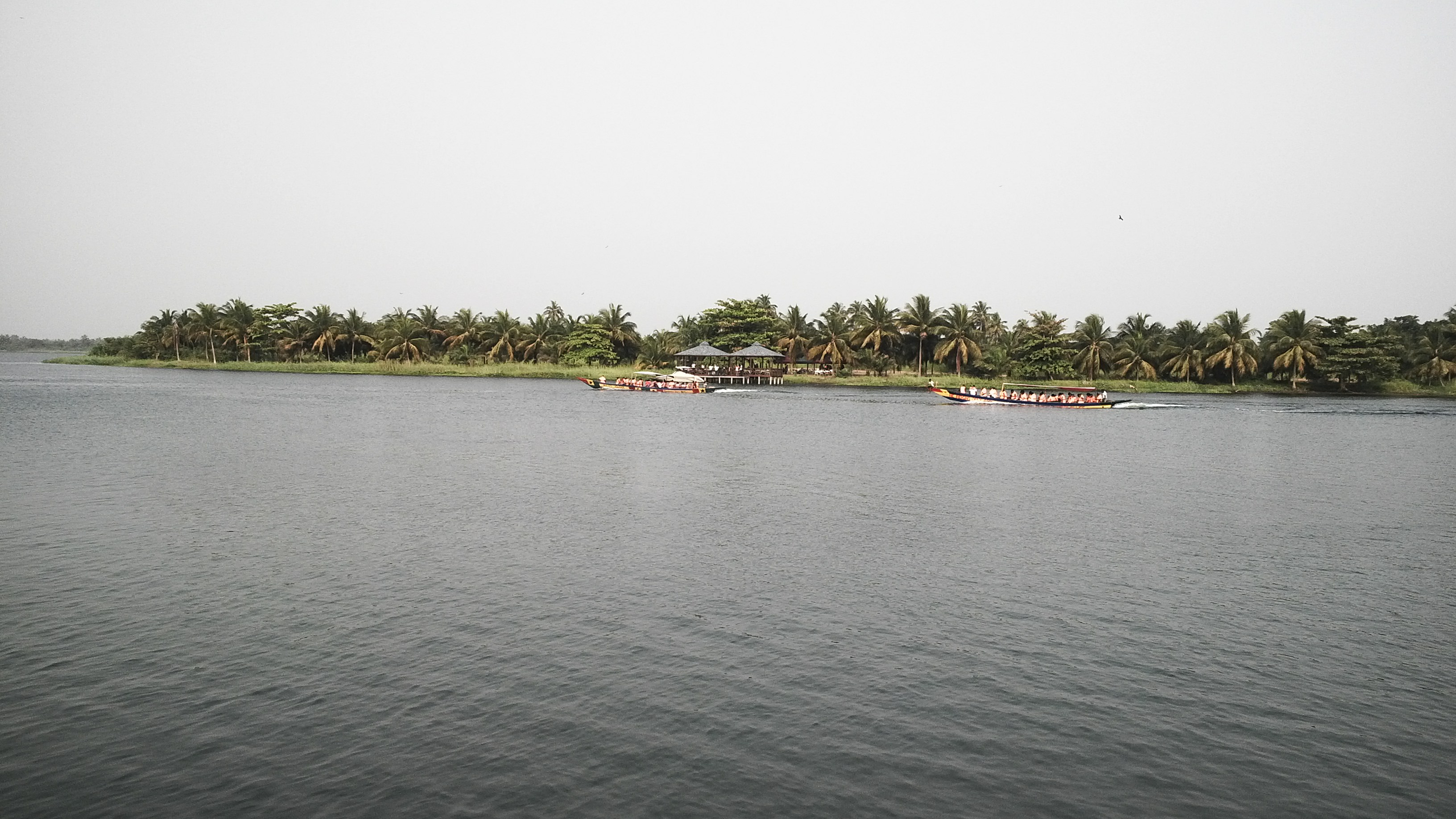
Ada, Volta River

== The reservoir ==
Lake Volta is a reservoir impounded by the Akosombo Dam on the lower Volta River in southern Ghana. It is one of the largest reservoirs in the world. It extends from the Akosombo Dam in southeastern Ghana to the town of Yapei in the Central Gonja District, Northern Region of Ghana, some 400 kilometres (250 mi) to the north.

The dam's power plant generates electricity for the Volta River Authority, and the reservoir also provides water transport routes. It is a resource for irrigation, and fish farming.

The depth of the river is about 45 feet (14 m) below Lake Volta. The Volta River is crossed by the Adomi Bridge just below the Akosombo Dam.

== History ==
The Akwamu people who once built a kingdom on both the east, and the west banks of the river spanning present day Ghana, Togo, and Benin call it Firaw. They have a deity dedicated to the river named Mfodwo.

The Volta River was named by Portuguese gold traders in Ghana. It was their furthest extent of exploration before returning (volta is Portuguese for "twist" or "turn"). It has been known as the "River of return" (perhaps, because it was where ships turned around and headed for home) or "river of the bend", in reference to its curved course.

== See also ==
- Impacts of the Akosombo Hydroelectric Project — environmental and human health issues from the Akosombo Dam and Lake Volta.
