= Akosombo =

- Town
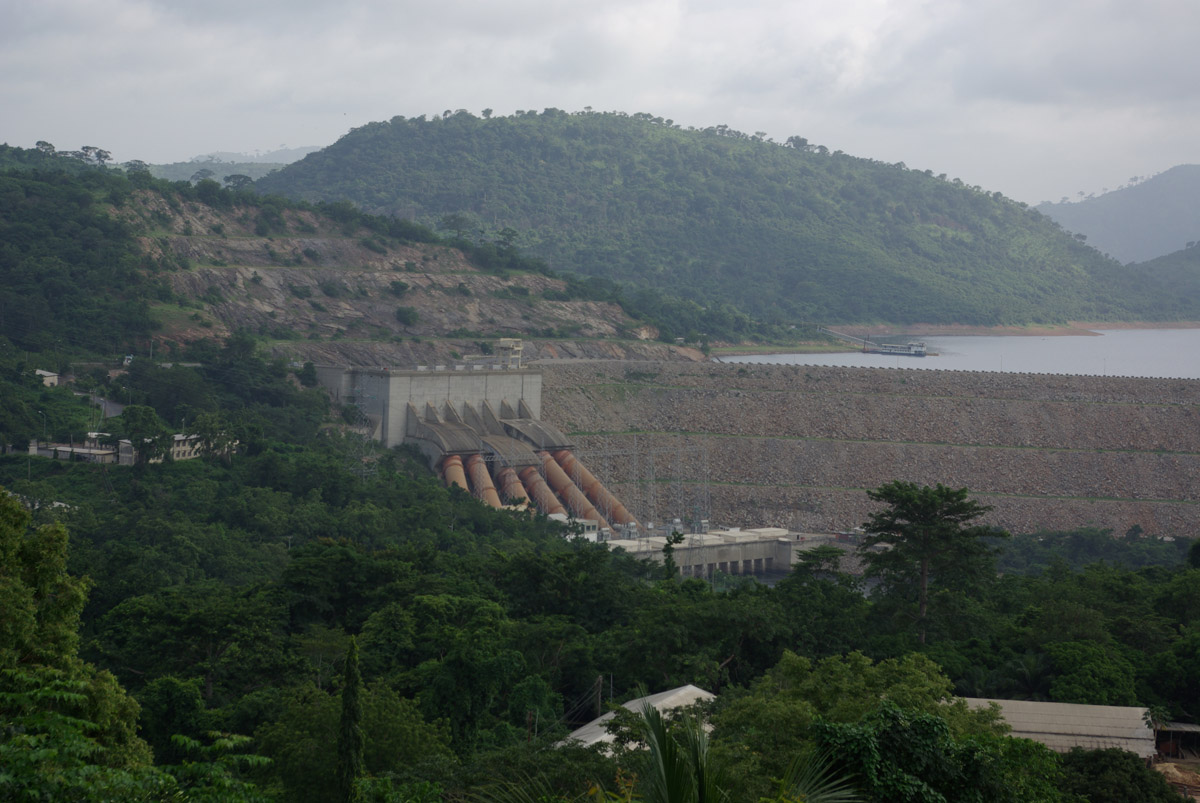
- Akosombo Dam in Eastern Region as seen from the Volta Hotel

- Asuogyaman District logo
- Nickname: Dam City
- Location of Akosombo in Eastern Region, Ghana
- Coordinates: 06°18′00″N 00°03′00″E
- Country: Ghana
- Region: Eastern Region
- District: Asuogyaman District
- Elevation: 151 m (495 ft)
- Time zone: GMT
  - Summer (DST): GMT

Akosombo is a small town in the south of the Asuogyaman District, Eastern Region, Ghana with notable street names of some African countries and cities such as Ghana, Congo, Namibia, Lagos-town, and Freetown. It is occupied by people of diverse ethnic backgrounds, like the Akans, Ewe, Krobo and other ethnic groups. Akosombo is north of the Adomi Bridge at Atimpoku, which is a 3 to 5 minute drive away.

== Akosombo Dam ==
The Ghanaian town of Akosombo is the site of the Akosombo Dam. The capital of Asuogyaman District, Atimpoku, is very close by.

== Gallery ==
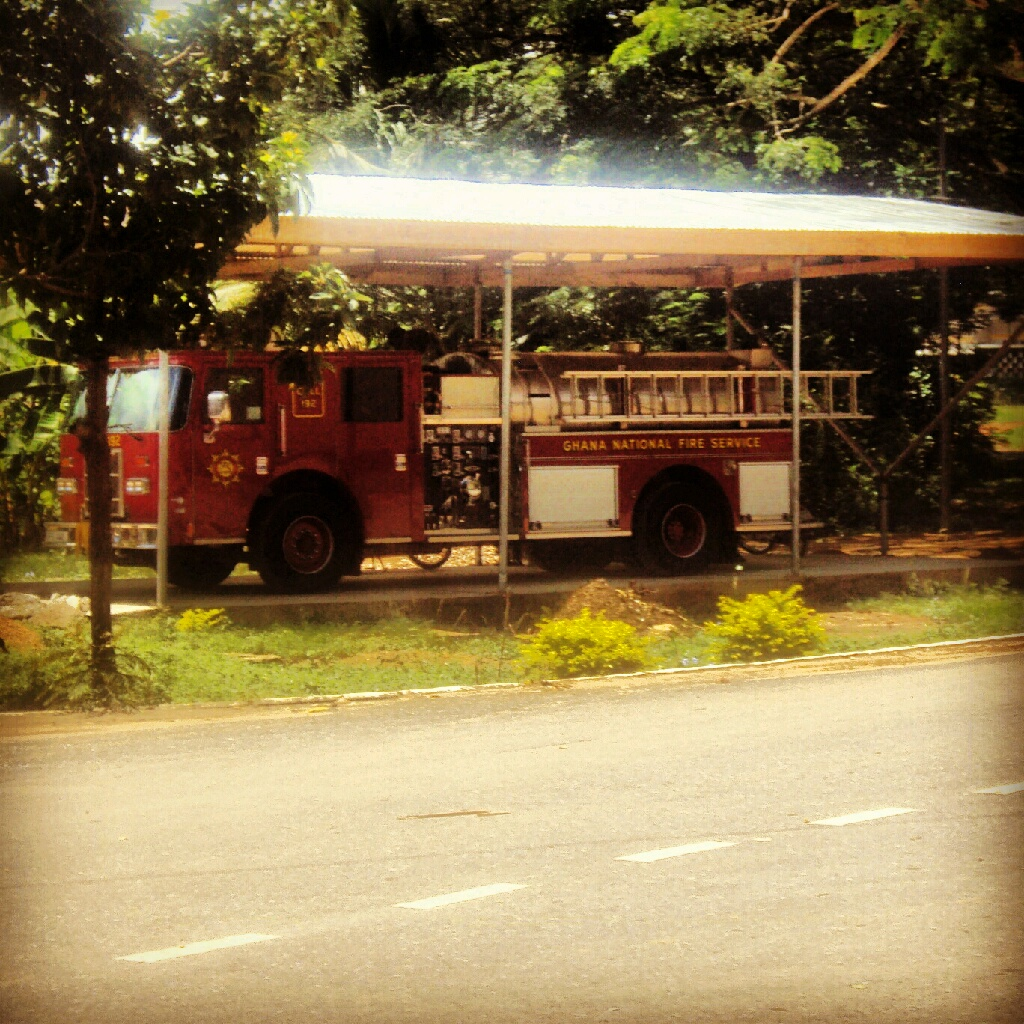
A fire truck parked at the Akosombo Fire Service Station

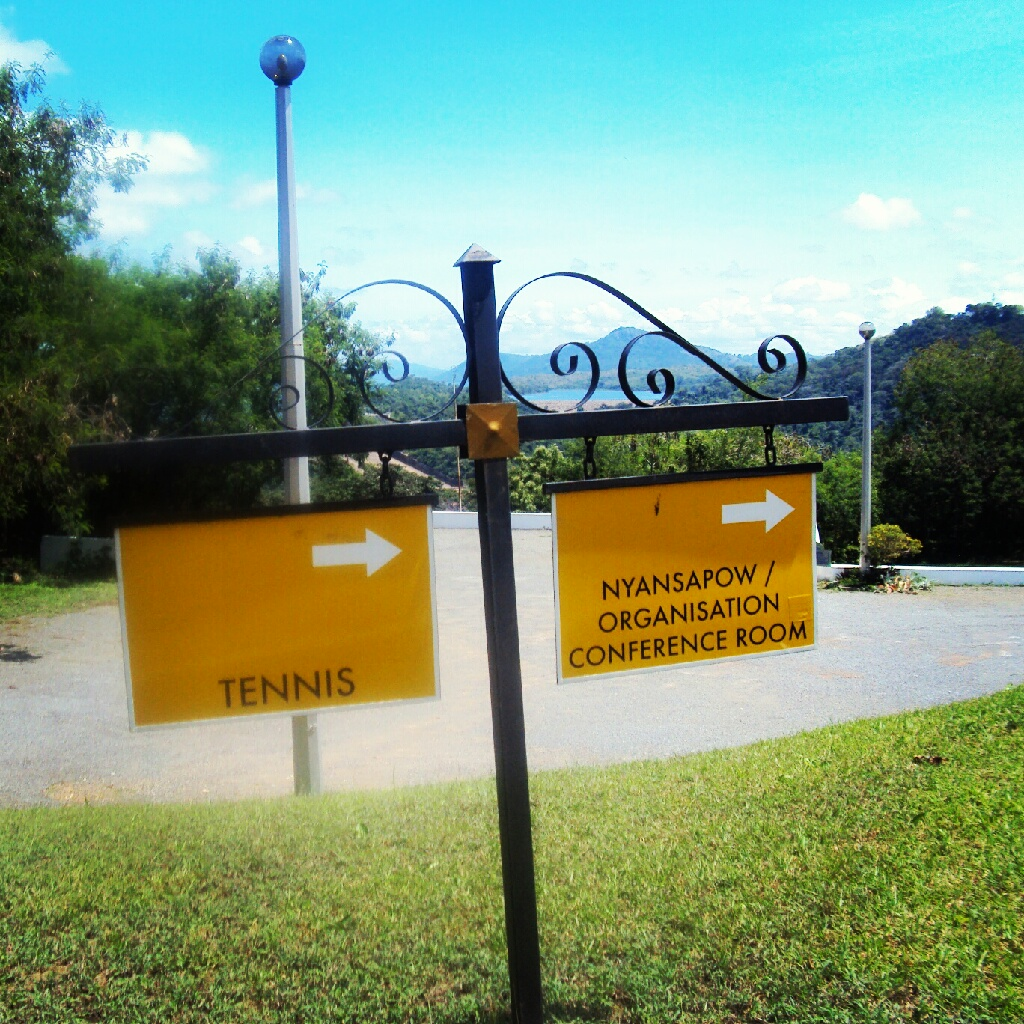
Volta Hotel signpost

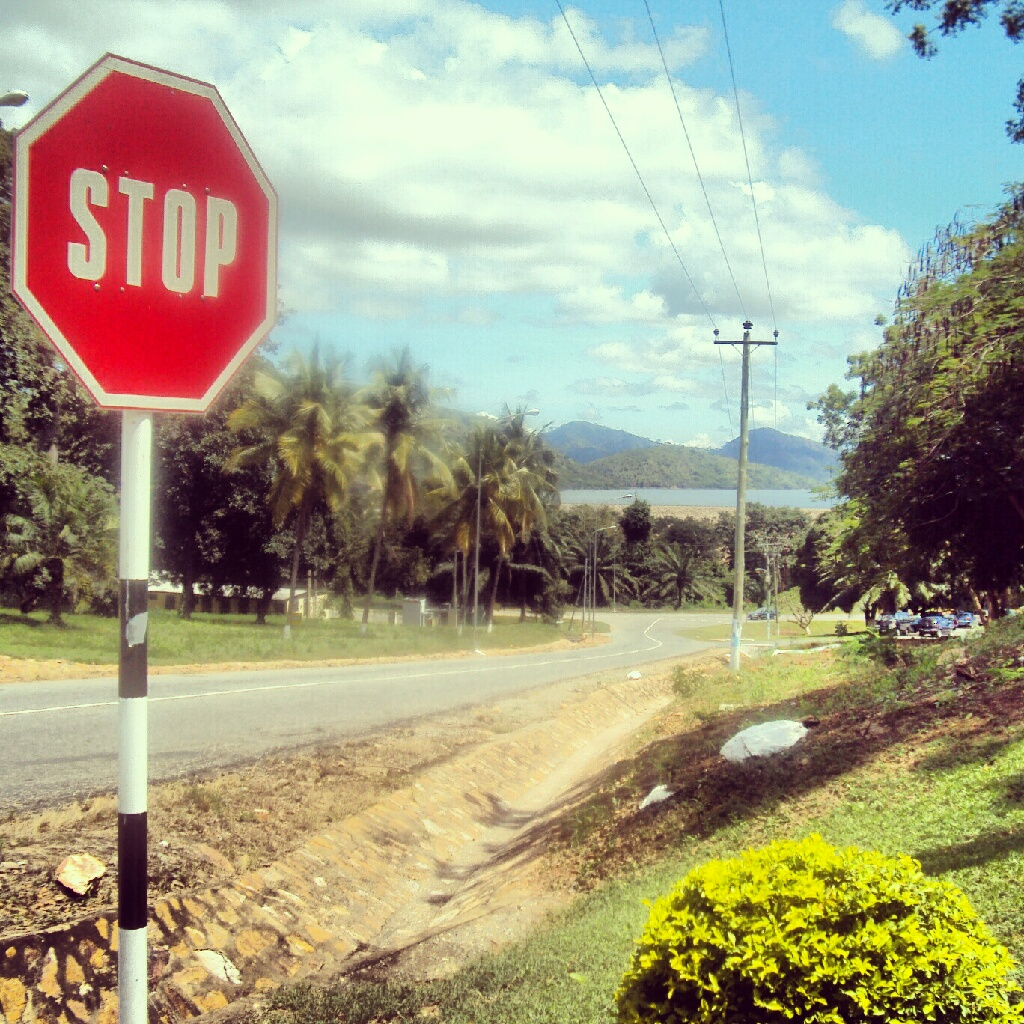
Part of the Akosombo township

== Akosombo Railway Station ==
An Akosombo Railway Station (Akosombo Rail transport) is being prepared for construction.
