= Akosombo Dam =

Dam in Ghana

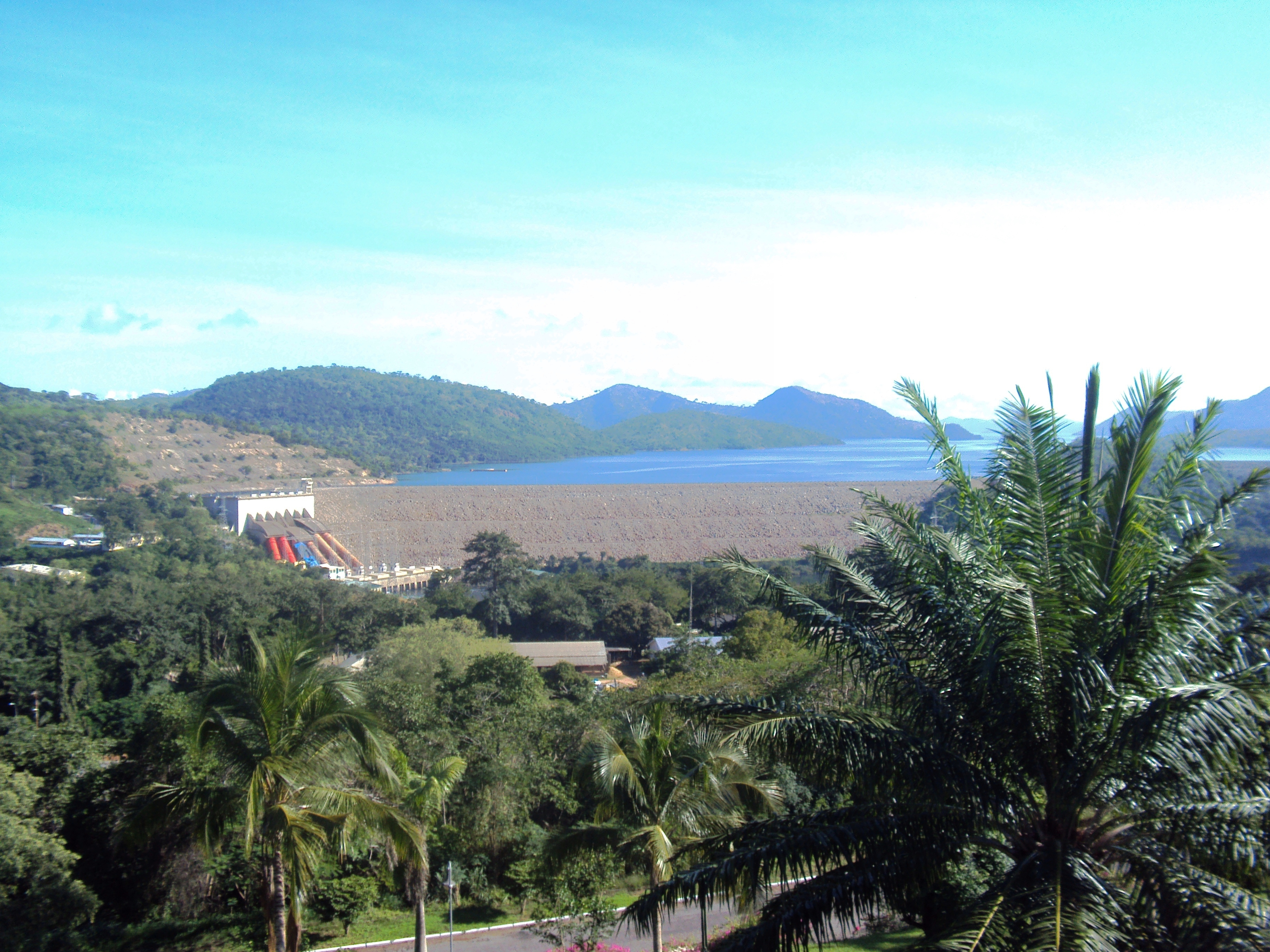
- Akosombo Dam as seen from the Volta Hotel

- Location of the Akosombo Dam in Ghana
- Location: Akosombo, Ghana
- Coordinates: 6°17′59″N 0°3′34″E
- Status: Operational
- Construction began: 1961
- Opening date: 1965
- Construction cost: £130 million
- Owner: Volta River Authority

Dam and spillways
- Type of dam: Embankment, rock-fill
- Impounds: Volta River
- Height (foundation): 114 m (374 ft)
- Length: 660 m (2,170 ft)
- Width (base): 366 m (1,201 ft)
- Dam volume: 7,900,000 m^{3} (280,000,000 cu ft)
- Spillways: Twin gate-controlled
- Spillway capacity: 34,000 m^{3}/s (1,200,000 cu ft/s)

Reservoir
- Creates: Lake Volta
- Total capacity: 148 km^{3} (120,000,000 acre⋅ft)
- Surface area: 8,502 km^{2} (3,283 sq mi)
- Maximum length: 400 km (250 mi)

Power Station
- Hydraulic head: 68.8 m (226 ft) (max)
- Turbines: 6 x 170 MW (230,000 hp) Francis-type
- Installed capacity: 1,038 MW (1,392,000 hp)
- Website www.vra.com/our_mandate/akosombo_hydro_plant.php

The Akosombo Dam, also known as the Volta Dam, is a hydroelectric dam on the Volta River in southeastern Ghana in the Akosombo gorge and part of the Volta River Authority. The construction of the dam flooded part of the Volta River Basin and led to the subsequent creation of Lake Volta. It covers 8,502 square kilometres (3,283 sq mi), which is 3.6% of Ghana's land area, making it the largest artificial lake by surface area in the world. With a volume of 148 cubic kilometers, Lake Volta is the world's third-largest man-made lake by volume; the largest being Lake Kariba which contains 185 cubic kilometers of water.

The primary purpose of the Akosombo Dam was to provide electricity for the aluminium industry. The Akosombo Dam was called "the largest single investment in the economic development plans of Ghana". The dam is significant for providing the majority of both Togo and Benin's electricity, although the construction of the Adjarala Dam (on Togo's Mono River) hopes to reduce these countries' reliance on imported electricity. The dam's original electrical output was 912 megawatts (1,223,000 hp), which was upgraded to 1,020 megawatts (1,370,000 hp) in a retrofit project that was completed in 2006.

The flooding that created the Lake Volta reservoir displaced many people and had a significant impact on the local environment, including seismic activity that led to coastal erosion; a changed hydrology caused microclimatic changes with less rain and higher temperatures. The soil surrounding the lake is less fertile than the soil under it, and heavy agricultural use has required the use of fertilizers, which in turn has led to eutrophication, which caused, among others, the explosive growth of an invasive weed, Ceratophyllum, that renders water navigation and transportation difficult, and forms a habitat for the vectors of water-borne illnesses such as bilharzia, river blindness and malaria. Resettlement of the displaced inhabitants proved complex and in some cases unsuccessful; traditional farming practices disappeared, and poverty increased.

== Design ==
The dam was conceived in 1915 by geologist Albert Kitson, but no plans were drawn until the 1940s. The development of the Volta River Basin was proposed in 1949, but because funds were insufficient, the American company Volta Aluminum Company (Valco) lent money to Ghana so that the dam could be constructed. President Kwame Nkrumah adopted the Volta River hydropower project and commissioned Australian architect Kenneth Scott to design a residence for him overlooking the dam.

The dam is 660 m (2,170 ft) long and 114 m (374 ft) high, comprising a high rock-fill embankment dam. It has a base width of 366 m (1,201 ft) and a structural volume of 7,900,000 m^{3} (10,300,000 cu yd). The reservoir created by the dam, Lake Volta, has a capacity of 148 km^{3} (120,000,000 acre⋅ft) and a surface area of 8,502 km^{2} (3,283 sq mi). The lake is 400 km (250 mi) long. Maximum lake level is 84.73 m (278.0 ft) and minimum is 73.15 m (240.0 ft). On the east side of the dam are two adjacent spillways that can discharge about 34,000 m^{3}/s (1,200,000 cu ft/s) of water. Each spillway contains six 11.5-metre (38 ft)-wide and 13.7-metre (45 ft)-tall steel floodgates.

The dam's power plant contains six 170-megawatt (230,000 hp) Francis turbines. Each turbine is supplied with water via a 112–116-metre (367–381 ft) long and 7.2-metre (24 ft) diameter penstock with a maximum of 68.8 m (226 ft) of hydraulic head afforded.

The final proposal outlined the building of an aluminum smelter at Tema, a dam constructed at Akosombo to power the smelter, and a network of power lines installed through southern Ghana. The aluminum smelter was expected to eventually provide the revenue necessary for establishing local bauxite mining and refining, which would allow aluminum production without importing foreign alumina. The development of the aluminum industry within Ghana was dependent upon the proposed hydroelectric power. The proposed project's aluminum smelter was overseen by the American company Kaiser Aluminum and is operated by Valco. The smelter received its financial investment from Valco shareholders, with the support of the Export-Import Bank of the United States. However, Valco did not invest without first requiring assurances from Ghana's government, such as company exemptions from taxes on trade and discounted purchases of electricity. The estimated total cost of the project was $258 million.

== Construction ==
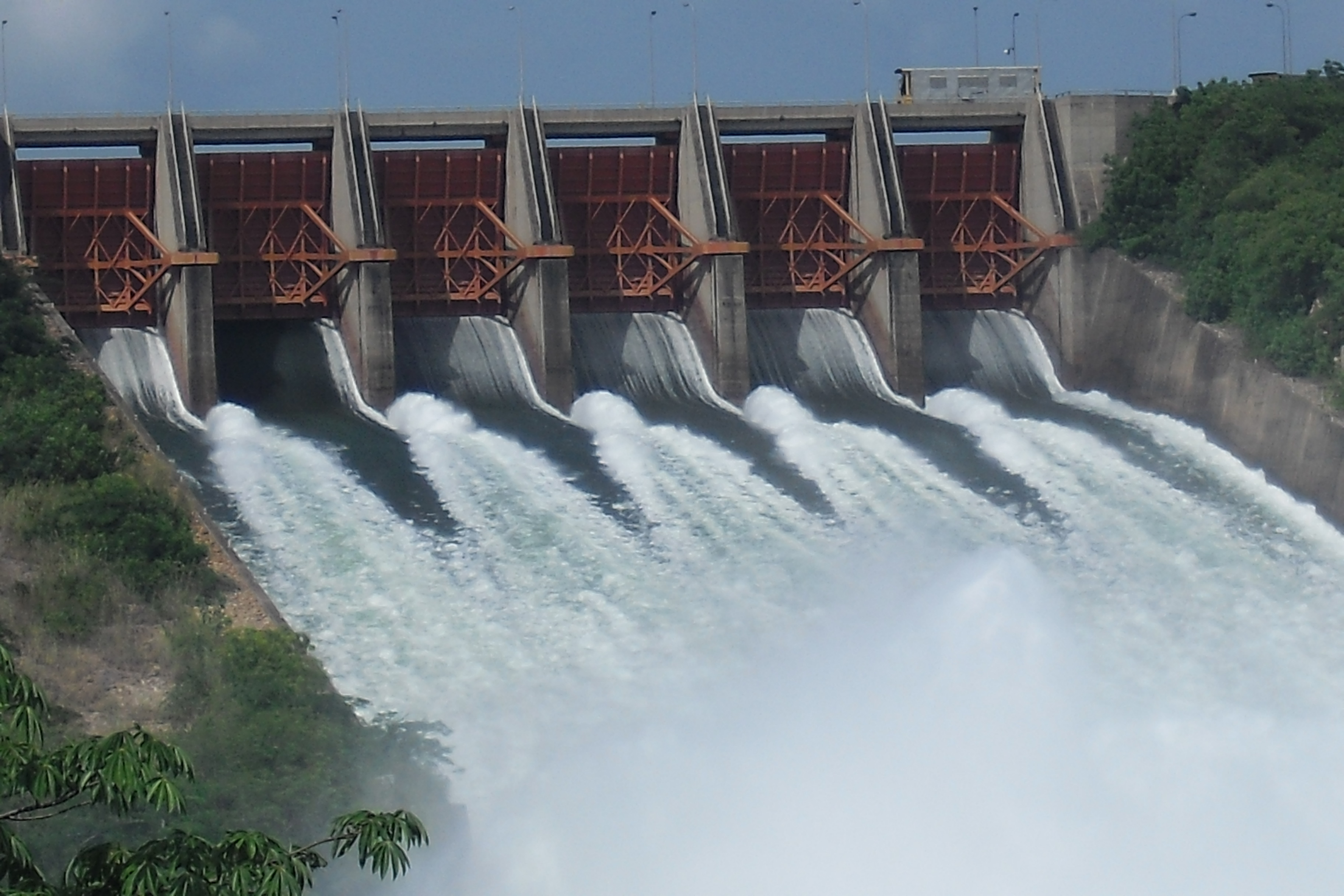
Akosombo dam with open spillways

In May 1960, the Ghana government called for tenders for construction of the hydroelectric dam. In 1961, an Italian consortium, Impregilo which had just completed the Kariba Dam, won the contract. In 1961, the Volta River Authority (VRA) was established by Ghana's Parliament through the passage of the Volta River Development Act. The VRA's fundamental operations were structured by six Board members and Nkrumah as chairman. The VRA's primary task is to manage the development of the Volta River Basin, which included the construction and supervision of the dam, the power station and the power transmission network. The VRA is responsible for the reservoir impounded by the dam, fishing within the lake, lake transportation and communication, and the welfare of those surrounding the lake.

The dam was built between 1961 and 1965. Its development was undertaken by the Ghanaian government and funded 25% by the International Bank for Reconstruction and Development of the World Bank, the United States, and the United Kingdom. Impreglio carried out the dredging of the river bed and dewatering of the channel, and completed the dam a month earlier than scheduled despite flooding of the Volta River in 1963 which delayed work over three months. Between 1961 and 1966, 28 workers of Impregilo died during the construction of the dam. Memorials in Akosombo township and St. Barbara Catholic Church have been put up in their honor.

The construction of the Akosombo Dam resulted in the flooding of part of the Volta River Basin and its upstream fields, and in the creation of Lake Volta which covers 3.6% of Ghana's total land area. Lake Volta was formed between 1962 and 1966 and necessitated the relocation of about 80,000 people, who represented 1% of the population. People of 700 villages were relocated into 52 resettlement villages two years prior to the dam's completion; the resettlement program was under the direction of the VRA. Two percent of the resettlement population were riparian fishers, and most were subsistence farmers. The Eastern Region of Ghana and the populations incorporated within its districts were most subject to the project's effects.

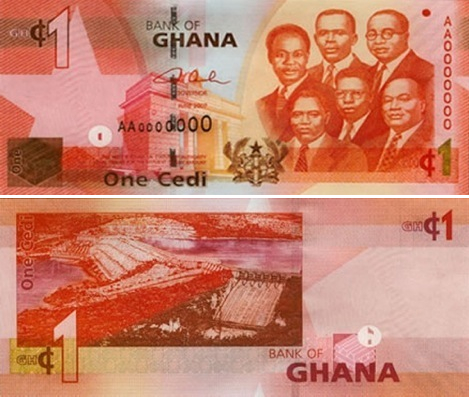
Akosombo Dam on the reverse of a 2007 1 Cedi specimen banknote

== Power generation ==
The dam provides electricity to Ghana and its neighboring West African countries, including Togo and Benin. Initially 20% of Akosombo Dam's electric output (serving 70% of national demand) was provided to Ghanaians in the form of electricity, the remaining 80% was generated for Valco. The Ghana government was compelled, by contract, to pay for over 50% of the cost of Akosombo's construction, but the country was allowed only 20% of the power generated. Some commentators are concerned that this is an example of neocolonialism. In recent years the production from the Valco plant has declined allowing capacity at Akosombo to be used to service growing domestic demand.

Initially, the dam's power production capabilities greatly exceeded actual demand; while the demand since the dam's inception has resulted in the doubling of hydropower production. Ghana's industrial and economic expansion triggered higher demand for power, beyond the Akosombo's power plant capabilities. By 1981, a smaller dam was built at Kpong, downstream from Akosombo, upgrades to Akosombo became necessary to maintain hydropower output.

Increasing demands for power exceed what can be provided by the current infrastructure. Power demands, along with unforeseen environmental trends, have resulted in rolling blackouts and major power outages. An overall trend of lower lake levels has been observed, sometimes below the level required for operation of the generators.

In the beginning of 2007, concerns were expressed over the electricity supply from the dam because of low water levels in the Lake Volta reservoir. During the latter half of 2007, much of this concern abated when heavy rain fell in the catchment area of Volta River. In 2010, the highest-ever water level was recorded at the dam. This necessitated the opening of the flood gates at a reservoir elevation of 84.45 m (277 ft) and, for several weeks, water was spilled from the lake, causing some flooding downstream.

== Impacts ==
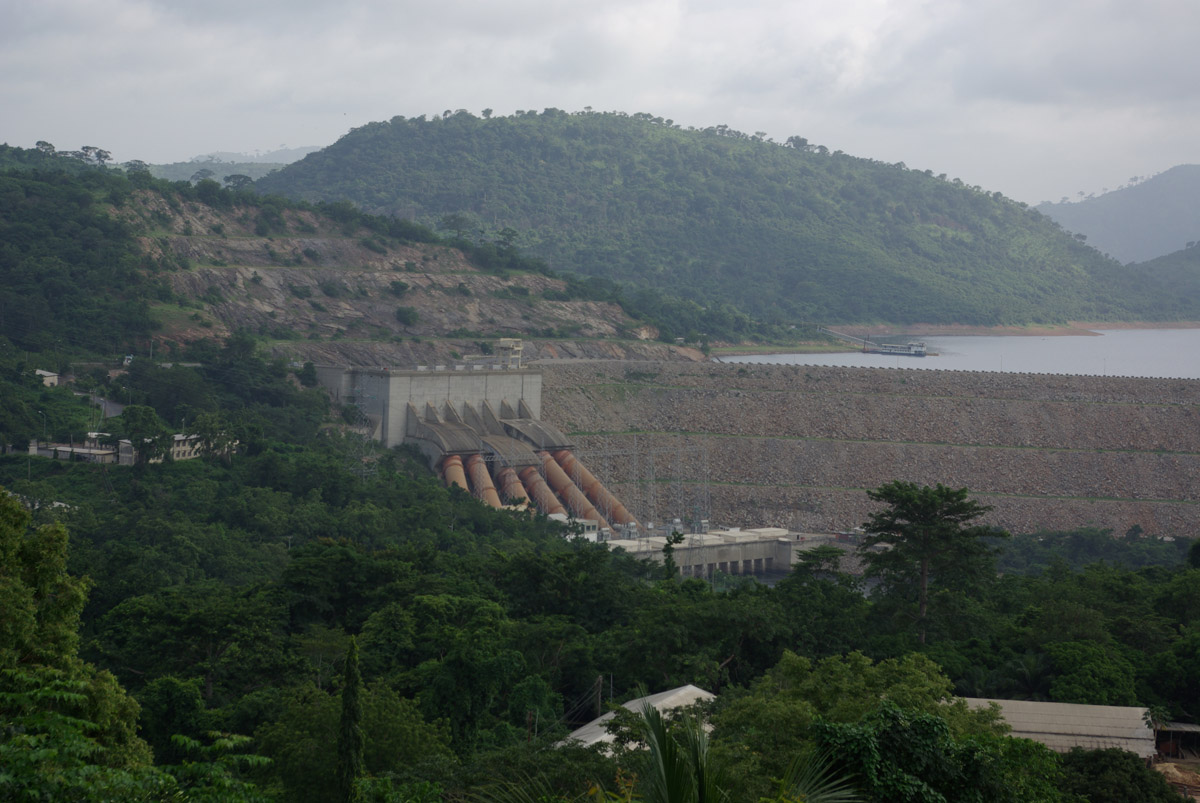
The hydroelectric power plant on Lake Volta

The Akosombo Dam benefited some industrial and economic activities from the addition of lake transportation, increased fishing, new farming activities along the shoreline, and tourism.

=== Biological habitat ===
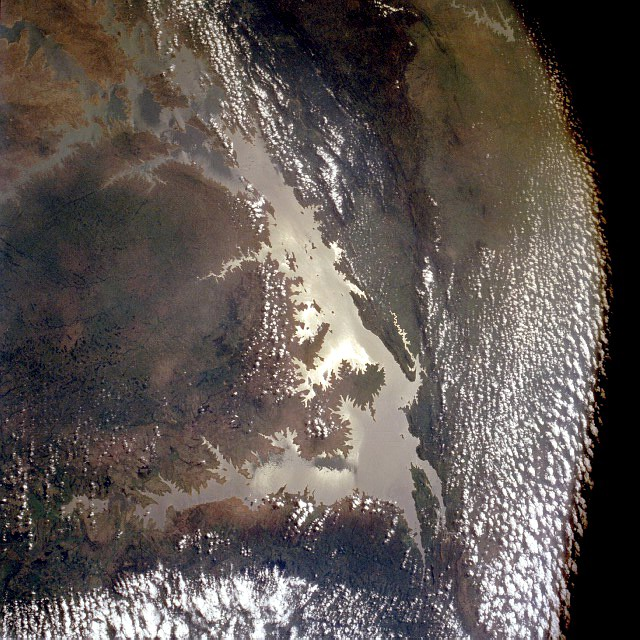
Lake Volta from space

In the time following the construction of the dam, there has been a steady decline in agricultural productivity along the lake and the associated tributaries. The land surrounding Lake Volta is not nearly as fertile as the formerly cultivated land residing underneath the lake, and heavy agricultural activity has since exhausted the already inadequate soils. Downstream agricultural systems are losing soil fertility without the periodic floods that brought nutrients to the soil before the natural river flow was halted by the dam. The growth of commercially intensive agriculture has produced a rise in fertilizer run-off into the river. This, along with run-off from nearby cattle stocks and sewage pollution, has caused eutrophication of the river waters. The nutrient enrichment, in combination with the low water movement, has allowed for the invasion of aquatic weeds (Ceratophyllum). These weeds have become a formidable challenge to water navigation and transportation.

=== Human welfare ===
The presence of Ceratophyllum along the lake and within the tributaries has resulted in even greater detriment to local human health. The weeds provide the necessary habitat for black-fly, mosquitoes and snails, which are the vectors of water-borne illnesses such as bilharzia, river blindness and malaria. Since the installation of the dam, these diseases have increased markedly. In particular, resettlement villages have shown an increase in disease prevalence since the establishment of Lake Volta, and a village's likelihood of infection corresponds to its proximity to the lake. Children and fishermen have been especially hard hit by this rise of disease prevalence. Additionally, the degradation of aquatic habitat has resulted in the decline of shrimp and clam populations. The physical health of local communities has been diminished from this loss of shellfish populations, as they provided an essential source of dietary protein. Likewise, the rural and industrial economies have experienced financial losses associated with the decimation of river aquaculture.

Increased human migration within the area has been driven by poverty and unfavorable resettlement conditions. This migration exacerbated the spread of HIV and has led to its heightened prevalence within Volta Basin communities. The districts of Manya Krobo and Yilo Krobo, which lie within the southwest portion of the Volta Basin, are predominantly indigenous communities and they have a disproportionate prevalence of HIV, showing how local factors have impacted these districts. Commercial sex work blossomed in response to the thousands of male workers that were in the area to build the dam. Ten percent of the females of child-bearing age from these two districts migrated out of their districts during this time. In 1986, "90% of AIDS victims in Ghana were women, and 96% of them had recently lived outside the country".

=== Socioeconomics ===
The loss of land experienced by the 80,000 people forcibly relocated meant the loss of their primary economic activities from fishing and agriculture, loss of their homes, loss of their family grave sites, loss of community stability, and the eventual loss of important social values. The resettlement program demonstrated the social complexities involved in establishing "socially cohesive and integrated" communities. Insufficient planning resulted in the relocation of communities into areas that did not suit their former way of life and traditions. The loss of the naturally fertile soils beneath Lake Volta impacted traditional farming practices. The poor living conditions provided within the resettlement villages is evident from the reductions in population since resettlement. One resettlement village in particular experienced a greater than 50% population reduction in the 23 years following relocation. Increased economic risks and experiences of poverty are associated with those communities most impacted by the Volta River's development. The extensive human migration and degradation of natural resources within the Volta-basin area are caused by poverty in conjunction with population pressure.

=== Physical environment ===
Reservoir-induced seismicity has been recorded because of the crustal re-adjustments from the added weight of the water within Lake Volta. There is an eastward shift of the river's mouth from the changes to the river's delta, and this has led to continuing coastal erosion. The changes in the river hydrology have altered the local heat budget which has caused microclimatic changes such as decreasing rain and higher mean monthly temperatures. All of these larger scale environmental impacts compound the problems surrounding disruptions to local economic activities and the associated difficult human welfare conditions. A case study by the International Federation of Surveyors indicated that the dam has had a significant impact on the shoreline erosion of the barrier separating the Keta Lagoon from the sea. Dr. Isaac Boateng has calculated the reduction of fluvial sediment as being from 71 million cubic metres per year to as little as 7 million cubic metres per year.

== Spillage ==
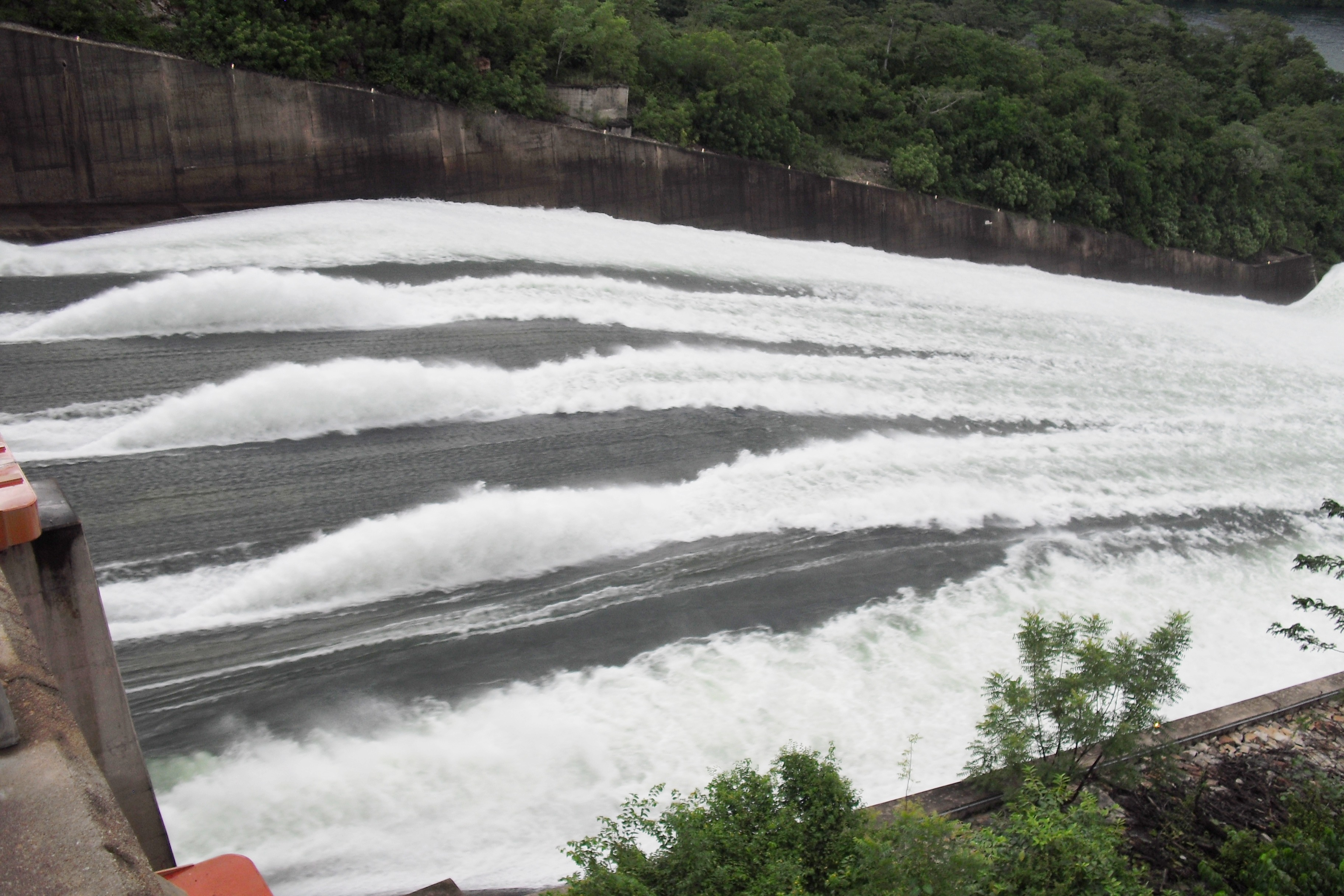
Akosombo Dam Spillage

Until 2023, the last time Akosombo dam community experienced flooding as a result of controlled spillage of the dam was in 2010.

On 15 September 2023, the Volta River Authority (VRA) initiated a controlled spillage of water from the Akosombo and Kpong dams situated in the Eastern Region. This controlled spillage led to flooding in communities located along the lower Volta Basin leading to power interruptions. Many victims lost their belongings and livelihood due to the floods. The losses included farmlands, houses and properties which were destroyed by the floods.

== See also ==
- Adomi Bridge
- Bui Dam
