= 2010 Sahel famine =

Famine affecting Africa's Sahel & Senegal river area

Meteorological history
- Formed: 3 April
- Dissipated: 18 September

Drought

Overall effects
- Fatalities: 9 confirmed, 42 indirectly, 20 unconfirmed
- Areas affected: Sahel

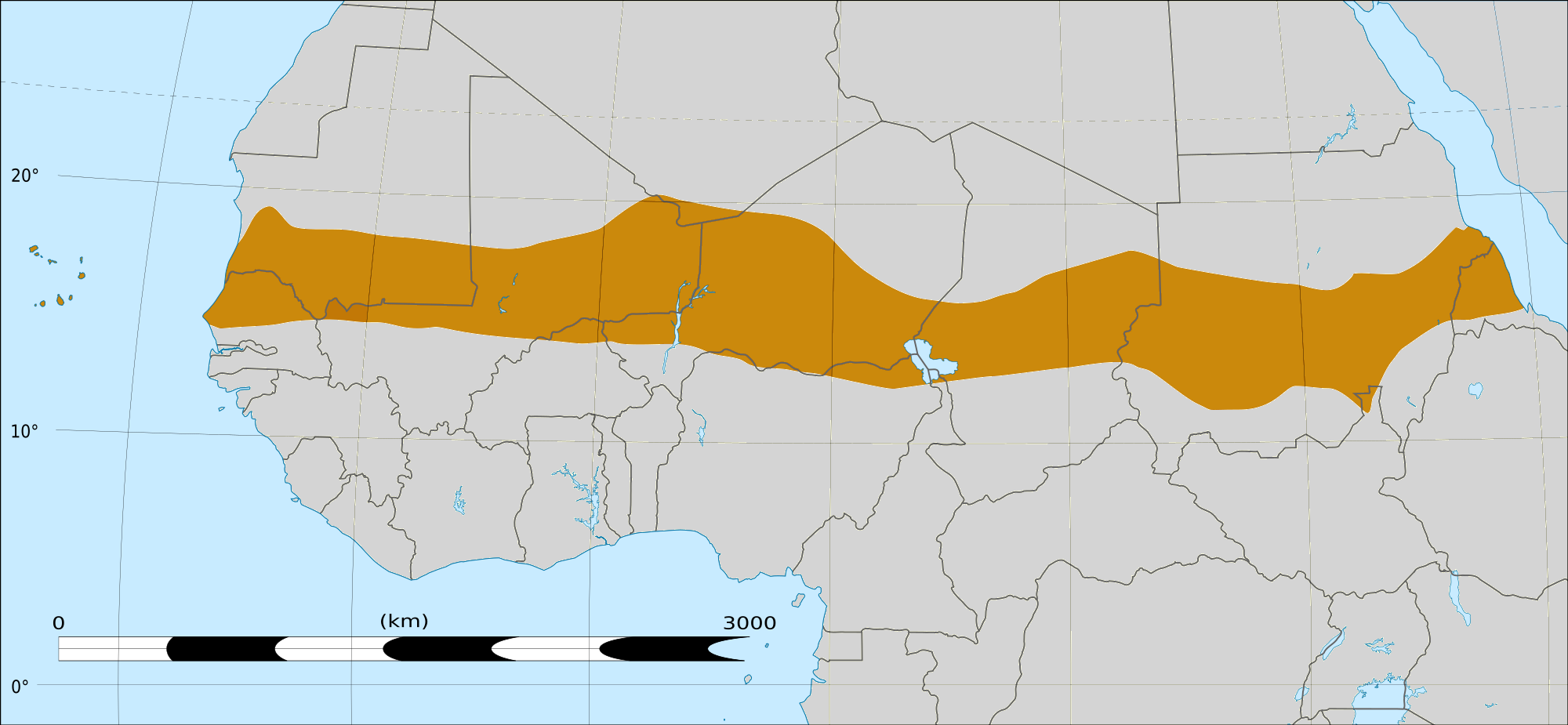
The Sahel forms a belt up to 1000 km wide, spanning Africa from the Atlantic Ocean to the Red Sea.

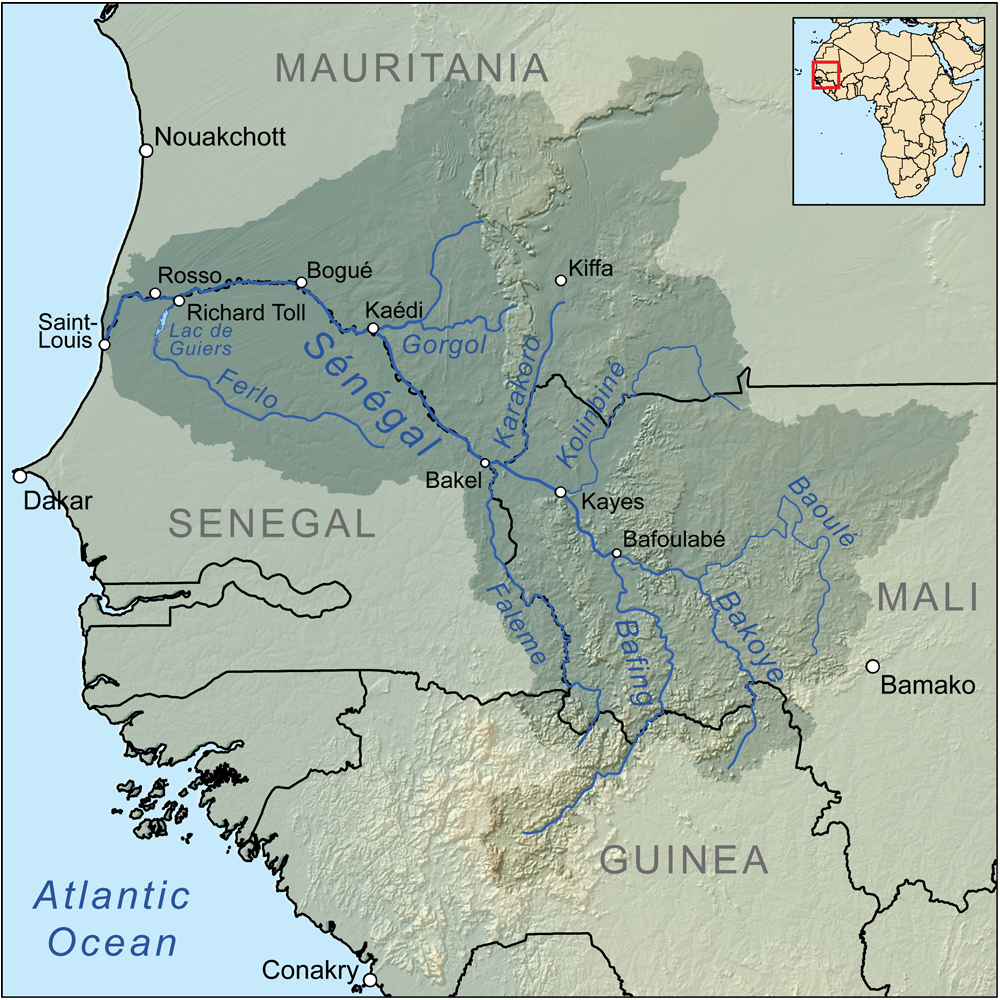
A map of the Sénégal River drainage basin.

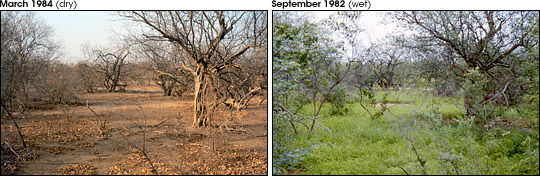
The vegetation in the Sahel follows seasonal rainfall. In March, during the dry season, rainfall and lush vegetation don't extend north of the Gulf of Guinea. September brings rain and vegetation into the Sahel as far north as the northern edge of Lake Chad. Photographs from Senegal show the difference in vegetation between the dry (left) and wet (right) seasons.

A large-scale, drought-induced famine occurred in Africa's Sahel region and many parts of the neighbouring Sénégal River Area from February to August 2010. It is one of many famines to have hit the region in recent times.

The Sahel is the ecoclimatic and biogeographic zone of transition between the Sahara desert in the north of Africa and the Sudanian savannas in the south, covering an area of 3,053,200 square kilometres. It is a transitional ecoregion of semi-arid grasslands, savannas, steppes, and thorn shrublands.

The neighbouring Sénégal River Area contains various vegetation types and covers parts or all of Mauritania, Mali, Senegal and Guinea. It has also had very low rainfall over the last year according to the UN, NGOs and the Senegal River Basin Development Authority. Sudan set a new temperature record of 49.7 °C (121.3 °F) on 22 June, in the town of Dongola.

== Overview ==
Famine and food shortages were present in the following Sahelian countries during 2010 after heavy rains hit the region in late 2009, followed by a heat wave: Sudan, the Niger, northern Nigeria, northern Cameroon, Chad, Senegal, Burkina Faso, Mauritania, Mali, as well as in parts of the neighbouring Sénégal River Area.

In December 2009, both USAID and several NGOs predicted an increased food insecurity situation in more of the southern districts of Mali as compared to the same time the previous year.

== Possible causes ==
More than a century of rainfall data in the Sahel show an unusually wet period from 1950 until 1970 (positive index values), followed by extremely dry years from 1970 to 1990 (negative index values). From 1990 until present rainfall returned to levels slightly below the 1898–1993 average, but year-to-year variability remains high.

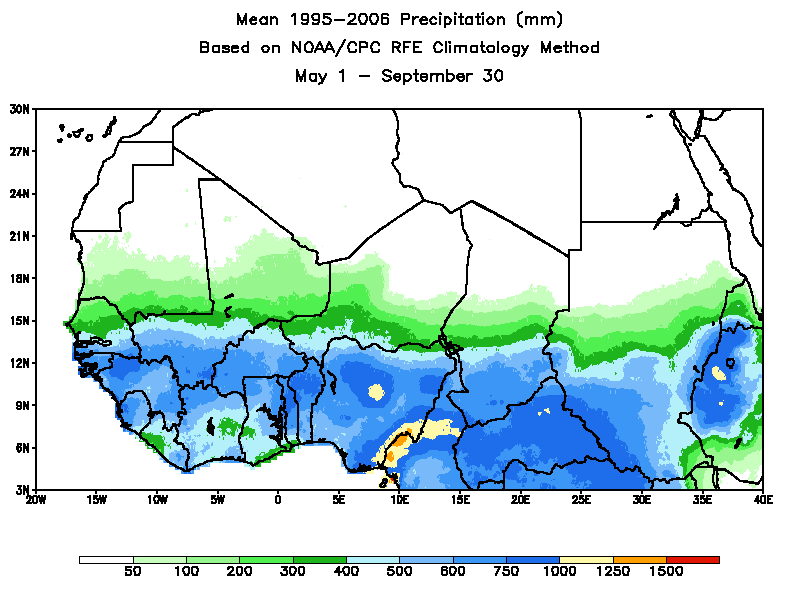
Map showing mean rainfall amount (mm) for the monsoon season (1 May – 30 September) in West Africa. Period 1995–2006. Based on NOAA/CPC Climatology Method Rainfall Estimates. Africa Rainfall Climatology (CPC ARC) Series.

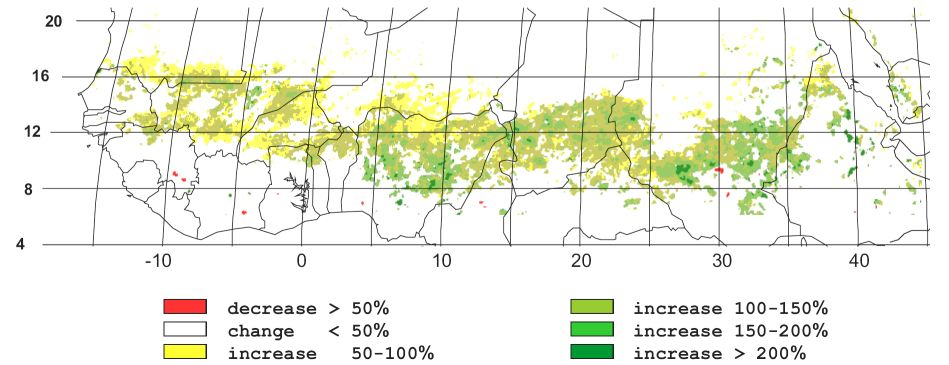
Recent "Greening" of the Sahel: The results of trend analysis of time series over the Sahel region of seasonally integrated NDVI using NOAA AVHRR NDVI-data from 1982 to 1999.

=== Environmental problems ===
The Western donor nations once theorised that the drought in the Sahel primarily was caused by humans over-using natural resources in the region through overgrazing, deforestation and poor land management. In the late 1990s, climate model studies suggested that large-scale climate changes were also triggers for the drought.

In the early 2000s, after the phenomenon of global dimming was discovered, some speculatively suggested, that the drought was likely caused by air pollution generated in Eurasia and North America. The pollution changed the properties of clouds over the Atlantic Ocean, disturbing the monsoons and shifting the tropical rains southwards. Global dimming, the blocking of sunlight by man-made particulates, has been identified as one culprit for a decades-long drought across sub-Saharan Africa.

A 2006 study by NOAA scientists Rong Zhang and Thomas L. Delworth suggests that the Atlantic Multidecadal Oscillation/(MAO) plays a leading role. An AMO warm phase strengthens the summer rainfall over Sahel, while a cold phase reduces it. The AMO entered a warm phase in 1995 and, by assuming the presence of a theoretical 70-year cycle (following peaks in ≈1880 and ≈1950), it would probably peak around about 2020.

The Sahel's farmers have been largely cleared of blame for the 19th century's Sahel droughts. The Sahel region's rains in the 1930s and 1940s were caused by the recent warming of the Indian Ocean, rather than by over-farming causing environmental degradation as previously assumed, according to a new joint Scidev/UN study. With both a 3.5 C. rise in the Niger's temperature over the last decade and with irrigated land accounting for only 0.1% of the Niger's inhabitable land, regular famine crisis is inevitable in most years. Acute water shortages, which are common in the region's harsh weather, make irrigation systems all the more important for the local farmers.

=== The Demise of Lake Chad ===
The Lake Chad basin straddles the borders of both Niger, Nigeria, Cameroon and Chad. The lake is situated 281 metres (922 ft) above sea level and is diminishing over time due to lack of rain water and major rivers running into it. According to the UN the marshy lake shrank as much as by 95% from about 1963 to 1998 yet they also state that "The 2007 (satellite) image shows significant improvement over previous years". Lake Chad is economically important, providing water to more than 20 million people living in the four countries that surround it (Chad, Cameroon, Niger, and Nigeria) on the edge of the Sahara Desert. The plant Typha Australis (or the big cattail) is cutting off water supplies in the Lake Chad Basin, and has slashed available water supplies in the Chad's region. The only protected area is Lake Chad Game Reserve, which covers half of the area next to the lake that belongs to Nigeria. The whole lake has been declared a Ramsar site of international importance.

Lake Chad's role in the Sahel famine has attracted attention partly due to the desertification that is increasingly claiming a huge swath not just of the Sahel region but also the entire African continent. According to a United Nations environment program, in 2002, this phenomenon, which is a process where the soil loses the capacity to retain necessary moisture, has covered nearly half of Africa. It was revealed that the Sahel region is one of the areas that are worst affected.

The problem is also highlighted by the discovery of fossil pollens indicating that, in ancient times, the shores of Lake Chad supported a well-watered savanna, which contributed to a lesser level of aridity in the Sahel area. It was found that around 3,000 B.C., the Sahel averaged 650 millimetres of rainfall a year compared to an average of 350 millimetres recorded today. Given the issue of desertification, even if Lake Chad was not directly a cause of the famine, its potential demise is expected to further aggravate the problem. There are studies that show that the incidence of famine is reportedly related to the delicate seasonal variations in the Intertropical Convergence Zone (ITCZ).

The shrinking of Lake Chad is blamed on the long droughts as well as the uptick in human activities such as the use of the lake's water for irrigation, the destruction of wooded areas for firewood, and the shift from the cultivation of corn and wheat to rice as the staple crop.

==== The Ubangi River diversion proposal ====
In the 1960s, a plan was proposed to divert the Ubangi River into Lake Chad. The copious amount of water from the Ubangi would revitalise the dying Lake Chad and provide livelihood in fishing and enhanced agriculture to tens of millions of central Africans and Sahelians. Inter-basin water transfer schemes were proposed in the 1980s and 1990s by Nigerian engineer J. Umolu (ZCN Scheme) and Italian firm Bonifica (Transaqua Scheme). In 1994, the Lake Chad Basin Commission (LCBC) proposed a similar project and at a March 2008 Summit, the Heads of State of the LCBC member countries committed to the diversion project. In April 2008, the LCBC advertised a request for proposals for a World Bank-funded feasibility study.

=== The possible effects of cash crops ===
Cotton and groundnuts are two of Chad's four major cash crops. Mali's major cash crops are peanuts and cotton. Mali's cotton production has grown from 500,000 tonnes in 1997 to a record 635,000 tonnes in 2003, which has pleased the African Association of Cotton Producers, but has also led to a claim that cash crops are being put before food and fodder crops in Mali, Burkina Faso and Chad. Cassava production has fallen slightly in Burkina Faso since 2007, relative to cotton output. Their cash crops are cotton, groundnuts, shea nuts, and sesame. The Sahel's farmers are largely cleared of blame for the 20th century's Sahel droughts and this is supported by the position that several of the cash crops in the Sahel region have desirable ecological effects such as the tree crops and the legumes, which help prevent the process of desertification. However, there is the enduring question of whether cash crops like cotton are more important than food plants like wheat and casava. This issue persists as studies cite that the famine is linked to the direct entitlement failure that affected people's access to food.

=== Over-population ===
Many of the world's countries, including many in Sub-saharan Africa, the Middle East and Southeast Asia, have seen a sharp rise in population since the end of the Cold War. The fear is that high population numbers are putting further strain on natural resources, food supplies, fuel supplies, employment, housing, etc.; in some of the less fortunate countries. The population of Chad has, for example, ultimately grown from 6,279,921 in 1993 to 10,329,208 in 2009, further straining its resources. Nigeria is witnessing a similar growth in population, strained resources and a possible over-population problem in the near future.

The situation was most acute in northern, western and central Africa. Refugees from places like the Sudan have helped further strain the resources of neighbouring states like the Chad and Egypt. The nation is also host to roughly 255,000 refugees from Sudan's Darfur region, and about 77,000 refugees from the Central African Republic, whilst approximately 188,000 Chadians have been displaced by their own civil war and famines, have either fled to either the Sudan, the Niger or, more recently, Libya.

Example nation	1st Population total.	2nd Population total.	3rd Population total.	4th Population total.	5th Population total.	Life expectancy in years.	Total population growth from 1965, 6 or 1967 to 2008, 9 or 10.
Sudan**	14,355,000 (1967)**	25,204,000 (1990)**	27,361,000 (1994)**	38,114,160 (2003)**	42,272,000 (2008)**	50 (2008)**	27,917,000**
Chad	3,410,000 (1967)	5,679,000 (1990)	6,183,000 (1994)	9,253,493 (2003)	10,329,208 (2009)	47 (2008)	6,919,205
Niger	3,546,000 (1967)	7,732,000 (1990)	8,846,000 (1994)	10,790,352 (2001)	15,306,252 (2009)	44 (2008)	11,760,252
Nigeria	61,450,000 (1967)	88,500,000 (1990)	108,467,000 (1994)	129,934,911 (2002)	158,259,000 (2008)	47 (2008)	96,809,000
Mali	4,745,000 (1967)	8,156,000 (1990),	10,462,000 (1994)	11,340,480 (2002)	14,517,176 (2010).	50 (2008)	9,772,176
Mauritania	1,050,000 (1967)	2,025,000 (1990)	2,211,000 (1994)	2,667,859 (2003)	3,291,000 (2009)	54 (2008)	2,241,000
Senegal	3,607,000 (1967)	7,327,000 (1990)	8,102,000 (1994)	9,967,215 (2002)	13,711,597 (2009)	57 (2008)	10,104,597
Gambia	343,000 (1967)	861,000 (1990)	1,081,000 (1994)	1,367,124 (2000)	1,705,000 (2008)	55 (2008)	1,362,000
Algeria	11,833,126 (1966)	25,012,000 (1990)	27,325,000 (1994)	32,818,500 (2003)	34,895,000 (2008)	74 (2008)	23,061,874
Egypt	30,083,419 (1966)	53,153,000 (1990)	58,326,000 (1994)	70,712,345 (2003)	79,089,650 (2008)	72 (2008)	49,006,231
UK (as a Western comparison)	55,068,000 (1966)	57,411,000 (1990)	58,091,000 (1994)	58,789,194 (2002)	62,008,048(2011)	79(2008)	6,973,708
Japan*** (as a Western comparison)	98,274,961 (1965)	123,537,000 (1990)	124,961,000 (1994)	127,333,002 (2002)	127,420,000 (2010)	82 (2008)	29,058,041
Ryukyu Islands*** (as a Western comparison)	934,176 (1965)	-	-	-	-	-	-
**=Split into the nations of Sudan and Southern Sudan during 2011.
***=Merged in 1972.

=== Aid workers being driven off by kidnappers ===
On 25 August a French aid worker was kidnapped in Chad. The kidnapping of foreigners along the Chad/Darfur border became more frequent in 2009. A French NGO worker was taken and then murdered on 29 October 2009, and an unidentified Red Cross worker was captured on 10 November 2009. Many NGOs and charities have begun to restrict the areas covered by their aid work in Niger, Chad, and Sudan due to the ever-present risk of bandits and kidnappers. The organisations are thus pulling out in fear of their workers' lives.

Most international aid agencies have been withdrawing workers from some areas of the Sahel, due to the regional kidnapping crisis. Niger's government spokesman Mahamane Lawali Danda told the BBC that the pullout was a surprise to him since no one had told him or his government that Niger was on the list of dangerous 'kidnapper infested' pariah nations, along with Chad, Darfur and Sudan. Strangely, Mauritania and Mali were not on the list of dangerous nations, despite several al-Qaeda lead kidnappings in both during 2009.

Dates of 2008–2010 kidnapping incidents	The victims' nationalities	The location of the kidnapping	The victims' and kidnappers' fates
19 October 2008	9 Chinese	South Kordofan	All were killed. The Kidnappers were hanged in Sudan.
29 October 2009	1 French	Eastern Chad	Killed in Darfur.
10 November 2009.	1 N/A	Chad.	N/A
26 November 2009	1 French	Northern Mali	N/A
1 December 2009	3 Spanish	Mauritania	Freed. The Malian kidnaper was sentenced to a 12 jail term in Mali.
3 May 2010	1 Malian	Northern Mali	N/A
18 May 2010	2 Sudanese and 1 American	Abu Ajura, South Darfur	Freed.
23 June 2010	2 Germans	Darfur	N/A
? Jul 2010	1 Russian	South Darfur	Freed.
26 July 2010	1 French	Mauritania	Killed in Mali.
14 August 2010	2 Jordanians	Nyala, Darfur	Freed.
25 August 2010	1 French	Chad	N/A
31 August 2010	3 Russians	Nyala, Darfur	N/A
15 September 2010	1 Chinese	The Chadian side of the Chad/Dafur border	Freed
16 September 2010	5 French and 2 N/A	Niger	Currently held captive.

== List of events ==
=== January ===
11 January saw an emerging famine situation in south eastern Sudan according to the UN, NGOs, the EU and various Charities.

The government of Niger says 7,800,000 risk starvation in 2010 as heavy drought and high heat hit Niger, Burkina Faso, Mali, Chad and northern Nigeria on both 27 and 28 January and was estimated to need about $220,000,000 million this year in food and agricultural aid. The EU's ECHO aid department said of signs of food shortages were in Niger and spreading to neighbours such as Burkina Faso, Mali, Chad and northern Nigeria as 15,000,000 are estimated to face a chronic food shortage in Niger. The EU and UN also put out a famine alert for Niger, Burkina Faso, Mali, Chad and northern Nigeria and began to appeal for aid on the 28th. The EU, China and Russia stopped giving Niger aid in 2009 after President Mamadou Tandja defied UN, EU and worldwide criticism over extending his term in office.

=== February ===
The UN, NGOs and charities warned of heavy food insecurity in Southern Sudan throughout February due to an emerging famine and the ongoing conflict between Misseriya nomad in the Southern Kordofan department. The rainfall was reported at an all-time low in Mauritania and neighbouring parts of Senegal during most of February and early March.

The EU warns of a pending Sahel famine centered upon Niger, Burkina Faso and Chad on 1 February.

=== March ===
Human Rights Watch said that Al Qaeda should stop targeting African civilians and aid workers on 16 March.

A drought was confirmed to have hit parts of Burkina Faso on 10 March, by USAID and the UN.

On 13 March 2010 the UN, NGOs, the EU and various charities put out a famine alert for parts of southern Sudan.

On 15 March 2010 Britain's Save The Children charity launched an appeal as 840,000 Nigerians are confirmed to be in imminent risk of a famine.

On 17 March 2010, a famine was declared in Mao in Chad's sand-swept Kanem region.

On 23 March 2010, major sandstorms hit Mauritania, Senegal, the Gambia, Guinea Bissau, Guinea and inland Sierra Leone. Another hit southern Algeria, inland Mauritania, Mali and northern Côte d'Ivoire at the same time.

=== April ===
During April and June, Islamic Relief (IR) sent aid workers to the North Kordofan to help improve their 16-year-old Um Dam and North Kordofan Water Project (NKWP). The UN, NGOs, charities and the Sudanese government reported that food security was a major concern in South Sudan and would stay at risk until the rainy season in September.

By 8 April 2010, starving children and elders filled the wards of a hospital in Akobo, Sudan. Several aid groups like Save the Children and Medair found out that 46% of children in the region were malnourished. The U.N. blamed two years of failed rainfall and the ongoing tribal clashes in the region for helping to create the humanitarian crisis in southern Sudan. The World Food Programme(WFP) was feeding 80,000 (up from 20,000 since April 2009) and the U.N. says 4,300,000 people in southern Sudan need food aid.

On 23 April 2010, said Nigerien Culture Minister Aminata Takoubakoyea, there was a reported food supply deficit of 119,700 tonnes and a fodder supply deficit of 16,000,000 tonnes. Niger's leading musicians and singers held a charity concert in Niamey to assist.

=== May ===
On 1 May 2010, the West African nation of Chad was on the verge of a nationwide famine as drought, armed conflict, and an influx of Darfur refugees all contributed to a chronic food shortage that now affects 2,000,000 people (20% of the country's total population). Various aid groups, NGOs and charities said a catastrophic famine could hit the country in the near future if food relief does not arrive soon. The UN warned that a famine had hit the town of Mao in Chad's Kanem region.

The city of Niamey, Niger took in refugees from Tillabéri department 12 days before, after they turned up hoping the city would help them. By 3 May 2010, the towns of Kongomé, Zinder, Tanout and Dalli were the worst hit by the drought.

Morocco gives a short term cash loan to both the Niger and Mali.

NGOs and Charities report famine conditions Kindal region on the 5th.

On 12 and 26 May 2010, both Mauritania, the Sénégal River Area and neighbouring parts of both Senegal and Mali faced both drought and famine.

On 14 May 2010, USAID issued a food shortage alert for the Kordofan states.

Seven died of dehydration in Ghaidi Magha, Mauritania, near the Malian border on 18 May 2010.

Afrol News reported on 25 May that about 2,000,000 Chadians were at risk of having a famine occur in their regions after the combined effects of 2 years of drought and pestilence had ruined their harvest yet again.

On 27 and 28 May 2010, Mali and Niger faced a famine situation in their northern territories. The Kidal, Timboktu and Gao had their crops and livestock die off. Gao's historic nomad market had virtually no food stuffs or animal fodder in it.

31 May saw Chad embroiled in a fiscal controversy. A 12-metre statue of a horseman, the Rond-point de la Grande Armée, in the capital N'djamena, cost over $3,000,000. Both local critics, NGOs and overseas donor nations all wondered where the money had come from and thought it would have been better spent on buying food and irrigation equipment.

=== June ===
NGOs, various charities and the UN warned of heavy food shortages and food insecurity in Sudan's Blue Nile, Kassala, Janub Darfur, South Kordofan and North Kordofan departments.

Dehydration was reported to have killed one person in Niger, while others in the region were at risk of water shortages on 1 June.

Severe drought caused to 10,000,000 to go seriously short on as the Eastern Sahel crisis increases and local food prices surge on 3 June. Niger has 7,100,00 victims, Chad has 2,000,000 victims and other country have 900,000 victims in total. Niger, Chad, the eastern parts of Mali and northern Cameroon have also been badly affected by the failed rains and scorching heat, according to the UN World Food Programme. The WFP, which plans to assist 3,600,000 people in the coming months and said the crisis is expected to last at least until the next harvest in September 2010. The British charity Save the Children, launched an emergency appeal for Niger. Starving families were reported as either have travelled more than 1,000 kilometres (600 mi) to reach the capital Niamey to find work and/or beg for food, while others have crossed the border in Nigeria. A Similar situation is occurring in Chad as, desperate Chadians fled into southern Libya. Sudan and Burkina Faso were in a server food insecure situation too.

On 6 June 2010, growing famine in the Niger drove thousand of refugees into the Nigerian provinces of Kano and Katsina states. About 7,000,000 were facing a food shortage crisis in Niger.

On 7 June the Malian Government's Early Warning System released an estimate that 258,000 people were suffering from malnutrition in the towns of Gao and Kidal in April. Low and erratic rainfall in 2009 had occurred in Timbuktu, Kidal, and Gao, leading to a heavy regional drought. Hundreds of refugees moved to Gao from Burkina Faso and Niger, but were now too weak with starvation to leave Mali. The UN and Mali's government asked the developed nations for food aid and financial help in the face of the growing humanitarian crisis. The amount taken in Nigeria's harvest was down by 65,000 tonnes, whilst Niger had virtually nothing to take from their harvest.

On 8 June 2010, France food aid to and the European Union pledged an additional $28,000,000 million to help the millions of victims in the Niger, the Chad, Burkina Faso, and northern Nigeria. The charity Save the Children sent a team to Aguie in Niger, 850 km north east from the capitol Niamey, to set up an aid centre on the 8th and reported back on the 9th than 350,000 children faced severe malnutrition. On 9 June, various groups of hydrologists, geologists and scientists in the Sahara desert used magnetic imaging technology when looking for aquifer sites for drilling water wells in Eastern Chad. Both northern Mali, southern Libya, southern Algeria, eastern Chad were being examined in part of an ongoing project to find viable drilling as the region's nations try to find new water sources to keep up with their growing demand. In recent years, roughly 300,000 refugees have arrived from both the war-torn Sudan and ailing Central African Republic, thus straining the already limited water supplies. Both Algeria, Burkina Faso, Mauritania, Morocco, Mozambique, Niger have shown a major interest in the further development of this resource lead local industry.

On 11 June 2010, the UN's World Food Organisation, Oxfam and MSF all warned of an impending famine in Mali, Mauritania, Burkina Faso, Niger and northern Nigeria. Niger's Diffa Region was of the most concern to the experts at hand.

By 13 June 2010, roughly 30% of crops failed in some of Niger's provinces.

A new heat wave hit Niger on 21 June, causing an increased area of drought in that country as well. Niger's crops failed and famine occurred. About 350,000 faced starvation and 1,200,000 were at risk of famine according to the Niger's government, while the UN said roughly 2,000,000 Chadians, 7,000,0000 Nigerians and 1,000,000 other people of the Sahel region faced starvation and 200,000 Nigerian children were malnourished.

In over-heated Chad, the temperature reached 47.6 °C (117.7 °F) on 22 June in Faya-Largeau, breaking a record set in 1961 at the same location. Niger tied its highest temperature record set in 1998, on also 22 June, at 47.1 °C in Bilma. That record was broken the next day, on 23 June when Bilma hit 48.2 °C (118.8 °F). The hottest temperature recorded in Sudan was reached on 22 June, at 49.7 °C (121.3 °F) in Dongola, breaking a record set in 1987. Sudan's record temperature was matched on the 23rd too.

On 23 June the UN, WFP and various humanitarian agencies requested $190,700,000 million to enable them respond to the unfolding famine in Niger. The UN estimates that just under 50% of country's 7,100,000 people risked starving to death.

On 24 June the government of Niger admitted that it was suffering from a major famine and said aid workers and NGOs were now welcome. The government of the Ivory Coast had reported to various NGOs that it was struggling to control desertification and imminent drought conditions in parts of its northern savanna lands. Oxfam launch a £7,000,000 emergency appeal to try to help more than 800,000 of the most vulnerable people in Chad, Niger and Mali. 26 June saw 1,600,000 Chadians facing food insecurity in the Bahr el Gazel Region, Batha Region, Guera Region, Hadjer-Lamis Region, Lac Region and the Kanem Region. About 604,000 people were benefiting from its assistance as a total 60% of families became victims of the famine in varying degrees according to the UN's World Food Programme (WFP). Chad appealed to donors for increased contribution to the international famine relief operation in Chad that received US$42,100,000 of a pledged total of US$65,000,000, to enable it continue all its relief work and charitable activities until the end of the year 2010. Cameroon also suffered from heavy desertification in the savanna regions of South Region, Centre Region, West Region, Northwest Region and Far North Region.

=== July ===
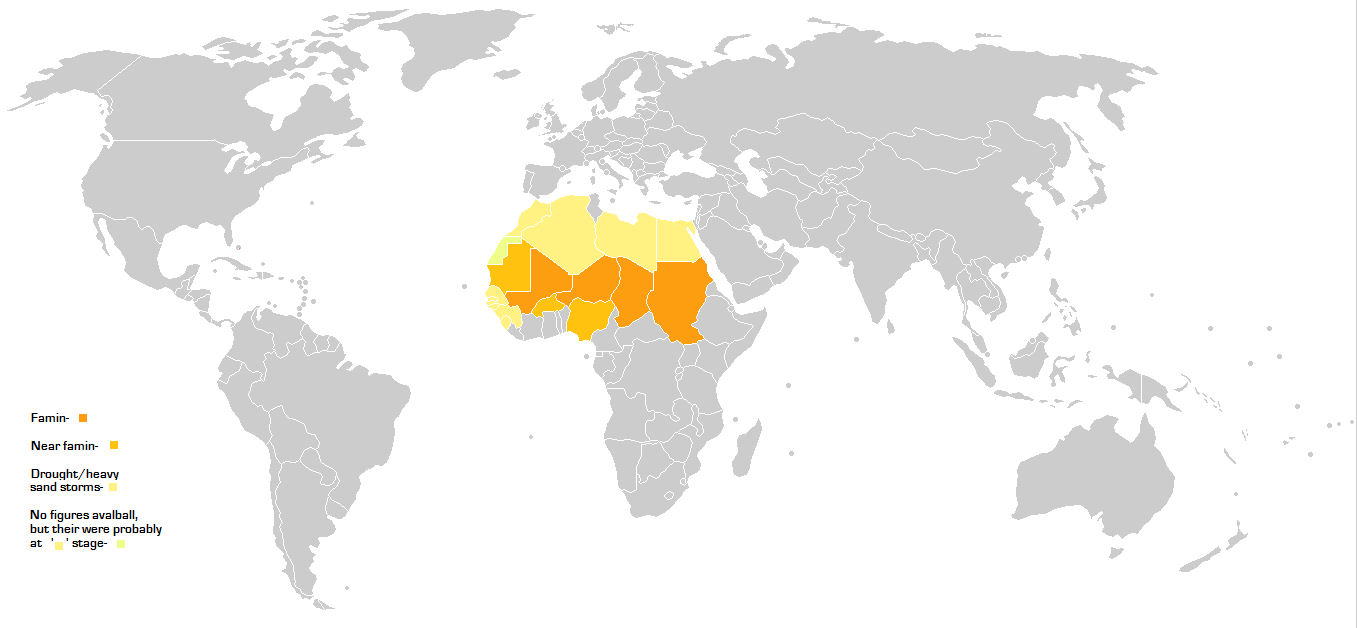
This map shows the nations hit by the 2010 Sahel African famine. Orange-tinted nations were in immediate risk of or had a famine according to the UN/ICRC or aid organisations like CAFOD. Yellow-tinted nations had heavy sandstorm, food shortages or a drought, but did not go as far as to have an actual famine itself.

July saw sporadic and small-scale food riots in Sudan's Blue Nile, Janub Darfur, South Kordofan and North Kordofan departments. The Muslim Hands charity set up an appeal and sent aid to Niger and Mali in July. It was the worst Niger famine since 1984, with 3,500,000 people starving.

On 6 July, the Methodist Relief and Development Fund (MRDF) aid experts said that more than 1,500,000 Nigerians were at risk of famine due to a month-long heat wave that was hovering over Niger, Mali, Mauritania and Morocco. A fund of about £20,000 was distributed to the crisis-hit countries of Niger, Mali, Burkina Faso and Mauritania.

The heat wave that left Morocco for the Iberian Peninsula on 11 July was attributed to the regional hot air currents that depart from the Sahara desert in Northern Africa at about 1,000 meters in altitude. This facilitated a movement in the hot air towards the Balkans and Ukraine via the Straits of Gibraltar, Spain and Italy. Unusually hot weather was also reported in parts of Algeria on 11 July.

On 12 July 2010, a local goat farmer was killed and his small flock stolen by Chadian refugees in the South Darfur region of the Sudan. The UN's WFP body estimated that 2,500,000 were at risk of a famine breaking out in their part of Niger.

On 13 July, the USAID funded Famine Early Warning Systems Network (FEWS NET), and the UN warned of a food supply shortage in northern Sudan, with increasing food insecurity focused on the war torn Darfur region and other neighbouring areas. The deteriorating security situation in the conflict zone was predicted to reduce both productivity and peoples' access to local agricultural well, as well as disrupting the seasonal livestock migration. USAID/OFDA provided $133,200,000 to the U.N. Food and Agriculture Organization (FAO) to help remedy the crisis in the three Darfur states. Concerns were also raised about the situation in Chad,

Three years of famine and then the recent sandstorms devastated Niger on 14 July. Diarrhoea, starvation, gastroenteritis, malnutrition and respiratory diseases kill and sicken many children. The new military junta appealed for international food aid and has taken serious steps to call overseas help since coming to office in February 2010. Sudan witnessed minor food rioting in Southern Kordofan, Blue Nile, and Abyei as profiteering locals and merchants and Ugandan exporters took advantage of the shortages in order to heavily mark up their selling prices.

15 July saw more border conflicts between the Nuer and the Dinka, further hindering aid workers in Southern Sudan.

On 17 July, Mohamed Béavogui, the Director of Western and Central Africa Division of the International Fund for Agricultural Development (IFAD), called for more international help for the people of the Sahel, who had a 410,000 tons of cereals and 20,000 tons of fodder deficit. He also condemned the world for not doing enough to help the Sahel, but stopped short of Cheminade's idea of pumping water from the Zaire River into Lake Chad to reinvigorate its water supply and stop any further shrinkage.

On 24 July, the British Red Cross flew its logistics teams Bristol Airport to Niger to help the army and local officials with transportation. The relief effort has already been made possible by the response to the Red Cross's West Africa Crisis Appeal, which aims to raise £500,000. According to UN agencies, 200,000 children need treatment for malnutrition in Niger alone, as Oxfam put out an £7,000,000 appeal to cover both Chad and Niger.

France sent unspecified food and cash aid to Mali on 25 July.

On 26 July the heat reached near-record levels over Chad and Niger, and about 20 had reportedly died in northern Niger of dehydration on 27 July.

27 July also saw a critical situation occurring in northern Mali and Chad. About 8,000,0000 Nigerians, 1,600,000 Chadians and 500,000 Malians were on the verge of a major food shortage as the Nigerian journalist Tidiane Kassé said that by tackling the consequences rather than the causes would be a better form of long-term help for the region.

On 31 July, leading economists predicted that food prices, especially wheat, would rise in Chad as Russia ends exports due to a domestic drought destroying their wheat and barley harvests.

=== August ===
On 1 August, Gadabeji, Niger suffered 35 °C heat and drought. On 1 August, just under 12,000,000 people in Niger (approximately 80% of the nation's entire population) faced a food supply crisis and possibly even famine conditions. The Tillabéri region is 30 km from the capital, Niamey, on the road to the Saharan town of Timbuktu. Unusually severe rainfall destroyed and then rotted the farmers' crops. Basic food stuffs like maize, millet and sorghum were running out in West Africa's Sahel. Both Chad and northern Nigeria have a similar, but less severe problem.

On 3 August, Burkina Faso was hit by a drought, as 4,500,000 Burkinans and 6,700,000 Nigerians faced starvation. Human Rights Watch (HRW) said the Sudanese Nuer–Dinka war was hampering relief efforts and damaging agricultural output in parts of South Sudan.

10 August saw an Al Jazeera reporter say that 7,500,000 Nigerians were at risk of famine and 15,000,000 could face a famine across the Sahel.

An estimated 8,000,000 people faced famine conditions in Niger on 11 August. Senegal and Gambia sent food aid to the Niger.

On 12 August, Gianluca Ferrera, deputy director for the UN's World Food Programme in the Niger, said malnutrition and crop failures were at a record levels in 2010. Food shortages are affecting 12,000,000 people and 400,000 children face starvation. Food prices rose by about 300% since the crisis began and thus hardly any one can afford to buy the remaining food.

14 August saw protests across Sénégal over concerns relating to the ruling party's poor governance in the face of recent floods, storms and power cuts across the country, along with the current heavy drought in Senegal's Sahel region.

15 August had aid workers and their organisations warn of an imminent nationwide famine in Niger.

On 20 August, floods which were the worst for 80 years hit the Shale region. The U.N. warned that Niger, Chad, Burkina Faso, Cameroon and northern Nigeria are also in the grip of the worst regional food crisis since 2006. In the savannah Kano, Nigeria, over 2,000 families were displaced by floods and in the nearby Jigawa region, an entire village was evacuated due to heavy flooding. In Mauritania, a flood damaged bridges and many homes in the mountain town of Aioun. Heavy flooding was occurring around parts of lake Chad.

Most international aid agencies withdraw workers due to the regional kidnapping crisis. Niger's government spokesman Mahamane Lawali Danda told the BBC that the pullout came as a surprise since no one had told his government Niger was on the list of dangerous 'kidnapper infested' pariah states, along with Chad, Darfur and Sudan. Mauritania and Mali were not on the list of dangerous nations, despite several al-Qaeda lead kidnappings during 2009.

The U.N. warned of mass starvation in Niger and Chad and Oxfam said people in the region were surviving on leaves and berries picked in the wild. 8,000,000 were said to be near starvation by both organisation. The UN estimated that up to 7,800,000 Nigeriens were affected by heavy food shortages. Cafod set up a £100,000 aid programme on 21 August.

25 August had a French aid worker kidnapped in Chad. The kidnapping of foreigners along the Chad–Darfur border became more frequent in 2009. A French NGO worker was taken and then murdered on 29 October 2009, and an unidentified Red Cross worker was captured on 10 November 2009. Many NGOs and charities had started to restrict the areas covered by their aid work in Niger, Chad and Sudan, due to the ever-present risk of bandits and kidnapers.

On 28 August, charities and NGOs put out food shortage alerts for Niger. Heavy rain falls on the border of the CAR and the Chad.

31 August saw 7,900,000 of Niger's 15,300,000 people in immediate risk of starvation and Gordon Brown MP making plans for a $100,000 charity speech on the development of irrigation and water schemes to increase cultivable land the Niger and the Chad. He was quoted to have said in the interview that:

But, today, where there is suffering without hope, we can prevent children dying painful, avoidable deaths

On 31 August Sudan's army reported that 3 Russian helicopter crew members had been abducted by gunmen in Nyala, capital of South Darfur, just hours after Samaritan's Purse aid worker Flavia Wagner who had been kidnapped 18 May was set free. She was taken from the South Darfurian village of Abu Ajura, along with two Sudanese colleagues who were also freed after a week. The governor of South Darfur, Abdel Hamid Kasha, Sudan foreign ministry spokesman Moawiya Osman and Samaritan's Purse's leader Franklin Graham, and the Russian ambassador to Chad welcomed Flavia's release, but condemned the kidnap of the three Russians and that of two Jordanian UNAMID police advisers in Darfur, on the 14th. Another Russian helicopter pilot was taken prisoner for four days after landing in South Darfur to take rebels' spokesmen to Chad for alleged peace talks.

=== September ===
On 1 September, aid agencies and NGOs called for aid to be given to Niger as 7,000,000 faced starvation.

4 September had Cholera outbreaks kill 41 in Chad and one in Nigeria.

8 September saw a Chinese CGC Overseas Construction Co. Ltd. oil worker kidnapped in Bahaï, Chad and took him to Sharq al-Teyna, in Sudan's Darfur region.

On 13 September the Prem Rawat Foundation gave $30,000 loan to pay for Niger to buy food aid for children of its nomadic tribal groups.

On 14 September heavy rainfall in central and southern Chad raised hopes that the major drought in Africa's Sahel region would be over by early 2011. 10,000,000 were near to starvation in the Sahel. The UN's WFP had estimated that Chad needs about 100,000 metric tonnes of food aid, but had only received 70,000 metric tonnes so far. Most of the Chadian need to sell more cereal crops to make enough money to repay their huge debts. farmers According to Jean François Caremel of the Action Against Hunger charity branch in Chad. As both Chad and Niger faced an improving situation due to heavy rain fall over these countries, but a major famine was still unfolding in other countries of West Africa's dry Sahelian region

15 September had Sudanese and Chadian forces jointly searching for both the Chinese oil industry engineer taken on the 8th and a Chinese aid worker who was kidnapped from the same town on the morning of the 15th. Both the Chinese ambassador to Chad, the Chadian government and the Solidarity Action for Peace and Development NGO condemned the kidnappings. The Chinese hostage was released in the Dafur on the 17th.

18 and 19 September In Hadejia, Nigeria, The flood victims sleep wherever they can, the men search for dry spots on the roads while women and children keep piling into their houses still standing as huge number of displaced people have returned to flood-hit villages in Northern Nigeria. Over two million people were affected by the flood waters and more than 50,000 families are still wandering homeless. Residential areas of the Kararar Rima village was also destroyed in the flood. Most of the houses were made of clay, so they easy dissolved in the flood water. As the rains fell the end of the pending famine looked close.

=== October ===
The famine was finally relieved, as floods hit Ghana, Niger, Nigeria and Benin in October 2010. Cotonou's residents in Benin had to board canoes, on the 9th due to severe flooding. According to the UN, 680,000 people were homeless while more than 300,000 acres of crops had been destroyed and 81,000 livestock killed. Flooding began in mid-September when heavy rains caused the Niger River in Benin's north to overflow and break its banks. Rainfall continued across the country. Heavy rains caused the collapse of an already damaged dam in Ghana and displaced more than 700,000 people.

== International response ==
The donor nation or organisation involved	Type of aid given	Amount of material aid given	Amount of cash given
France	Food	N/A	N/A
Senegal	Food	N/A	N/A
Morocco	Cash	N/A	N/A
The Gambia	Food	N/A	N/A
UK	Cash	N/A	N/A
USA	Food and cash	N/A	$133,000,000
Gordon Brown MP	Cash	N/A	$100,000
International Red Cross	Food and expert advisors	N/A	N/A
Charities and NGOs	Mixed goods, expert advisors and cash	N/A	Over £165,000
The EU	Cash	N/A	Over $28,000,000
The UN	Mixed goods, expert advisors and cash	N/A	N/A

== Long term food security plans ==
=== Food security schemes ===
The CILSS member states.

Against a backdrop of conventional interventions through the state or markets, alternative initiatives have been pioneered to address the problem of food security. An example is the "Community Area-Based Development Approach" to agricultural development ("CABDA"), an NGO programme with the objective of providing an alternative approach to increasing food security in Africa. CABDA proceeds through specific areas of intervention such as the introduction of drought-resistant crops and new methods of food production such as agro-forestry. In an analysis of the programme by the Overseas Development Institute, CABDA's focus on individual and community capacity-building is highlighted. This enables farmers to influence and drive their own development through community-run institutions, bringing food security to their household and region.

=== Aquifer usage ===
Mali and Libya were also tapping into the ancient Sub-Saharan aquifer and Bas Saharan Basin as a source of drinking water, as of 2009 and 2008 respectively.

On 9 June 2010 various groups of hydrologists, geologists and scientists in the Sahara desert used magnetic imaging techniques when looking for sites in aquifers for drilling water wells in Eastern Chad. Northern Mali, southern Libya, southern Algeria, eastern Chad were being examined in part of an ongoing project to find viable drilling as the region's nations try to find new water sources to keep up with their growing demand. Algeria, Burkina Faso, Mauritania, Morocco, Mozambique, Niger have shown a major interest in the further development of this resource lead local industry, which could prove a valuable asset for nomads, local farmers and townsfolk alike in the years to come.

=== The 'Food Crises Prevention and Management Charter' ===
The Food Crises Prevention and Management Charter was validated on 11 August 2010, in the drought that hit Gambia. The signatory countries were from the Permanent Interstate Committee for drought control in the Sahel (CILLS) and West Africa Club (SWAC), and the Gambia, which was also hosting the event. Mali, Mauritania, Senegal and the Gambia chose to express specific opinions on how to stop any further droughts in the region. The goal of the treaty is to help avert and mitigate the effects of future droughts, famines and food shortages in the member states. The CILSS was created in 1973 during the first of the 'great droughts' of the late 20th century.

== Climate and vegetation overview ==
Drought-hit nation	Satellite image	Climate summary	Population density, km^{−2} (/sq mi)	Sahel state, Sénégal River-area state or CILLS member
Sudan		Sudan straddles the Sahara, with only the Nile Valley and the small coastal region being available to agriculture and part of the Sudd flood plain lies in the south Water levels fluctuate up to 1.5 meters, depending on the intensity of seasonal flooding. and is mostly Sudanian savanna and sahel.	16.9 (43.7) – joint figure for both	No.
Southern Sudan		South Sudan has got more tropical savanna and Sahel ecoregions and most of the Sudd flood plain lies in the north Water levels fluctuate up to 1.5 meters, depending on the intensity of seasonal flooding. and is mostly Sudanian savanna and sahel.	16.9 (43.7) – joint figure for both	Sahel.
Chad		Chad is divided into three distinct zones, from the Sudanese savanna in the south, the Sahel in the central belt and the Sahara Desert in the north. The most fertile land is around the steadily shrinking Lake Chad.	8.0 (20.8)	Sahel and CILLS
Central African Republic		The climate of the C.A.R. is generally tropical. The northern areas are subject to harmattan winds, which are hot, dry, and carry dust. The northern regions have been subject to desertification, and the northeast is a desert. The remainder of the country is prone to flooding from nearby rivers as much of the southern border is formed by tributaries of the Congo River, with the Mbomou River in the east merging with the Uele River to form the Ubangi River. In the west, the Sangha River flows through part of the country. The eastern border lies along the edge of the Nile river watershed. The estimated amount of the country covered by forest ranges up to 8%, with the densest parts in the south. It is highly diverse, and includes commercially important species of Ayous, Sapelli and Sipo. The deforestation rate is 0.4% per annum, and lumber poaching is commonplace.	7.1 (18.4)	No
Cameroon		The climate varies with the terrain. The climate is exceedingly hot and humid, the coastal belt includes some of the wettest places on earth. For example, Debundscha, at the base of Mt. Cameroon, has an average annual rainfall of 10,300 mm (405 in). The coastal plain extends 15 to 150 kilometres (9.3 to 93.2 mi) inland from the Gulf of Guinea and has an average elevation of 90 metres (295 ft). Exceedingly hot and humid with a short dry season, this belt is densely forested and includes some of the wettest places on earth, part of the Cross-Sanaga-Bioko coastal forests. The South Cameroon Plateau rises from the coastal plain to an average elevation of 650 metres (2,100 ft). Equatorial rainforest dominates this region, although its alternation between wet and dry seasons makes it is less humid than the coast. This area is part of the Atlantic Equatorial coastal forests ecoregion. An irregular chain of mountains, hills, and plateaus known as the Cameroon range extends from Mount Cameroon on the coast—Cameroon's highest point at 4,095 metres (13,435 ft)—almost to Lake Chad at Cameroon's northern tip. This region has a mild climate, particularly on the Western High Plateau, although rainfall is high. Its soils are among Cameroon's most fertile, especially around volcanic Mount Cameroon. Volcanism here has created the crater lakes, like Lake Nyos of the Cameroonian Highlands forests ecoregion. The southern plateau rises northward to the grassy, rugged Adamawa Plateau. This feature stretches from the western mountain area and forms a barrier between the country's north and south. Its average elevation is 1,100 metres (3,600 ft), and its temperature ranges from 22 to 25 °C (72 to 77 °F), with high rainfall. The northern lowland region extends from the edge of the Adamawa to Lake Chad with an average elevation of 300 to 350 metres (980 to 1,100 ft). Its characteristic vegetation is savanna scrub and grass. This is an arid region with sparse rainfall and high median temperatures.	39.7 (102.8)	No
Nigeria		Nigeria is covered by rainforests over the southern third, Guinean forest-savanna mosaic in the middle third and both savannas and Sahel in the northern third. The mountain land is also found in the mountains near the Cameroonian border. The most southerly part of the forest, especially around the Niger River and Cross River deltas, is mangrove swamp (see Central African mangroves). North of this is fresh water swamp, containing different vegetation from the salt water mangrove swamps, and north of that is rain forest.	167.5 (433.8)	Sahel
Niger		Niger's subtropical climate is mainly very hot and dry. Niger is located mostly in the Sahara desert save for a small piece of tropical savanna around the River Niger basin. Some flat to rolling savanna and Sahel land is in the southernmost fifth of its territory and in the northern hills.	12.0 (31.2)	Sahel and CILLS
Burkina Faso		A relatively dry tropical savanna, the Sahel extends beyond the borders of Burkina Faso, and borders the Sahara to its north and the fertile region of the Sudan to the South. Situated at a middle latitude is the Sudan-Sahel region, a transitional zone for rainfall and temperature levels. Further to the south, the Sudan-Guinea zone receives more than heavy rain each year and has cooler temperatures. The northern fringes of the country are beginning to become a desert.	57.5 (148.9)	Sahel and CILLS
Côte d'Ivoire/Ivory Coast		Côte d'Ivoire's terrain can generally be described as a large plateau rising gradually from sea level in the south to almost 500 m elevation in the north. In the south of Côte d'Ivoire is marked by coastal inland lagoons that starts at the Ghanaian border and stretch 300 km (190 mi) along the eastern half of the coast. The south and southwest of the country are covered with dense tropical moist forest like the Eastern Guinean forests and Western Guinean lowland forests that cross the Sassandra River. The mountains of Dix-Huit Montagnes region are home to the Guinean montane forests. The Guinean forest-savanna mosaic belt extends across the middle of the country from east to west. The North is part of the West Sudanian savanna, a savanna-and-scrubland zone of lateritic or sandy soils, with vegetation decreasing from south to north. The terrain is mostly flat to undulating plains, with mountains in the northwest. The climate of Côte d'Ivoire is generally warm and humid, ranging from equatorial in the southern coasts to tropical in the middle and semiarid in the far north. There are three seasons: warm and dry (November to March), hot and dry (March to May), and hot and wet (June to October). Temperatures average between 25 and 32 °C (77 and 90 °F) and range from 10 to 40 °C (50 to 104 °F).	63.9 (165.6)	No
Mali		About two-thirds of Mali is located in the Sahara desert, exempt for the southeastern third, which contains both a Sahel zone and fertile tropical savanna around the River Niger.	11.7 (30.3)	Sahel, CILLS and Sénégal River Area
Algeria		The coastal quarter has a Mediterranean climate, while the rest is either a sandy desert or semi-desert on the interior's few hills. There is a strip of Sahel running through the far south and the climate is cooler in the mountain regions	14.3 (37.1)	Sahel
Mauritania		Mauritania is located mostly in the Sahara desert save for a small piece of tropical savanna and Sahel around the River Senegal in approximately the southernmost quarter of its territory. Because of extended, severe drought, the desert has been expanding since the mid-1960s. To the west, between the ocean and the eastern plateaus, are alternating areas of clayey plains and sand dunes, some of which are shifted from place to place by high winds.	3.2 (8.2)	Sahel state, CILLS and Sénégal River Area
Senegal		Senegal has a both Sahel, Sahel-Soudan, Sudan_(region), Soudan-Guinea, tropical rainforest, and Guinean mangroves. Most of the southern Casamance arm of the country has been classified by the World Wildlife Fund as part of the Guinean forest-savanna mosaic ecoregion.	69.7 (180.4)	Sahel state, CILLS and Sénégal River Area
Gambia		The Gambia has a subtropical climate with distinct cool, dry and hot, humid seasons. The temperature escalates rapidly on going inland and has been known to reach as high as 51 °C on occasions. The average annual rainfall ranges from 920 mm (36.2 in) in the interior to 1,450 mm (57.1 in) along the coast. The grassy flood plain of the Gambia River, which contains Guinean mangroves near the coast, with West Sudanian savanna upriver and inland.	164.3 (425.5)	CILLS and Sénégal River Area (observer member).
Guinea		Guinea has both lowland belt running north to south behind the coast (Lower Guinea), which is part of the Guinean forest-savanna mosaic ecoregion; the pastoral Fouta Djallon highlands (Middle Guinea); the northern fertile (Upper Guinea); and a south-eastern rain-forest region (Forest Guinea).	41.0 (106.1)	Sahel state, CILLS and Sénégal River Area
Guinea Bissau		The climate in Guinea-Bissau is tropical and is generally hot and humid. It has a monsoonal-type rainy season with southwesterly winds and a dry season with northeasterly Harmattan winds. It is warm all year around and there is little temperature fluctuation; it averages 26.3 °C (79.3 °F). The average rainfall for Bissau is 2,024 mm (79.7 in) although this is almost entirely accounted for during the rainy season which falls between June and September/October. From December through April, the country experiences drought. The terrain of Guinea-Bissau is mostly low coastal plain with swamps of Guinean mangroves rising to Guinean forest-savanna mosaic in the east.	44.6 (115.5)	CILLS

== See also ==
- 1983–1985 famine in Ethiopia
- 2005–06 Niger food crisis
- 2006 Horn of Africa food crisis
- 2009 West Africa floods
- 2010 Northern Hemisphere heat waves
- 2010 Pakistan floods
- 2010 Russian wildfires
- 2010 West African floods
- 2011 East Africa drought
- 2012 Sahel drought
- Great Green Wall (Africa)
- Community of Sahel–Saharan States
- East Sudanian Savanna
- Green Sahara
- Malawian food crisis
- Pan Sahel Initiative
- Sahara Conservation Fund
- Sahel drought
- Sudan (region)
- Sudanian Savanna
- Trans-Sahelian Highway
- Yacouba Sawadogo
- YemenEmergency Appeal
