= 2010 West African floods =

2010 floods in 6 West African countries

The 2010 Nigerien floods were floods across Niger which left over 111,000 people homeless. Niger was already suffering acute food shortages following prolonged drought in the Sahel region. As of 24 August 2010, at least 6 to 8 people had died. The Niger river was pushed to its highest levels in 80 years. The floods subsequently spread along the River Niger into Nigeria, Ghana, Burkina Faso, Togo and Benin over the next few months. Later storms also brewed up in the CAR, Morocco and northern Algeria.

== June 1–2 ==
It was confirmed on June 2 that at least 24 people were killed across Ghana the previous weekend according to Mr Kofi Portuphy, coordinator of the National Disaster Management Organisation. Three regions, including the capital Accra had been flooded by heavy on the previous Sunday.

== July 11 ==
On July 11, CHF 134,948 (USD 124,353 or EUR 101,870) had been selected by the Federation's Disaster Relief Emergency Fund to support the Ghana's Red Cross Society in delivering primary aid to assistance about 5,000 people.

The International Federation's Disaster Relief Emergency Fund (DREF) was created by the International Federation in 1985 to ensure immediate financial support is available for Red Cross and Red Crescent disasters relief.

== August 9–10 ==
On 9 August Ghana's government issued a flood warning for three northern regions because of rising water levels at two dams in flood hit neighbouring Burkina Faso. The UN's Irin news agency said 40 people died in flooding in Ghana during June and July while 14 people had died Burkina Faso last month. The International Federation of the Red Cross said it was providing aid to flood and rain related landslide victims in the Central African Republic and in Ivory Coast. CAFOD also said it was planning to send aid to Guinea. A rain induced landslide killed at least 13 people (mostly children ) in the Sierra Leoneian capital, Freetown. Heavy rain fell downstream in part of the watershed of the River Niger around Burkina Faso caused floods upstream, along the river bed as far in as in Niamey's Commune 4 precinct August 9, 2010.

On 10 August 2010 the Niger River floods had killed 30,000 animals, destroyed 500 homes and 20,000 people faced homelessness due to heavy rainfall in West and Central Africa according to the UN. The northern part of the Chad is in the Sahara desert (a nation which was gripped by famine earlier this year) and recorded the heaviest rain in 50 years and hail stones the size of eggs destroyed crops in central Guinea during July, the UN said.

== August 20–31 ==
On August 20, the worst floods for 80 years hit the Shale region. The United Nations (U.N.) warned that Niger, Chad, Burkina Faso, Cameroon and northern Nigeria were in the grip of the worst regional food crisis since 2006. In the savannah Kano, Nigeria, over 2,000 families were displaced by floods and in the nearby Jigawa region, an entire village was evacuated due to heavy flooding. Heavy flooding was occurring around parts of Lake Chad.

Floods hit Niger which left over 111,000 people homeless. Niger was already suffering acute food shortages following prolonged drought in the Sahel region. As of 24 August 2010, at least 6 to 8 people had died. The Niger river was pushed to its highest levels in 80 years.

Nigeria has seen entire northern villages washed away and aid workers have finally worked out that 200,000 were made homeless in the Niger since the rains started falling in mid-August.

A Mauritania, a child was swept in a flood that have damaged bridges and many homes in the mountain town of Aioun. Heavy flooding was occurring around parts of lake Chad.

On August 31 thousands fled a south Sudan flood. Over 57,135 people were made homeless said Olivia Lomoro, the Sudanese undersecretary for health. The heavy and slightly premature seasonal rains hit the north of Bahr el-Ghazal state and the spread southward, with much of Aweil town surrounding countryside under water due to the near to constant month-long down pour. South Sudan's Health Minister Luka Monoja warned that the rains, which last until October, could force out more people as he toured the disaster zone. Aid agencies were working to support those who were displaced by the floods and the Sudanese health ministry sent medical supplies and the South Sudanese humanitarian ministry is sending tents for emergency shelter and 15,000 bags of grain to replace that lost when local farms and cattle feeding sites were flooded. Most of the province was flat and covered in virtually insoluble and water resistant soil. The floods would ultimately provide water to feed the River Nile and both Sudan and Southern Egypt prepared for a heavy rise in the Nile's water depth.

== September 1–19 ==
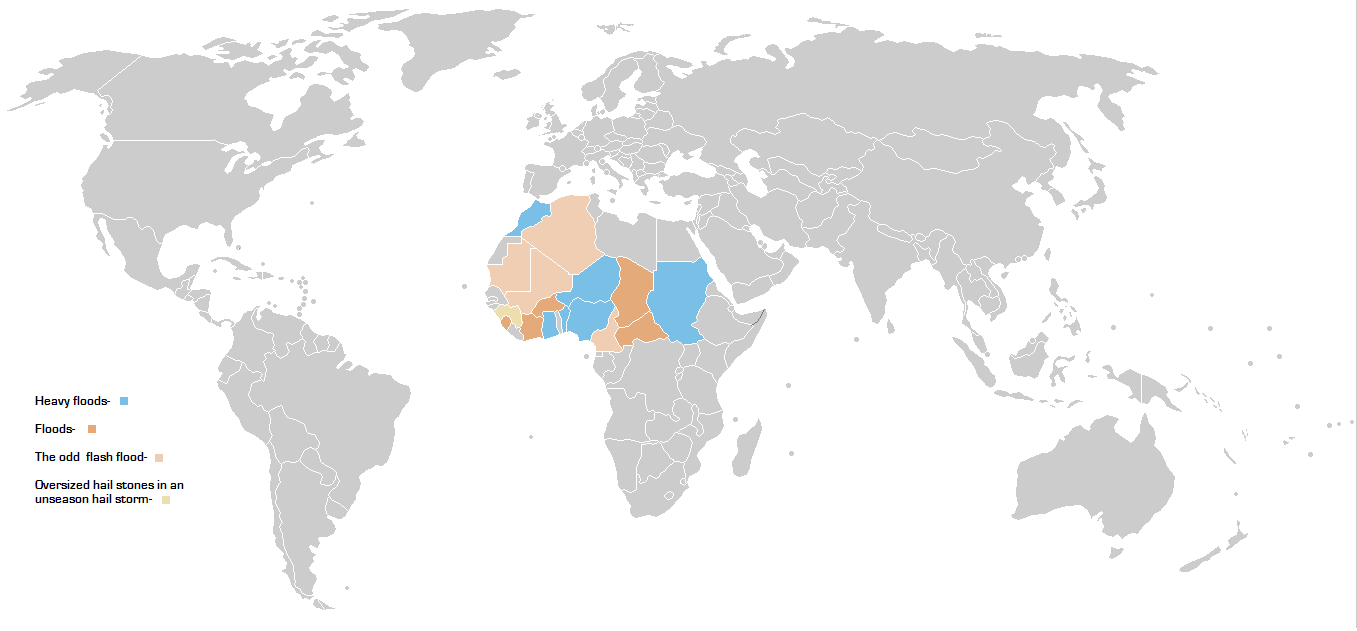
This image shows the nations hit by the 2010 West African floods. the worst hit are coloured blue.

On September 1, floods hit the Niger. The districts of Zarmagandaye, Lamorde and Karadje are three districts of the West African country's capital Niamey which were then flooded ruins. It was the worst flood by the River Niger recorded since 1929. An elderly fisherman called Abdou Ganda said he had never seen anything like it in his life.

On September 18–19 in Hadejia, Nigeria, the flood victims sleep wherever they can, the men search for dry spots on the roads while women and children keep piling into their houses still standing as a huge number of displaced people have returned to flood-hit villages in Northern Nigeria. Over two million people were affected by the flood waters and more than 50,000 families were still wandering homeless. Residential areas of the Kararar Rima village was also destroyed in the flood. Most of the houses were made of clay, so they easy dissolved in the flood water. As the rains fell the end of the pending famine looked close.

== October 6–8 ==
By October 6, CHF 122,297 (USD 124,389 or EUR 92,163) has been allocated from the IFRC's Disaster Relief Emergency Fund to the Ghana Red Cross Society for immediate Support for some 3,000 households.

Monsoon floods had been reported in the Brong-Ahafo, Eastern, Western and Northern Regions of Ghana, with many families becoming homeless in the disaster. Western Region had notification that about 6,000 people were affected and two died in the Enchi district, according to the Red Cross' initial assessment. Other badly affected areas were Chereponi, Gusheigu, West Mamprusi, East-2, Mamprusi, East Gonja, and West Gonja Districts.

West Gonja District witnessed more than 900 houses, 11 school buildings, about 832 acres farm land and 3 road bridges destroyed and more than 500 people displaced. The Northern Region had lost 18 lives, 25 were injured, about 2,097 houses had collapsed and so far 25 people were injured. Bridges and 8,760 acres of farmlands had been destroyed and nearly 9,674 households were displaced. Presently, about 123 communities have been affected especially in the West Gonja District.

Ghana has two seasonal rainy seasons which last from June to August in the south and August to September in the north, leading to a double-whammy of potential flooding each year.

The spillage of excess water over the parapet at the overfull Bagre Dam in neighbouring Burkina Faso, was expected continue and to lead to further heavy localised flooding in Burkina Faso and cause further floods in Ghana over the next few weeks.

Both the Ghana Red Cross Society, National Disaster Management Organization (NADMO), Gahanna police force and Gahanna military, Gahanna Government Ministries, UNICEF, USAID, The International Organization for Migration (IOM) and FAO all offered their assistance to the flooding northern region.

Between October 8 and 31, 2010, CHF 122,297 (USD 124,389 or EUR 92,163) had been allocated from the IFRC's Disaster Relief Emergency Fund (DREF) to help support the Ghana Red Cross Society (GRCS) primary aid work for 3,000 households.

== October 9–18 ==
Cotonou's residents had to board canoes in Benin on the 9th due to severe flooding. The UN said 680,000 people were homeless as more than 300,000 acres of crops were destroyed and 81,000 livestock killed. Flooding began in mid-September when heavy rains caused the Niger River in Benin's north to overflow and break its banks. Rainfall continued across the country, ensuring the foods would continue. Heavy rains caused the collapse of an already damaged a dam in Ghana and displaced more than 700,000 people.

The famine was finally relieved, but floods hit Ghana, Niger, Nigeria and Benin in October, but an exceptionally heavy flood had hit some countries instead.

15 days of floods and torrential rain killed 43 people, left 97,815 and destroyed 55,000 homes in Benin according to the UN Office for the Coordination of Humanitarian Affairs aid worker Kemoral Jadjombaye.

Nearly 66% of the nation was experiencing some degree of flooding and the city of Cotonou, the economic capital, was in chaos on October 18. A total of 42 of the 77 communes were flooded. Cotonou is a low-lying city and is flooded by the Oueme River nearly every year. 800 people also caught cholera, of which 7 died.

== November 29–30 ==
By November 29, the WFP provided food for 25,000 victims in urgent need of assistance, which was valued at US$300,000, will include maize, beans, vegetable oil and salt, the UN agency said in a statement to the world media. The East Gonja, Kpandai, Wa East, Wa West and Krachi East District.

The torrential monsoon weather hit many parts of the country resulting in heavy flooding that affected more than 140,000 people, which was worse by the spilling-over of excess water from the dam wall at the Bagre Dam and Kompienga Dams in Burkina Faso, which then in turn led to the overflowing of Ghana's Akosombo Dam.

November 30 saw the European storms spread into north Africa that evening with at least 30 people killed in Morocco after heavy rain and floods. Morocco's l MAP news agency said 24 people died when a bus was swept away by a flooding river in the coastal town of Bouznika. Four died when heavy rain brought down their homes near the central city of Khenifra and in Salé. A girl also drowned in Tiflet after a bridge collapsed into a raging river.

Authorates in Casablanca, schools were ordered to shut 18 cm (7 inches) fell on it overnight.

The head of Morocco's weather service 2M Al-Maghribia television the heavy rain would continue until December 2.

Royal Air Maroc flights were delayed at the country's main airport in Casablanca as they waited for passengers who could not passengers reaching the airport in the floods.

Both automated teller machines and inter-bank communication systems run by the Attijariwafa Bank, in Rabat, broke down due to a build-up of static electricity in that evening's thunderstorm.

== December 12–29 ==
On December 12 Action-Aid Ghana presented some building materials to the authorities in the Central Gonja District of the country's Northern Region for distribution to the 13 communities who were severely affected by the flood disaster and have agreed to move to higher grounds. 32,000 people in 55 communities were affected by the floods, as it destroyed homes, farmlands, road and bridges among other things. By December 22, Catholic Relief Services (CRS) had given out aid-trade vouchers valued at GHc 70.00 to over 700 displaced people from 700 households affected by floods in the town of Buipe. They were to be exchanged for building materials, clothing, bedding and children's books. They could also be used to register an account with the Ghanaian National Health Insurance Scheme, which is funded by the United States Agency for International Development (USAID) and the Catholic Bishops Conference of Ghana and the Central Gonja District Assembly. The aim was the aiding the 33,305 People who were made homeless recent floods which hit Northern Region. The floods hit Tamale, Ghana, the capital of the Northern Region of Ghana on December 28. December 29 saw a USAID voucher fair helped floods victims in Northern Ghana.

== See also ==
- Global storm activity of early 2010
- Global storm activity of mid-2010
- 2010 Milwaukee flood
- 2010 Var floods
- Green Sahara
- 2010 Sahel famine
- Sahel drought
- November 2010 European Windstorms
- 2009 West Africa floods
- 2010 Albania floods
