= West African floods =

West African floods may refer to:

- 2009 West Africa floods
- 2010 West African floods
- 2024 West African floods
