= Zabo =

Zabo may refer to:

- Zabo, Burkina Faso
- Zerzabelshof (de), locally usually abbreviated to Zabo, a district in the German city of Nuremberg
- Calvin Zabo, the alter ego of Marvel Comics character Mister Hyde
