= Yambo =

Yambo may refer to:

- Yambo Ouologuem (1940–2017), Malian writer
- Yambo (writer), Italian writer born Enrico Novelli
- Yambo, Burkina Faso
- Yanbu' al Bahr, a Saudi Red Sea port
- Yambo Records, a recording label
- Yambo, a trivia game played by guests of The Late Late Show with Craig Kilborn
- YAMBO code, a scientific software package (computational physics/chemistry)
