= Lemina Mint El Kotob Ould Moma =

Lemina Mint El Kotob Ould Moma (born 31 December 1968) was a Mauritanian Minister of Agriculture from 2015 until 2019.

== Career ==
Lemina Mint El Kotob Ould Moma was born on 31 December 1968 in Fderîck. She holds various diplomas and baccalaureates in science, public administration and personnel management from institutions in Mauritania, Morocco, Paris and Lyon. She is married and has four children.

Moma was Minister of Social Affairs, Children and the Family in 2008 in the government of Moulaye Ould Mohamed Laghdaf. She was transferred to the position of Minister of Agriculture on the 2 September 2015 cabinet reshuffle. She remained in the position as of 2017.

Soon after, Moma was appointed agriculture minister she sought to develop agriculture in the Senegal River, seeking to accelerate the implementation of water management projects funded by the World Bank. She attended the 5th Afrimet conference of directors of West African Meteorological and Hydrological Services in April 2016.

In 2016, she held a workshop with local farmers in Kiffa and committed her ministry to the construction of dams and dikes to preserve water and provide for crops.

Moma was chair of the 52nd session of the Permanent Interstate Committee for drought control in the Sahel in March 2017. She stated that the organization had helped to reduce the impact of food crises in recent years and was aiding development and modernisation and said her aims were to strengthen the organization and fight droughts through its resilience programmes.

Moma met with Ibrahim Adama Ahmed Dukhairy, President of the Arab Organization for Agricultural Development in November 2017 to review the Arab Food Programme and the collection of statistics in Mauritania.
