= Accra Technical Training Center =

Mixed second cycle institution in Kokomlemle, Accra, Ghana

Accra Technical Training Center (ATTC) is a technical and vocational institution in Accra, Ghana.

ATTC was established in July 1966 as a joint project by the Governments of Ghana and Canada. It was envisioned as a training school to train skilled workers for Ghana's industrial requirements and it marked the first major Canadian support to Ghana in the field of technical education and training.

ATTC trains workers for different occupations and trades. Currently, the school is under the Technical Division of the Ghana Education Service of the Ministry of Education.

== History ==
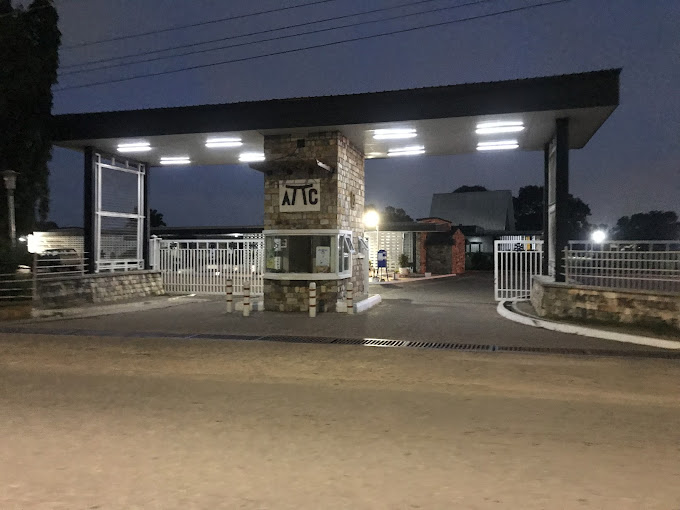

The ATTC was established as a major joint project between the governments of Ghana and Canada. Its core mission was to provide theoretical and practical instruction to train skilled manpower required for Ghana’s industrial development. This initiative represented the first significant Canadian support for Ghana in technical education and training.

The origins of the Centre trace back to the early 1960s, when the Canadian External Aid Office (now CIDA) sponsored a feasibility study for the establishment of a technical school. This study was conducted by Mr. Arnold Doyle, the Director of Vocational and Technical Education for the Canadian Province of Saskatchewan. Mr. Doyle subsequently became the Canadian Coordinator for the ATTC project. His Ghanaian counterpart was Mr Frank Hutchful, then Ghana's Director of Apprenticeship and Duty Chief Technical Education Officer.

=== Construction and Operation ===
Construction of the Centre began in 1964 under a formal Memorandum of Understanding. Canada's contribution was substantial, covering architectural services, all constructional materials, nearly all instructional equipment, furniture, and initial training consumables. Meanwhile, the Government of Ghana provided the land (courtesy of the Ga Traditional Council), covered local material purchases and labour, and bore all operating costs, maintenance, and the salaries of Ghanaian staff.

Crucially, as part of the agreement, a significant number of Ghanaian technicians were sent to Saskatchewan, Canada, for advanced training in vocational education. This programme aimed to enhance their professional skills and prepare them to eventually take over the centre's administration.

Construction of the main buildings finished in 1965. Operations officially commenced in July 1966. An initial team of 14 Canadian technical advisors from Saskatchewan, led by the first Canadian Principal, Mr. George Brown, worked alongside the first six Ghanaian instructors who had returned from their training in Canada.

The Centre's formal opening ceremony in July 1966 was attended by Mr Donald S. Macdonald, the Canadian Minister for External Affairs, and Mr. A.K. Deku, the Commissioner for Education in the National Liberation Council (NLC) Government of Ghana.

== Vision ==
To deliver relevant and quality skills training and bridge the skills gap to solve graduate unemployment towards national development and industrialisation through Technical Vocational Education Training (TVET).

== Mission ==
The Center provides technical and vocational education and training (TVET) aimed at developing employable skills for young people in Ghana.

== Trash Hack Initiative ==
UNESCO launched the Trash Hack initiative, an ESD campaign, in September 2020 to encourage young people to learn about sustainability by addressing waste issues. Globally, around 2 billion tonnes of waste are produced annually, polluting waterways, filling cities, and littering vast areas, including Ghana. In Ghana, over 1.1 million tonnes of plastic waste are generated each year, with only about 5% being collected for recycling. Without intentional measures, the waste problem will worsen. Advocacy, attitude changes, and policy interventions are essential to address this issue.

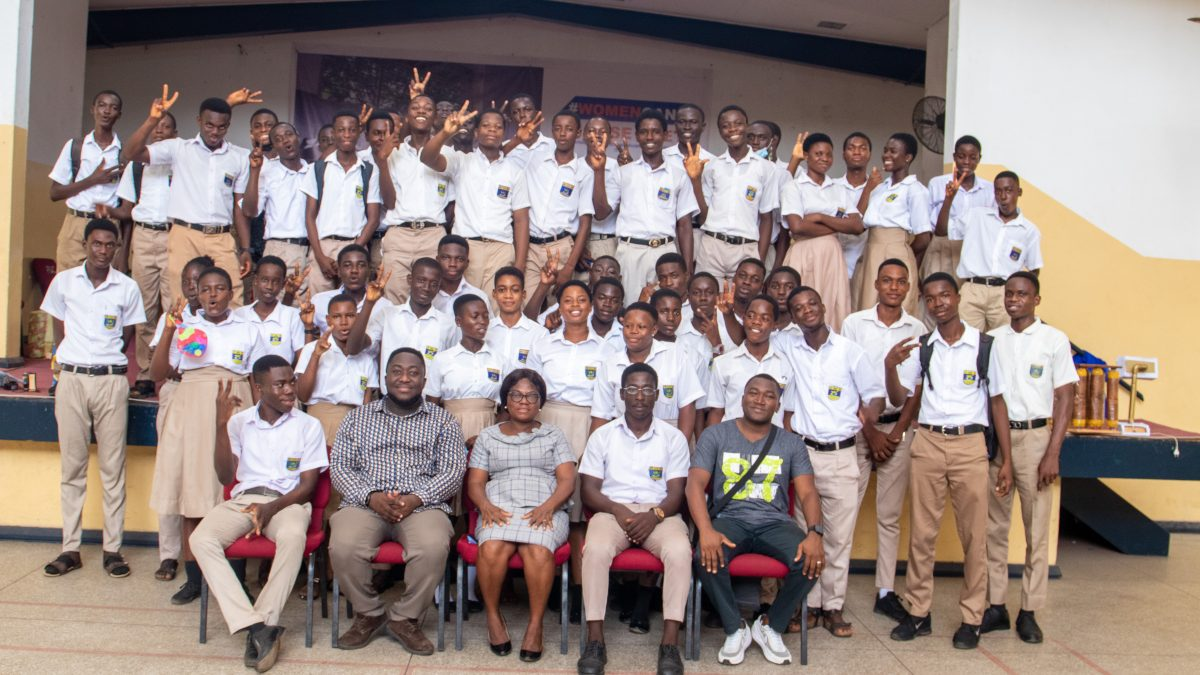

The Ghana Commission for UNESCO promotes simple actions that young people can take to reduce waste in their communities, homes, and schools. This outreach is often conducted through UNESCO Clubs in secondary and tertiary institutions. These clubs promote transformative education as outlined in SDG target 4.7, including education for sustainable development, global citizenship education, and health and well-being education.

On 12 March 2022, UNESCO Club members at Accra Technical Training Centre (ATTC) organized a trash hack campaign. The students showcased items such as hand-held fans, pencil/pen holders, bedroom lamps, air freshener dispensers, toys, and waterholes.

The Ghana Commission for UNESCO extends its gratitude to Mr. Arko Dometey (Principal, ATTC), Rev. Mordecai A. Nickson-Nubuor (Vice Principal Academics, ATTC), Mr. Theophilus Yaw Kofito (Vice Principal Administration, ATTC), Madam Theresa Amarquaye (Tutor & ATTC UNESCO Club Coordinator), Master Stephen Teye (UNESCO Club President, ATTC), and all club members for their efforts in making the campaign a success.

== Principal ==
As of July 2019 – Arc Arko Dometey.

== School Clubs and Societies ==
- Choir
- Robotics Club
- Cadet
- Maths And Science Club
- Scripture Union
- Brilliant Science And Mathematics Club (Brilla)
- Cybit Club (Infotech)
- Civic Education Club
- French Club
- German And Spanish Club
- Prayer Warrior
- Choreography Group
- Drama Club
- Cultural Groups
- Variety Shows And Musical Shows
- Brass Band
- Business Club
- Science Club
- Ghana Red Cross Society
- General Arts Students' Association
- Writer's Association
- Drama And Debater's Club
- National Union Of Presbyterian Students Of Ghana (N.U.P.S.G.)
- Catholic Anglican Students Union (C.A.S.U)
- Pentecost Students Union (Pensa)
- Ghana Methodist Student Union (Ghamsu)
- Seventh Day Adventist Student Union (Sdasu)
- Student Success Fellowship ( S.S.F)
- National Commission For Civic Education( Ncce)
- History Club
- Green Earth Organisation (Geo)
- Junior Achievement Club
- Tae Kwando Club
- Art Renaissance And Cultural Club.

== Sport Activities ==
- Football
- Volley
- Basket
- Handball
- Netball
- Hockey
- Athletics
- Volleyball
- Track-And-Field
- Table Tennis.

== Programmes ==
Accra Technical Training Center

Location
- Accra, Kokomlemle; P.O. Box MB 177, Accra; Ghana; 5.5739286°N 0.2090241°W

Information
- Type: High School (Solely Day)
- Motto: Training Industry Progress
- Opened: July 1966
- Founder: Governments of Ghana and Canada
- Status: Active
- Gender: Boys
- Enrollment: Yearly

=== Core Study Areas ===
- English / Liberal Studies
- Integrated Science
- Mathematics
- Information Communication & Technology
- ICT
- Technical drawing

=== Elective Programme Areas ===
- Architectural Drafting
- Auto Body Repairs
- Building Construction Technology
- Business System Technician
- Computer Technology
- Construction Technician Programme
- Creative Art Technology
- Electrical engineering technology
- Electronics Engineering
- Fashion
- Industrial Maintenance
- Mechanical engineering technology
- Motor Vehicle Technology
- Plumbing and Gas Fitting Technology
- Refrigeration and Air-Condition Technology
- Small Engine Repairs
- Welding and Fabrication Technology
- Wood Construction Technology

=== Training Workers for Industry ===
The ATTC has been organising short two-week courses for industry since 1994. This was set up with the support of the French government at that time. Courses include hydraulics, industrial electricals, pneumatics, programmable logic controllers, refrigeration, welding, and meteorology (World Bank, 2014).
