= Boakla =

- Country: Burkina Faso
- Region: Centre-Est Region
- Province: Boulgou Province
- Department: Bagré Department

Population (2019)
  - Total: 3,511

Boakla is a village in the Bagré Department of Boulgou Province in south-eastern Burkina Faso.

Population
Year	Pop.	±%
2006	2,169	—
2019	3,511	+61.9%
