= Dirlakou =

- Country: Burkina Faso
- Region: Centre-Est Region
- Province: Boulgou Province
- Department: Bagré Department

Population (2019)
  - Total: 11,581

Dirlakou is a town in the Bagré Department of Boulgou Province in south-eastern Burkina Faso.

Population
Year	Pop.	±%
2006	11,387	—
2019	11,581	+1.7%
