= 2009 West Africa floods =

2009 floods in 12 West African countries

Coordinates: 12°21′N 1°32′W

Meteorological history
- Duration: June–September 2009

Overall effects
- Fatalities: At least 193 deaths
- Damage: At least $152 million
- Areas affected: Benin, Burkina Faso, Gambia, Ghana, Guinea, Ivory Coast, Liberia, Mali, Mauritania, Niger, Senegal, Sierra Leone

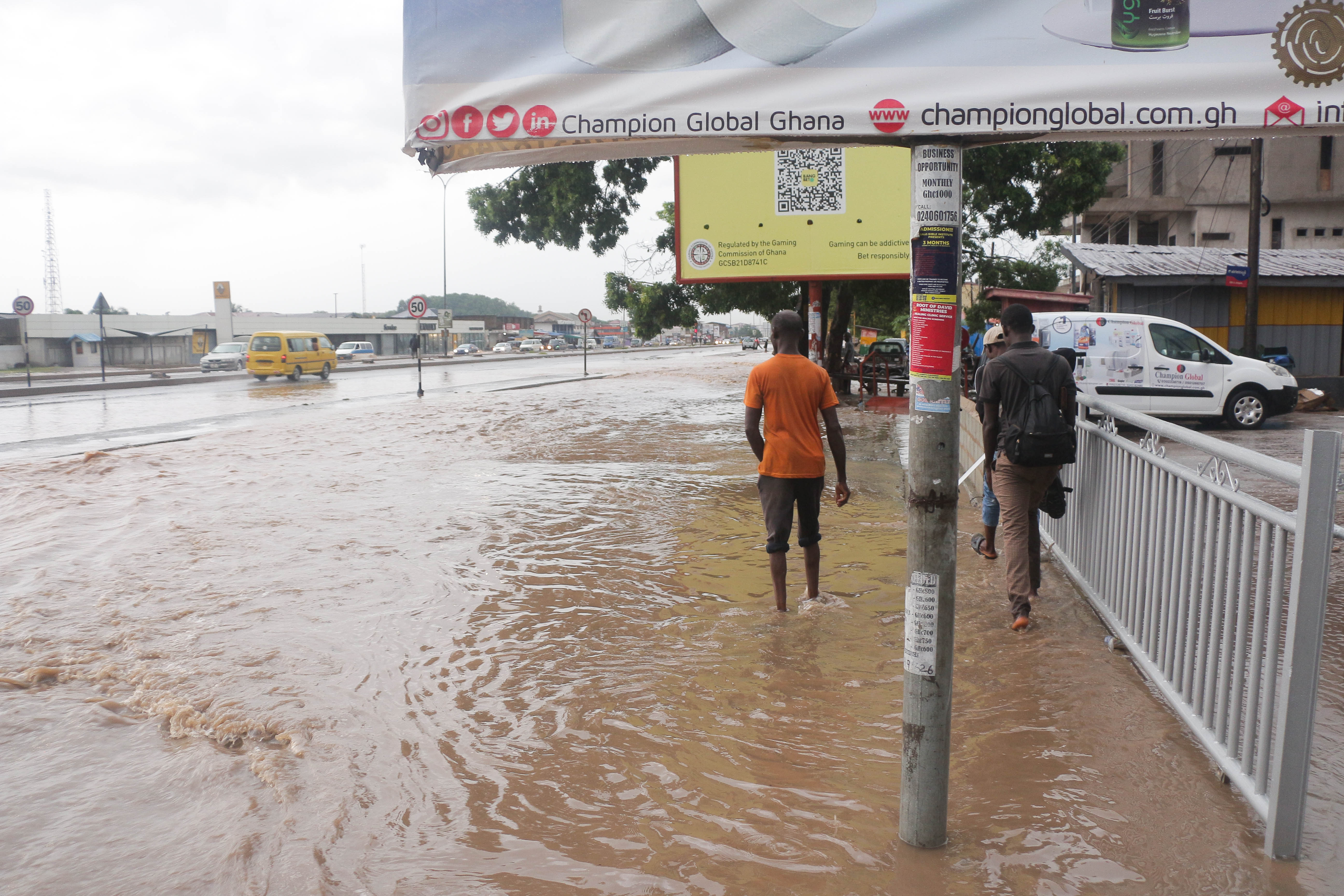
Some part of Accra was flooded during the rainy season

The 2009 West Africa floods are a natural disaster that began in June 2009 as a consequence of exceptionally heavy seasonal rainfall in large areas of West Africa. Several rivers, including the Pendjari, Niger, Volta and Senegal rivers, broke their banks, causing destruction of houses, bridges, roads and crops. The floods are reported to have affected 940,000 people across 12 countries, including Burkina Faso, Benin, Ghana, Niger, Senegal, Guinea, and caused the deaths of at least 193 people. In Burkina Faso, one of the most affected countries, 150,000 people fled their homes, mostly in the capital Ouagadougou where rainfall in one day was equal to 25% of normal annual rainfall for the whole country.

== Seasonal rainfall ==
Countries in West Africa and the southern Sahel get most of their annual rainfall during the boreal summer months from June to September. This rainy season, also known as the West African monsoon, is associated with a seasonal reversal of prevailing winds in the lower atmosphere, where moist air is blown in from the Atlantic Ocean and released over the continent.

The exceptionally heavy rainfall experienced in West Africa during the 2009 monsoon season is associated with the periodic warming of the Pacific Ocean, a phenomenon known as El Niño, which affects weather worldwide.

== Damages and victims ==
=== Benin ===
220,000 people have been affected, mostly in coastal areas, and 7 people are reported to have died.

=== Burkina Faso ===
150,000 persons displaced and 8 were killed following the heaviest rainfall seen in the country's capital Ouagadougou in 90 years. An estimated 110,000 people were displaced after a dam break of the Loumbila reservoir located in the center of Ouagadougou.

In the south of the country, the Bagre Dam had to open its main gate as water reached maximum safety levels on 4 September. The resulting increase in water flow is threatening large areas along the shores of the Volta river in southern Burkina Faso and northern Ghana.

=== Gambia ===
In Gambia 15,617 people were affected by floods.

=== Ghana ===
139,790 have been affected, and at least 24 killed. 139,709 have been affected by flood

=== Guinea ===
40,000 people have been affected in the capital Conakry and the towns of Kindia and Siguiri.

=== Ivory Coast ===
Torrential rains, causing mudslides and floods, killed at least 19 people in the capital Abidjan and affected around 2000 people.

=== Liberia ===
In Liberia 584 people were affected by floods, leaving 2 deaths.

=== Mali ===
In Mali 18,902 people were affected by the floods.

=== Mauritania ===
3,000 persons were left homeless due to floods in the city of Rosso, located on the banks of the Senegal River. An estimated total of 9000 people were affected in the country.

=== Niger ===
Flash floods, following 4 days of intense rainfall in Niger's northern Aïr Mountains affected 3,500 homes in Agadez and surrounding areas, causing 2 deaths, and losses in livestock and crops. The total number of affected people has mounted to 79,129 and 3 deaths.

=== Senegal ===
30,000 households have been affected by floods in the capital Dakar and other parts of the country, with an estimated 264,000 affected and 6 deaths.

=== Sierra Leone ===
Floods caused by two weeks of heavy rainfall in August, left 15 deaths and 425 displaced in Freetown. Crops were washed away in six villages in the Kambia District. The total number of affected people in the country is reported to be 1,455 with 103 deaths.

== See also ==
- 2007 African floods
- 2010 Sahel famine
- 2010 Nigerien floods
