= Guingale =

- Country: Burkina Faso
- Region: Centre-Est Region
- Province: Boulgou Province
- Department: Bagré Department

Population (2019)
  - Total: 1,286

Guingale is a town in the Bagré Department of Boulgou Province in south-eastern Burkina Faso.

Population
Year	Pop.	±%
2006	1,166	—
2019	1,286	+10.3%
