= Goudayere =

- Country: Burkina Faso
- Region: Centre-Est Region
- Province: Boulgou Province
- Department: Bagré Department

Population (2019)
  - Total: 1,393

Goudayere is a town in the Bagré Department of Boulgou Province in south-eastern Burkina Faso.

Population
Year	Pop.	±%
2006	672	—
2019	1,393	+107.3%
