= Bagré Department =

Coordinates: 11°29′01″N 0°31′06″W

Bagré
- Department
- Interactive map of Bagré
- Country: Burkina Faso
- Region: Centre-Est Region
- Province: Boulgou Province

Area
  - Total: 219.6 sq mi (568.8 km^{2})

Population (2019 census)
  - Total: 37,855
  - Density: 172.4/sq mi (66.55/km^{2})
- Time zone: UTC+0 (GMT 0)

Bagré is a department or commune of Boulgou Province in eastern Burkina Faso. Its capital lies at the town of Bagré. According to the 2006 census, actualized for the municipal élections of 2019, the department has a total population of 37,855.

The region is well known for its rice farms and for the artificial lake close to the village of Bagré.

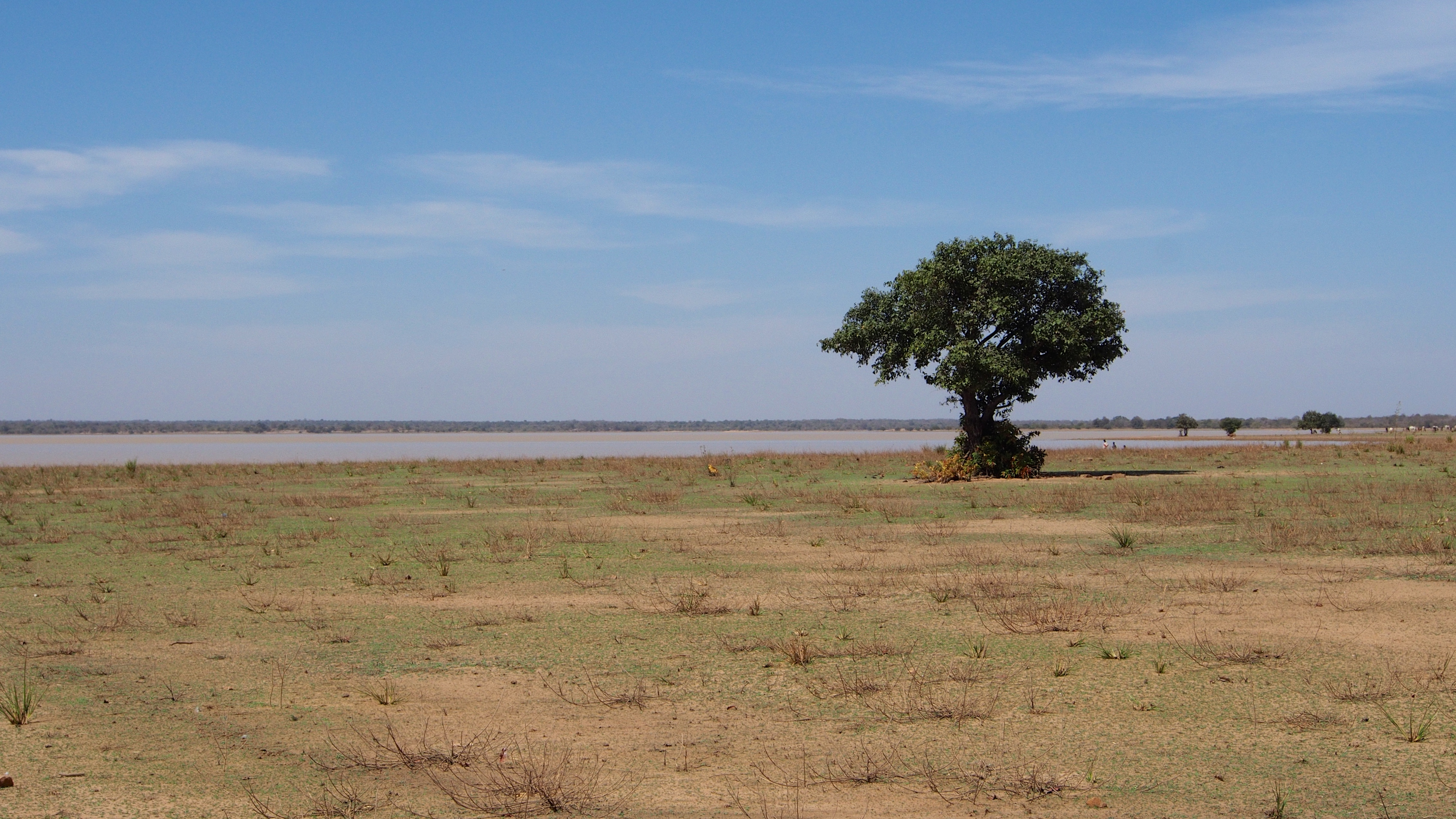
the Bagré lake

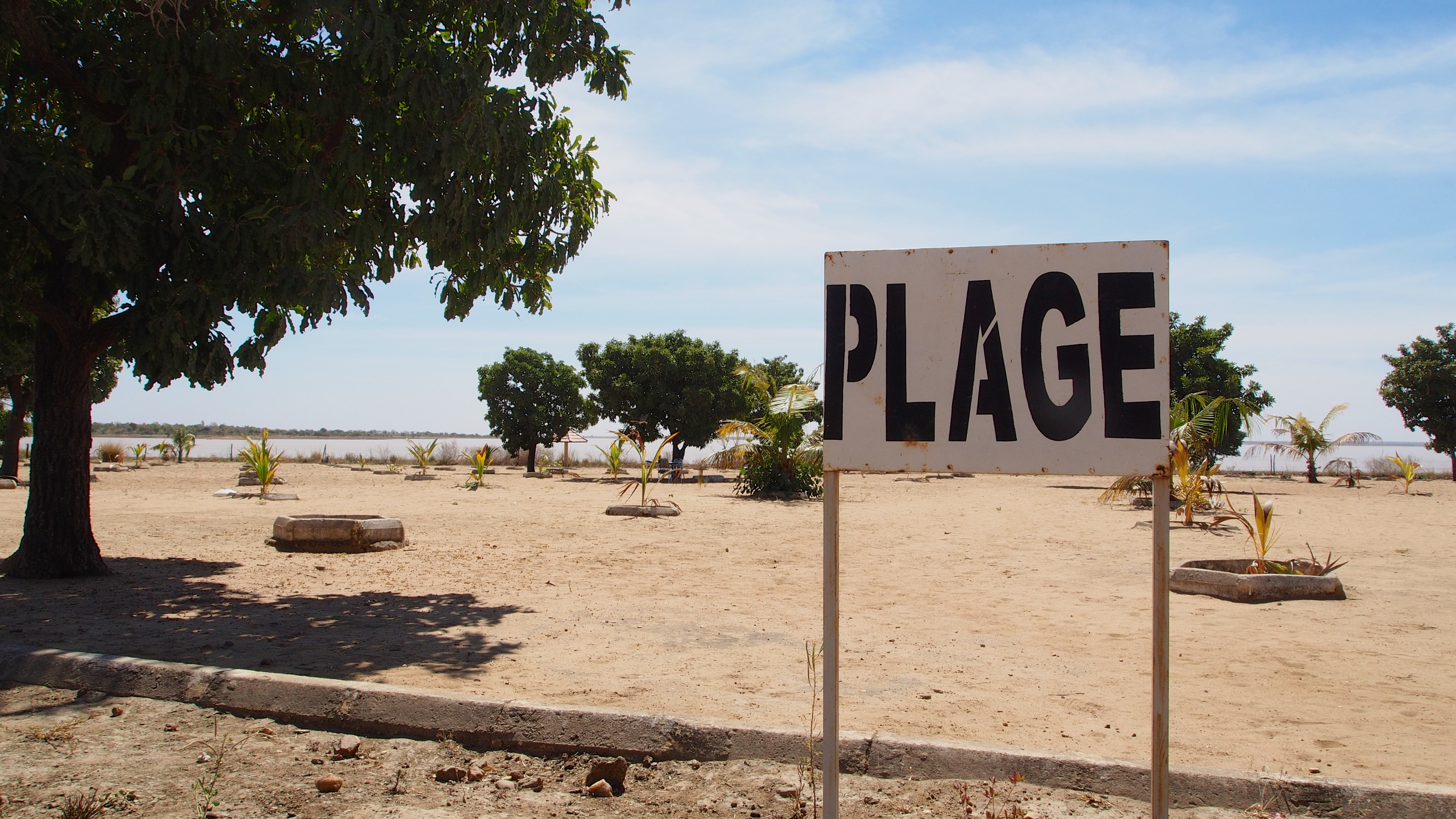
the beach of Bagré

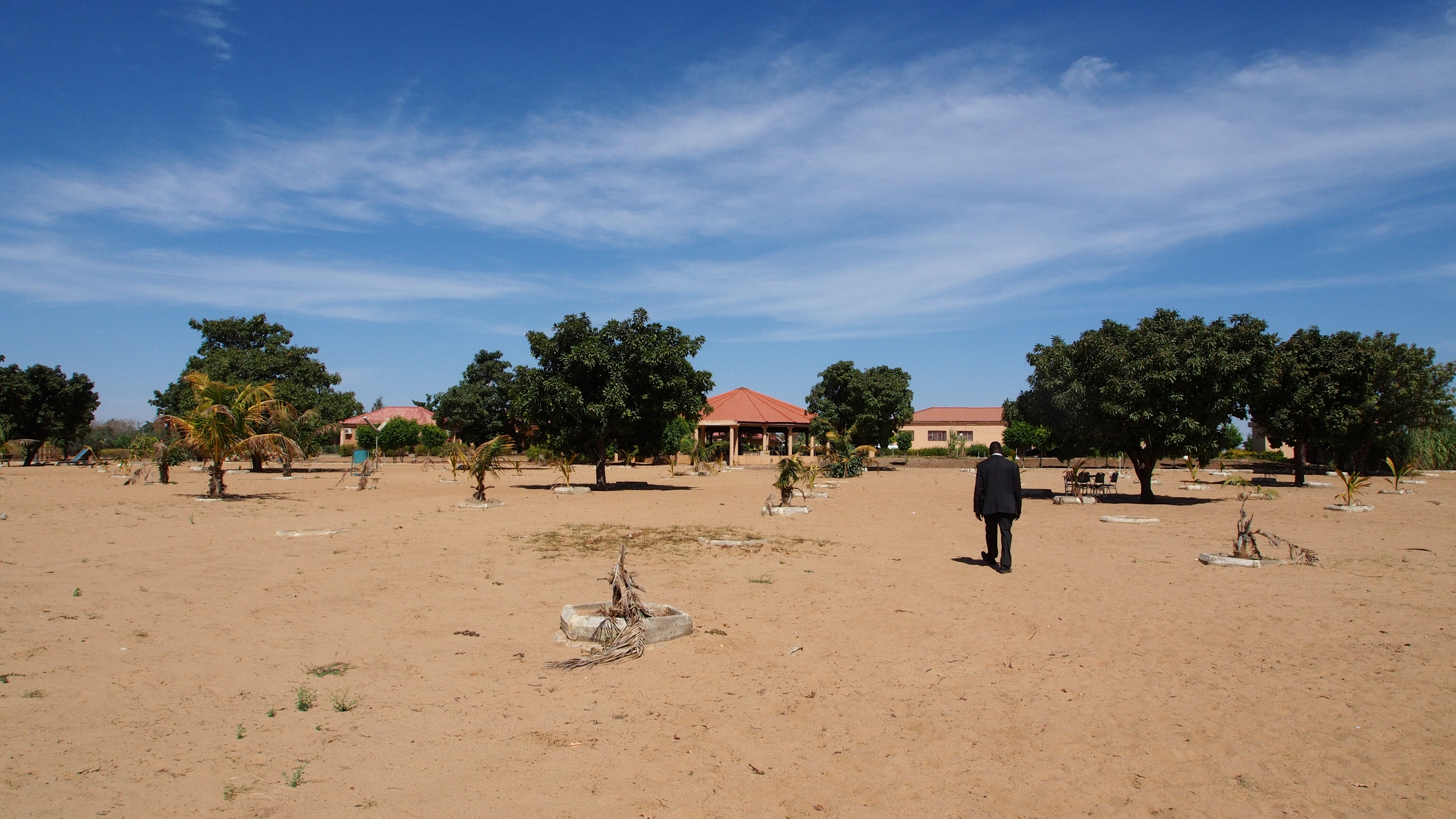
tourist center and lodge of Bagré

== Towns and villages ==
- Bagré (or Bagré-Village) (4 993 inhabitants) (capital)
- Boakla (2 169 inhabitants)
- Dirlakou (11 387 inhabitants)
- Goudayere (672 inhabitants)
- Guingale (1 166inhabitants)
- Sangaboule (1 627 inhabitants)
- Yambo (3 9 32 inhabitants)
- Zabo (3 218 inhabitants)

(populations as of 2012)
