= Overgrazing =

When plants are grazed for extended periods without sufficient recovery time

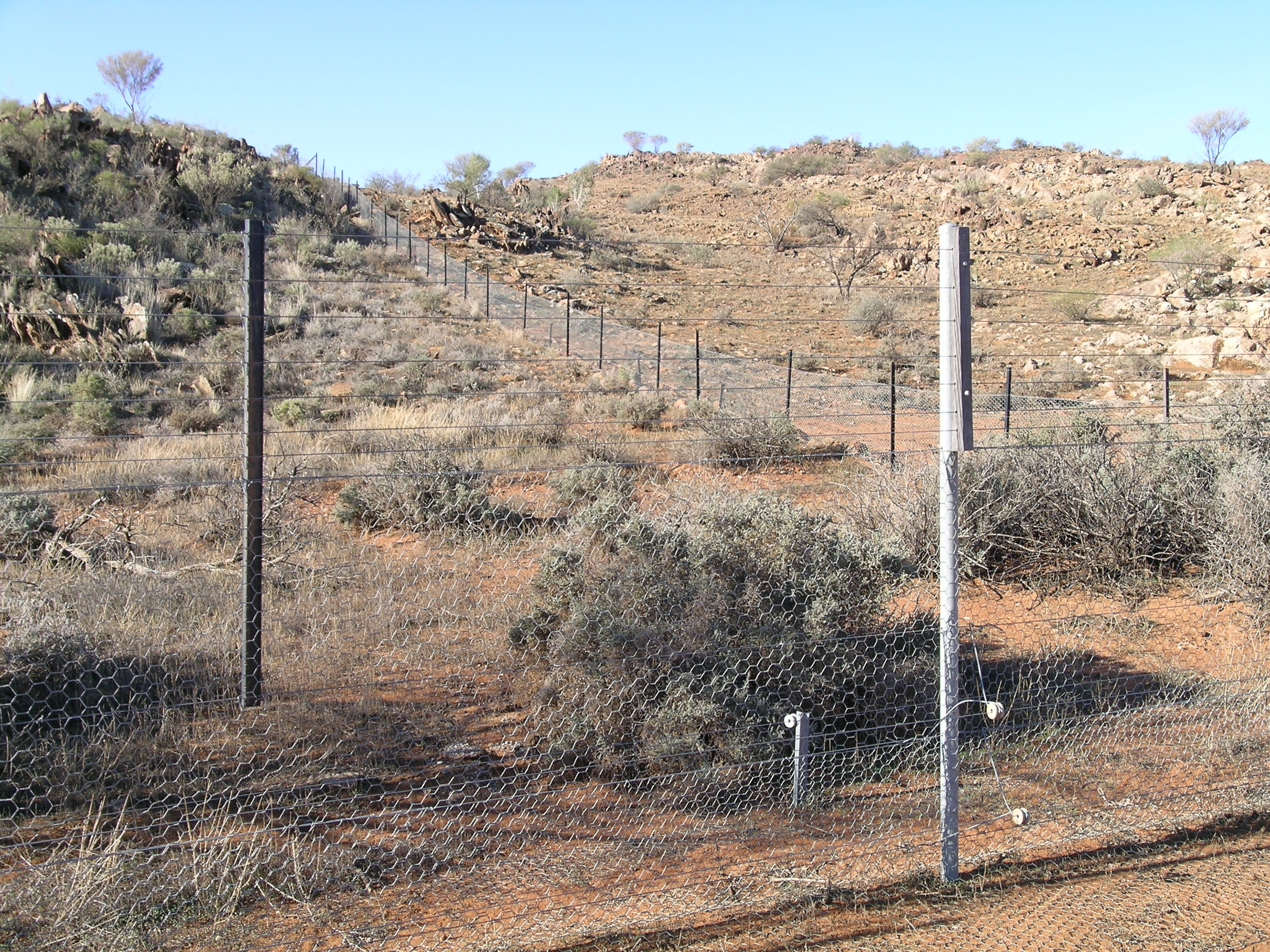
Overgrazed area in western New South Wales (Australia), by loss of native flora, in the upper right corner

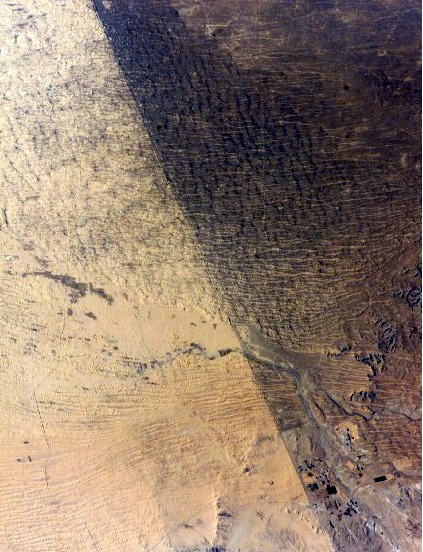
Satellite image of the border between Israel and Egypt. The Egyptian side, to the left, is overgrazed.

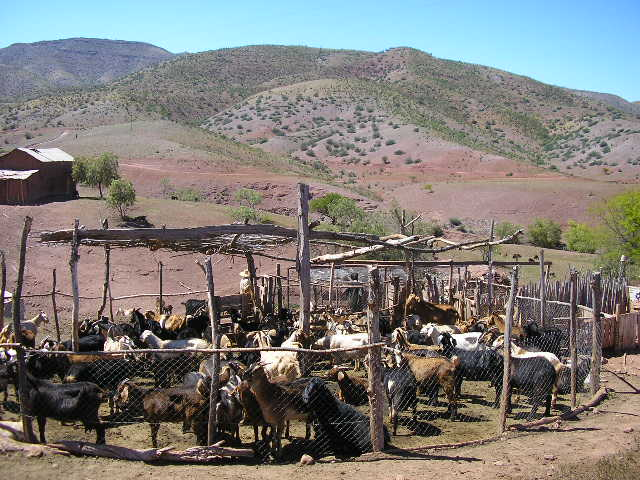
Penned goats in an overgrazed landscape (Norte Chico, Chile)

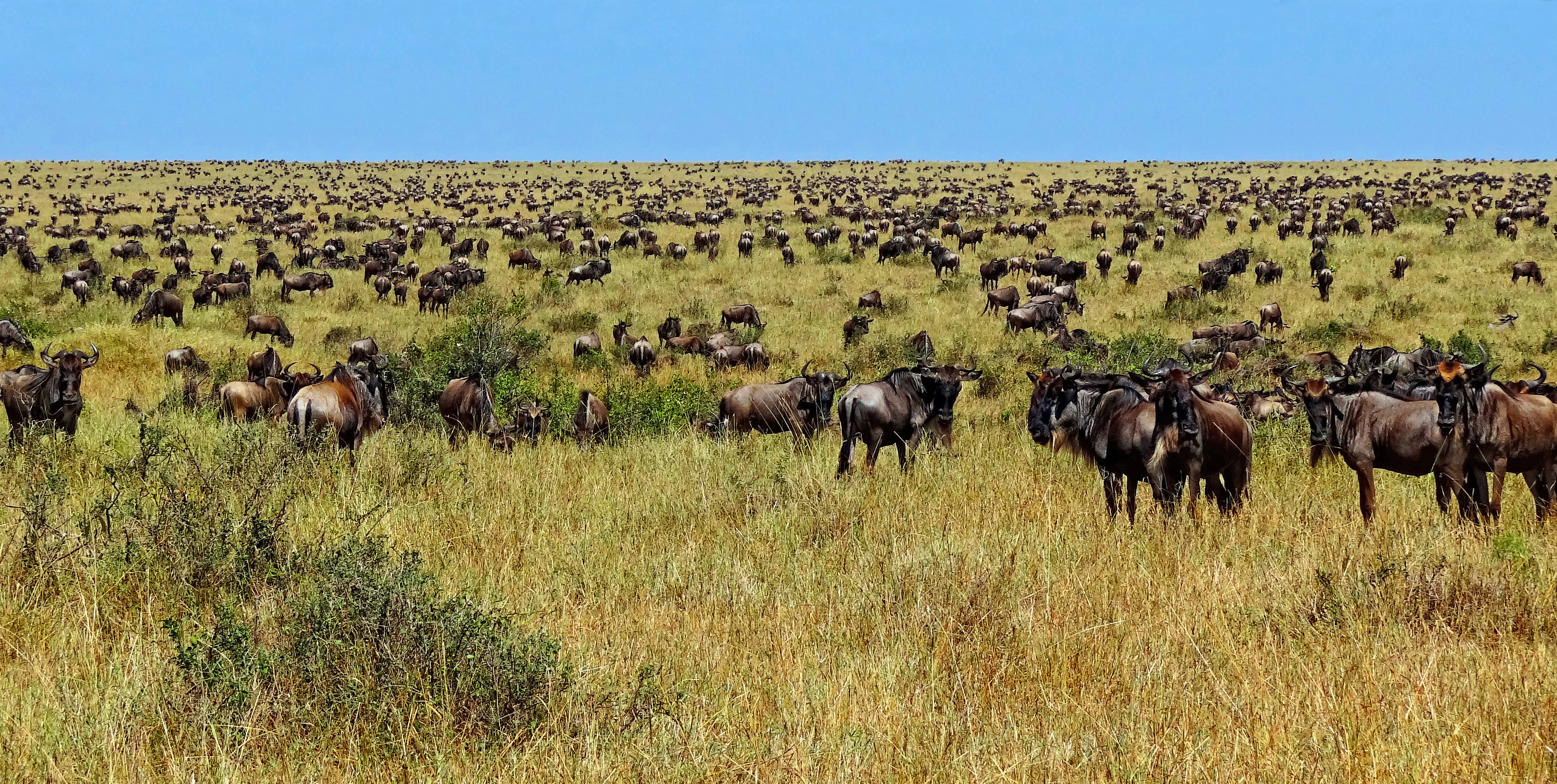
Huge herd of migratory wildebeest in Masai Mara during their annual migration shows landscape not overgrazed

Overgrazing occurs when plants are exposed to intensive grazing for extended periods of time, or without sufficient recovery periods. It can be caused by either livestock in poorly managed agricultural applications, game reserves, or nature reserves. It can also be caused by immobile, travel restricted populations of native or non-native wild animals.

Overgrazing reduces the usefulness, productivity and biodiversity of the land and is one cause of desertification and erosion. Overgrazing is also seen as a cause of the spread of invasive species of non-native plants and of weeds. Degrading land, emissions from animal agriculture and reducing the biomass in an ecosystem contribute directly to climate change between grazing events.

== Ecological impact ==
Overgrazing typically increases soil erosion.

With continued overutilization of land for grazing, there is an increase in degradation. This leads to poor soil conditions that only xeric and early successional species can tolerate. A meta-analysis of 148 studies found that the value of most ecosystem functions declines with increasing grazing intensity and that increasing aridity weakens positive impacts of light grazing.

Native plant grass species, both individual bunch grasses and in grasslands, are especially vulnerable. For example, excessive browsing by white-tailed deer can lead to the growth of less preferred species of grasses and ferns or non-native plant species that can potentially displace native, woody plants, decreasing the biodiversity.

== Economic theory ==
Overgrazing is used as an example in the economic concept now known as the Tragedy of the Commons devised in a 1968 paper by Garrett Hardin. This cited the work of a Victorian economist who used as an example the over-grazing of common land. Hardin's example could only apply to unregulated use of land regarded as a common resource.

Normally, rights of use of common land in England and Wales were, and still are, closely regulated, and available only to "commoners". If excessive use was made of common land, for example in overgrazing, a common would be "stinted", that is, a limit would be put on the number of animals each commoner was allowed to graze. These regulations were responsive to demographic and economic pressure; thus rather than let a common become degraded, access was restricted even further. This important part of actual historic practice was absent from the economic model of Hardin. In reality the use of common land in England and Wales was a triumph of conserving a scarce resource using agreed custom and practice.

== By region ==
=== Africa-Sahel region ===
There have been overgrazing consequences in the Sahel region. The violent herder–farmer conflicts in Nigeria, Mali, Sudan and other countries in the Sahel region have been exacerbated by land degradation and overgrazing. See 2010 Sahel famine.

=== Sub-Sahara Africa ===
Various countries in Sub-Sahara Africa are affected by overgrazing and resulting ecological effects. In Namibia, overgrazing is considered the main cause of woody plant encroachment at the expenses of grasses on a land area of up to 45 million hectares.

=== Australia ===
In many arid zones in Australia, overgrazing by sheep and cattle during the 19th century, as pastoralism was introduced by European settlers, caused many long-lived species of trees and shrubs to give way to short-lived annual plants and weed species. Introduced feral rabbits, cats and foxes exacerbated the threat to both flora and fauna. Many bird species have become extinct or endangered, and many of the medium-sized desert mammals are now completely extinct or only exist on a few islands of Australia.

Overgrazing can also occur with native species. In the Australian Capital Territory, the local government in 2013 authorised a cull of 1455 kangaroos due to overgrazing. Maisie Carr (1912-1988), Ecologist and Botanist, undertook significant research and studies in overgrazing and established consequences on the surrounding land in Australia.

=== Caribbean ===
In the Caribbean region, overgrazing is a threat to vegetation areas where there is livestock farming, which is an important source of livelihood and food security for many people. a combination of small scale livestock farming with small ruminants, and mixed farming is practised. However, livestock consume vegetation faster than it can be renewed and this leads to land degradation, loss of vegetative areas, and soil erosion resulting in poor quality feed and reduced livestock yields and income. Also, these grazing lands are critical in controlling carbon dioxide and mitigating risks against severe weather such as floods and droughts. Overgrazing weakens ecological conservation.

=== New Zealand ===
In New Zealand, overgrazing is a massive threat to the native species of flora and fauna, especially the native bushes which are often overlooked by invasive species looking for homes. Mustelids, rabbits, hares and possums often eat the plants that hold soil together. This makes the ground very unstable and crumbly. If soil is unstable, it is prone to collapse in extreme weather events such as floods and heavy rain. This is detrimental to farmers of crops and animals alike. 40% of the native species of New Zealand have been wiped out by pests including humans.

== See also ==
- Cultured meat
- Desertification
- Land degradation
