= Bagré Village =

Bagré
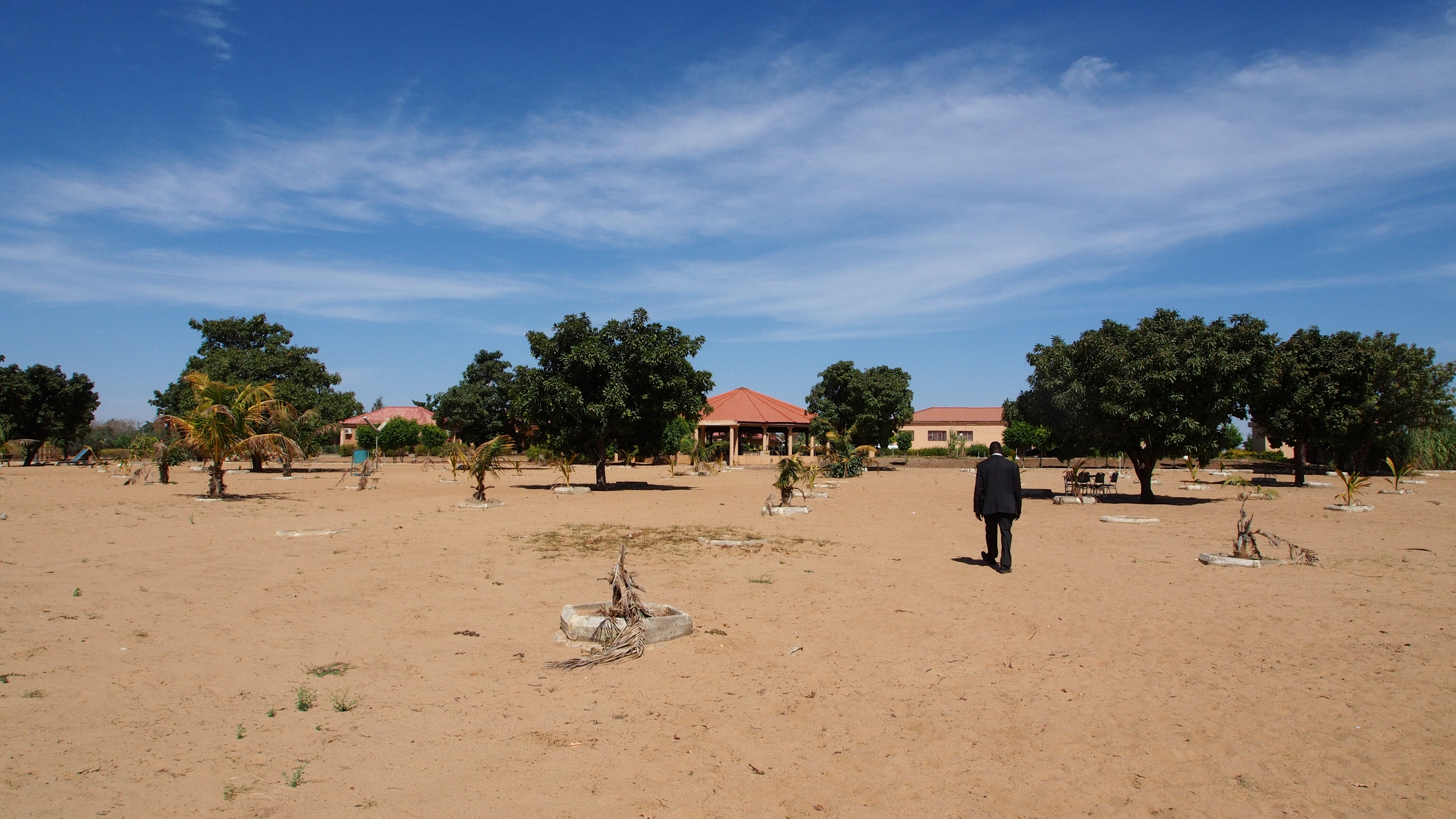
- tourist center of Bagré
- Nickname: Bagré-Village
- Location in Burkina Faso
- Coordinates: 11°29′24″N 0°31′23″W
- Country: Burkina Faso
- Region: Centre-Est Region
- Province: Boulgou Province
- Department: Bagré Department
- Elevation: 298 m (978 ft)

Population (2019)
  - Total: 6,990

Bagré (or Bagré-Village) is a village and seat of the Bagré Department of Boulgou Province in south-eastern Burkina Faso.

Population
Year	Pop.	±%
1985	5,174	—
2006	4,993	−3.5%
2019	6,990	+40.0%
