= Permanent Interstate Committee for drought control in the Sahel =

International organization in West Africa

Map of members

The Permanent Interstate Committee for Drought Control in the Sahel (French: Comité permanent inter-État de lutte contre la sécheresse au Sahel, abbreviated as CILSS) is an international organization consisting of countries in the Sahel region of Africa.

== Overview ==
According to the official homepage, the organization's mandate is to invest in research for food security and the fight against the effects of drought and desertification for a new ecological balance in the Sahel.

The Sahel is a transition area between the very dry North and tropical forests on the coast. It mostly displays bushes, herbs and very small trees and does not offer regular harvests to its inhabitants. Main characteristics include:

- a very irregular and little predictable rainfall, from 200 mm to 2500 mm
- predominance of agriculture and husbandry. More than half of the inhabitants are farmers and agriculture contributes more than 40% to the GDP
- high demographic growth (around 3.1%) and high urban growth (around 7%)

The CILSS was created in 1973 during the first great drought in the region with the aim of mobilizing the population in the Sahel and the international community to facilitate urgent need and the organization of works in various domains i.e. rainfed and irrigated agriculture, environment, transport, and communication. In 1995 it centered its activities on basic food security and the use of natural resources.

The executive office is located in Ouagadougou, Burkina Faso.

List of countries that are a member:

- Benin
- Burkina Faso
- Cape Verde
- Chad
- Gambia
- Guinea
- Guinea-Bissau
- Ivory Coast
- Mali
- Mauritania
- Niger
- Senegal
- Togo

== See also ==
- 2010 Sahel famine
