= 2012 Sahel drought =

2012 drought in the Sahel

2012 had a very severe drought in the Sahel, the semiarid region of Africa that lies between the Sahara and the savannas. Countries included in this region are Senegal, Mauritania, Mali, Burkina Faso, Niger, Nigeria, Chad, Sudan, and Eritrea. Droughts in the Sahel occur quite often and tend to reduce the already meager water supply and stress the economies of developing countries in that region.

== Future droughts of the Sahel region ==
The droughts are becoming increasingly more common, worse and more threatening due to global warming. A possible explanation to the aridity trend is the supplements of an oceanography phenomenon called El Niño. An idea is that evaporation is occurring at higher rate due to the change in sea surface temperature, which then impacts the amount of rain the Sahel region receives. Another factor to keep into consideration is the response of Earth's atmosphere to stimulants like greenhouse gases and carbon emissions.

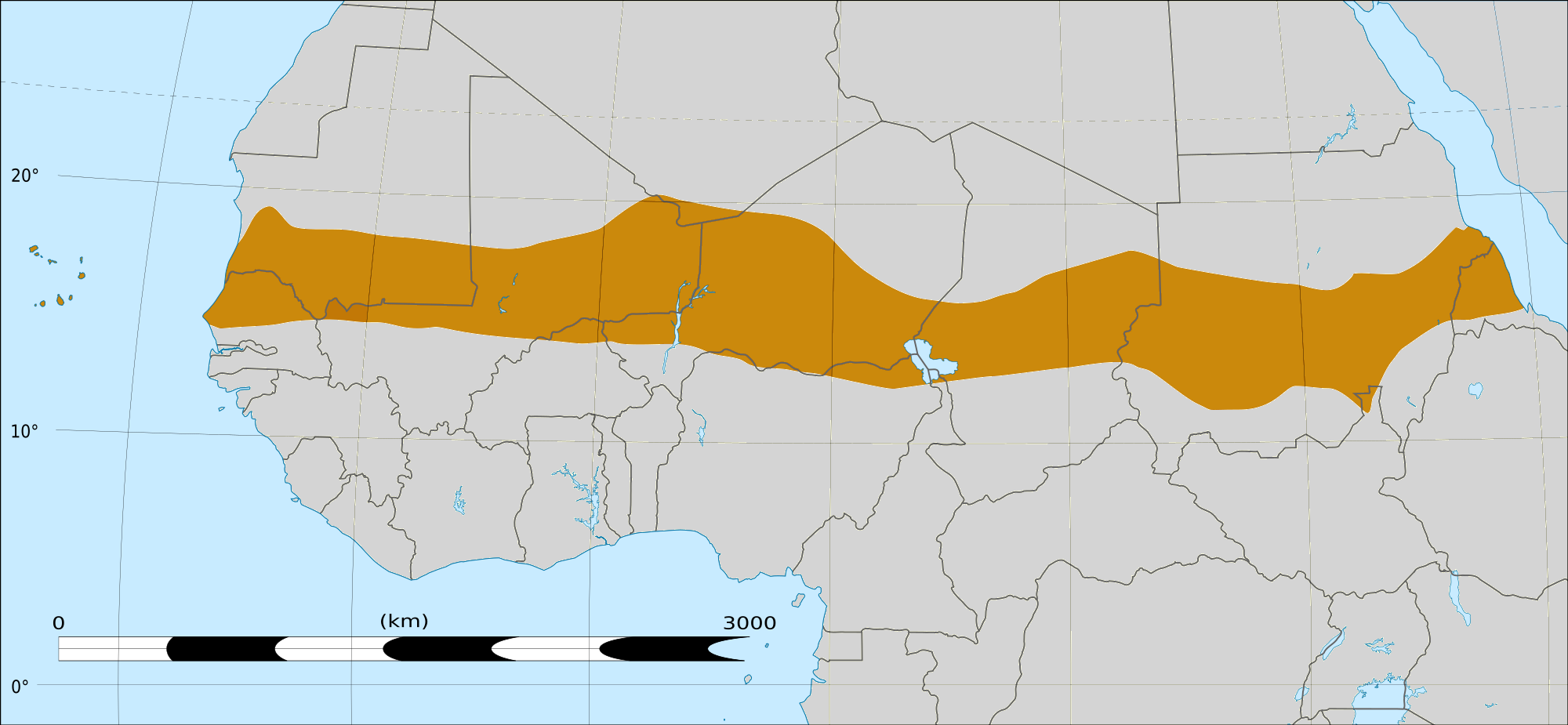
The Sahel region – a belt up to 1,000 km wide that spans Africa from the Atlantic Ocean to the Red Sea

== Societal impacts ==
=== Mass famine ===
Valerie Amos, UN Humanitarian Chief during 2012, released a statement during the year stating that over 15 million people were malnourished in West Africa and the Sahel region. The main contributor to the famine was the drought of Sahel, ensued from a combination of failing crops and El Niño.

Mauritania and Chad recorded a loss in crop yield of over 50% when compared to 2011. Food reserves in the areas affected were very low and combined with corn prices soaring by 60-85% compared to averages over the last five years. In Chad alone this food crisis affected some 3.6 million people. In places like Burkina Faso over 2.8 million were suffering from famine and in Senegal over 800,000 did not have enough to eat.
