= Bas Saharan Basin =

North African aquifer

The Bas Saharan Basin (Arabic: حوض الصحراء) is an artesian aquifer system which covers most of the Algerian and Tunisian Sahara and extends to Libya, enclosing the whole of the Grand Erg Oriental.
