= Bagre Dam =

Dam in Bukrina Faso

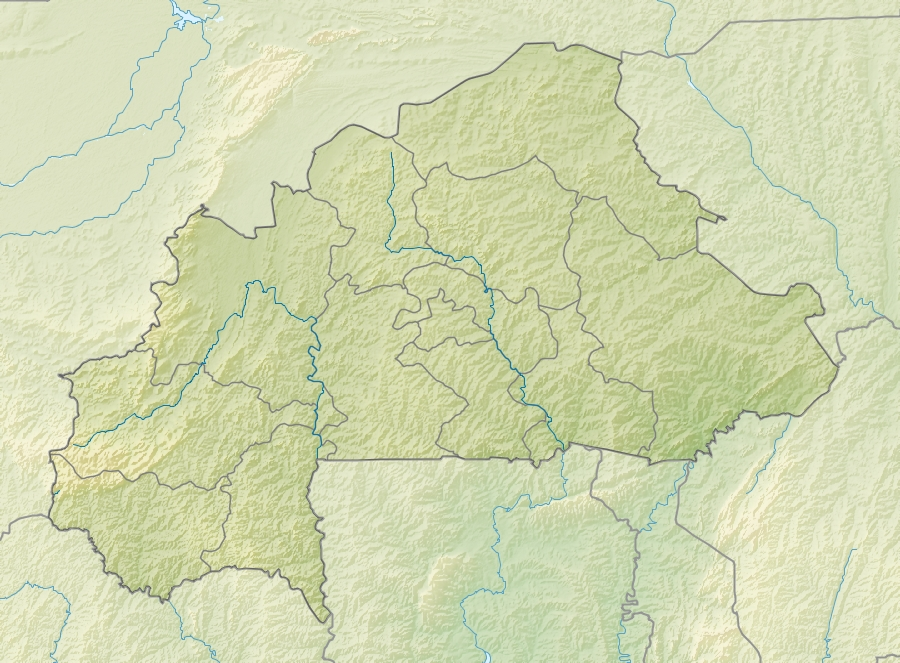
- Location within Burkina Faso
- Country: Burkina Faso
- Location: Bagré Village
- Coordinates: 11°28′36.78″N 0°32′48.10″W
- Purpose: Power
- Status: Operational
- Opening date: 1992
- Construction cost: 67 million CFA
- Operator: Sonabel

Dam and spillways
- Impounds: White Volta

Reservoir
- Total capacity: 7,000,000,000 m^{3} (5,700,000 acre⋅ft)
- Maximum length: 400 km (250 mi)

Power Station
- Turbines: 2
- Installed capacity: 16 MW

Ramsar Wetland
- Official name: Barrage de Bagre
- Designated: 7 October 2009
- Reference no.: 1874

Bagre Dam is a multipurpose dam on the White Volta located near Bagré Village in Burkina Faso.

== History ==
The Dam was constructed in 1992 at a cost of 67 million CFA from the World Bank.
