= Afrol =

African independent news agency

afrol News
- Industry: Media
- Genre: News agency
- Founded: 2000
- Headquarters: Africa
- Area served: Africa
- Website: afrol.com

afrol News is an independent news agency, established in 2000, that exclusively covers the African continent, publishing an online news portal in the English, French, Spanish and Portuguese languages.

== Type of coverage ==
On 25 May 2010, the agency reported that about two million Chadians were at risk of having a famine occur in their regions after the combined effects of two years of drought and pestilence had ruined their harvest yet again.
