= Yambo, Burkina Faso =

Yambo
- Country: Burkina Faso
- Region: Centre-Est Region
- Province: Boulgou Province
- Department: Bagré Department

Population (2019)
  - Total: 5,882

Yambo, Burkina Faso is a town in the Bagré Department of Boulgou Province in south-eastern Burkina Faso.

Population
Year	Pop.	±%
2006	3,932	—
2019	5,882	+49.6%
