= 2009–10 Albanian floods =

2009–2010 flooding in northern Albania

Several periods of major flooding affected the northern regions of Albania around Shkodra, Lezhë and Durrës between December 2009 and January 2010.

== Description ==
On December 3, 2009, the Northwestern regions of Shkodër, Lezhë and Durrës were inundated as a result of increased rainfall and higher temperatures in Albania. Deforestation in the region is also considered a primary cause for the increased amount of groundwater in the lowlands.

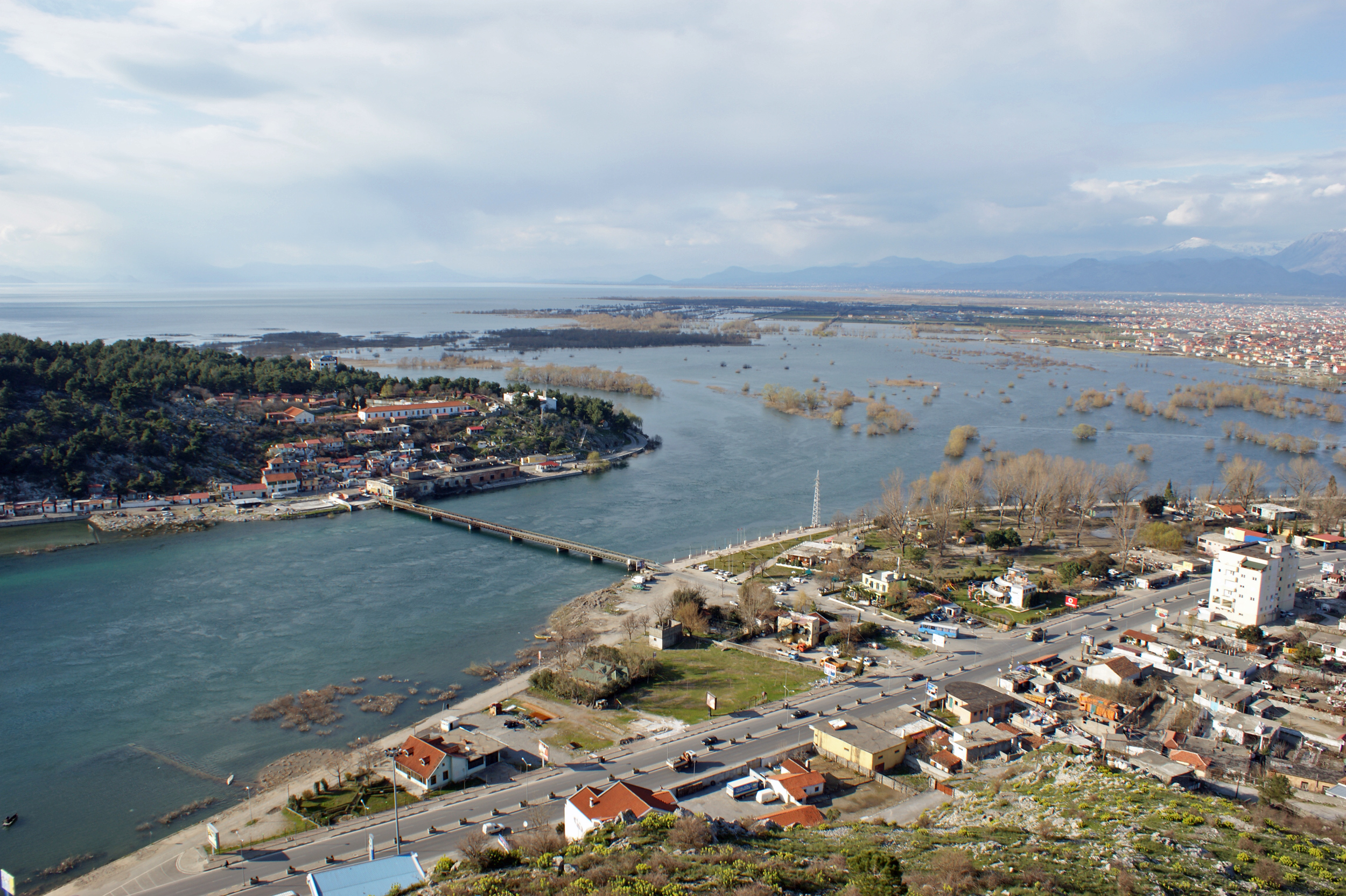
Flooded areas seen from Shkodra Caste, March 2010

On January 11, 2010, the Northwestern regions of Shkodër and Lezhë were inundated as a result of increased rainfall and higher temperatures in Albania. Flooding nearly 2,500 houses and evacuating more than 5,300 residents (as reported by the United Nations Office for the Coordination of Humanitarian Affairs), the flood has led to sustained damage in the nearby water supply, roads, bridges, and more than 10,500 hectares (26,000 acres) of agrarian land. Approximately 6,000 individuals in flood-infested areas refused to abandon residences and livestock, forcing the government to take action by enforcing evacuation. The Albanian government has also called for international assistance – initiating aid from organizations such as UNICEF, OCHA, and UNDP. Additional rainfall and snow continues to make water levels rise, which can be extrapolated to rise through the spring season.

== Detailed information ==
As a result of this increasing rainfall, the Drin river flow has been rapidly raising which has augmented the water level in three hydroelectric power lakes as reported by the DREF operation (International Federation's Disaster Relief Emergency Fund). Authorities were forced to release water from these lakes increasing the flooding situation in the Shkodër and Lezhë areas. Some initiatives have been put into place to help this situation such as the Red Cross Society of Albania, which plans on assisting 2,200 families with necessary basic food items lasting for three months.

The affected areas are parts of North western Albania with one primary hit zone being Shkodër, 120 kilometres (75 mi) away from the capital Tirana – located right beneath the three hydroelectric power lakes of Fierzë, Koman and Vau i Dejës. After being forced to release water from the dikes, the water flow grew to 2,450 cubic metres per second (87,000 cu ft/s) while the maximum capacity is only 800 cubic metres per second (28,000 cu ft/s).

The Albanian government declared it a "natural disaster" on 5 January 2010 when the flooding displaced thousands of people. The Shkodër District reached a critical situation as the water level on main roads entering into the region reached one meter and reached two meters inside the village of Berdices. The overflow of water alienated the city from national road access and cut communication with the town.

The Albanian government has used the army and police forces to help remove residents using boats and military vehicles. The Emergency Commission at Shkodër on 8 January 2010 reported an increase in the number of evacuations to 3,572 persons with 98% being accommodated by relatives. The government claimed that another 16,000 – 20,000 individuals need to be evacuated as more bad weather was predicted for the future.

== Aid ==
As an immediate relief, the Albanian government declared a "state of civil emergency" and founded an Inter-ministerial Committee. Organizations outside of the state such as the UN Office for the Coordination of Humanitarian Affairs (OCHA), the UN Children's Fund (UNICEF) and the UN Development Program (UNDP) have supported affected families with grants for food and other basic needs.

According to The Euro-Atlantic Disaster Response Coordination Center (EADRCC), an organization that presents disaster requests and updates, Albania officially requested for assistance on 7 January 2010. The country requested for transportation boats for shallow water, transport helicopters, high capacity water pumps, mobile power generators, fuel, food, and medicine on 7 January 2010. Later reports throughout the month of January that reveal where donations have come from and the quantity of each. In efforts to control future damage, British engineers advised the Albanian Government to control its North West rivers' flow by dredging out the silt and other contaminants due to the flood.

In addition to major organizational relief, around 1,200 individuals from the army, police, fire fighters and other state departments were deployed to assist the evacuation of people and their animals and provide health support, land protection, and to protect dams to reduce further flooding.

== Casualties ==
According to the International Federation of Red Cross and Red Crescent Studies, there were eight main regions that were affected including the Shkodër municipality, Dajç, Ana Malit, Bërdicë, Gur i Zi, Bushat, Velipojë, and Qendër. The preliminary casualties in these regions reflect 9,150 hectares (22,600 acres) of land flooded, 3,572 people evacuated from their homes, and 2,200 houses damaged by flooding. The Albanian government originally reported on 7 January that in the upcoming days, 3,000–3,500 additional families will have to be evacuated. The majority of displaced families were sheltered in student dormitories provided by the government. The other families, however, were sheltered by relatives and friends.

Preliminary assessments of damage conducted by the Albania Red Cross (Kryqi i Kuq Shqiptar) revealed multiple damages to households and farmland including houses, home equipment and furniture, winter reserves of corn and vegetables, livestock and livestock food, and corn plants.
