= Zabo, Burkina Faso =

Zabo
- Country: Burkina Faso
- Region: Centre-Est Region
- Province: Boulgou Province
- Department: Bagré Department

Population (2019)
  - Total: 4,767

Zabo is a town in the Bagré Department of Boulgou Province in south-eastern Burkina Faso.

The Town is famous locally for its drinking water.

Population
| Year | Pop. | ±% |
|---|---|---|
| 1985 | 1,925 | — |
| 2006 | 3,218 | +67.2% |
| 2019 | 4,767 | +48.1% |
