= Ghana Red Cross Society =

Humanitarian organization

- Founded: 1958
- Type: Non-profit organisation
- Purpose: Humanitarian Aid
- Location: Ghana
- Affiliations: International Committee of the Red Cross; International Federation of Red Cross and Red Crescent Societies

The Ghana Red Cross Society, also known as GRCS, is an international humanitarian organization which was established by an act of Parliament (Act 10 of 1958), thus the GRCS was founded in 1958. The Ghana Red Cross Society is affiliated to the International Federation of the Red Cross and Red Crescent (IFRC). It has its headquarters in Accra, Ghana.

Ghana Red Cross Society is a volunteer based humanitarian body that helps the sick and needy individuals within communities. These include health care, social support, Disaster Risk Reduction and First Aid Services. In all these areas, mental health services and psychosocial support become very important.

== Mission ==
Ghana Red Cross seeks to prevent and alleviate human suffering by mobilizing the power of humanity.
