= List of road interchanges in Ghana =

This is a list of notable road interchanges in Ghana by region. The Ako Adjei Interchange was the first interchange to be constructed in Ghana. It was completed in 1999 by the Rawlings government. The Pokuase Interchange is the largest in Ghana. Other large interchanges include the Kwame Nkrumah and the Kasoa Interchange.

== Ashanti ==
- Asafo Interchange
- Asokwa Interchange
- Sofoline Interchange

== Central ==
- Kasoa Interchange

== Greater Accra ==
- Ako Adjei Interchange
- Apenkwa Interchange
- Dimples Interchange
- Flower Pot Interchange
- Kwame Nkrumah Interchange
- Mallam Interchange
- Pokuase Interchange - Upon completion, the Pokuase Interchange was the second four level stack interchange in Africa and the first in West Africa. It connects the Nsawam Road to the George Walker Bush Highway.
- Tema Motorway Interchange
- Tetteh Quarshie Interchange - The Tetteh Quarshie Interchange was the second Interchange to be built in Ghana after the Ako Adjei Interchange.

== Northern ==
- Tamale interchange - The Tamale Interchange was the first interchange to be constructed in the Northern Region and in Northern Ghana.
