= Asafo market =

Asafo Market
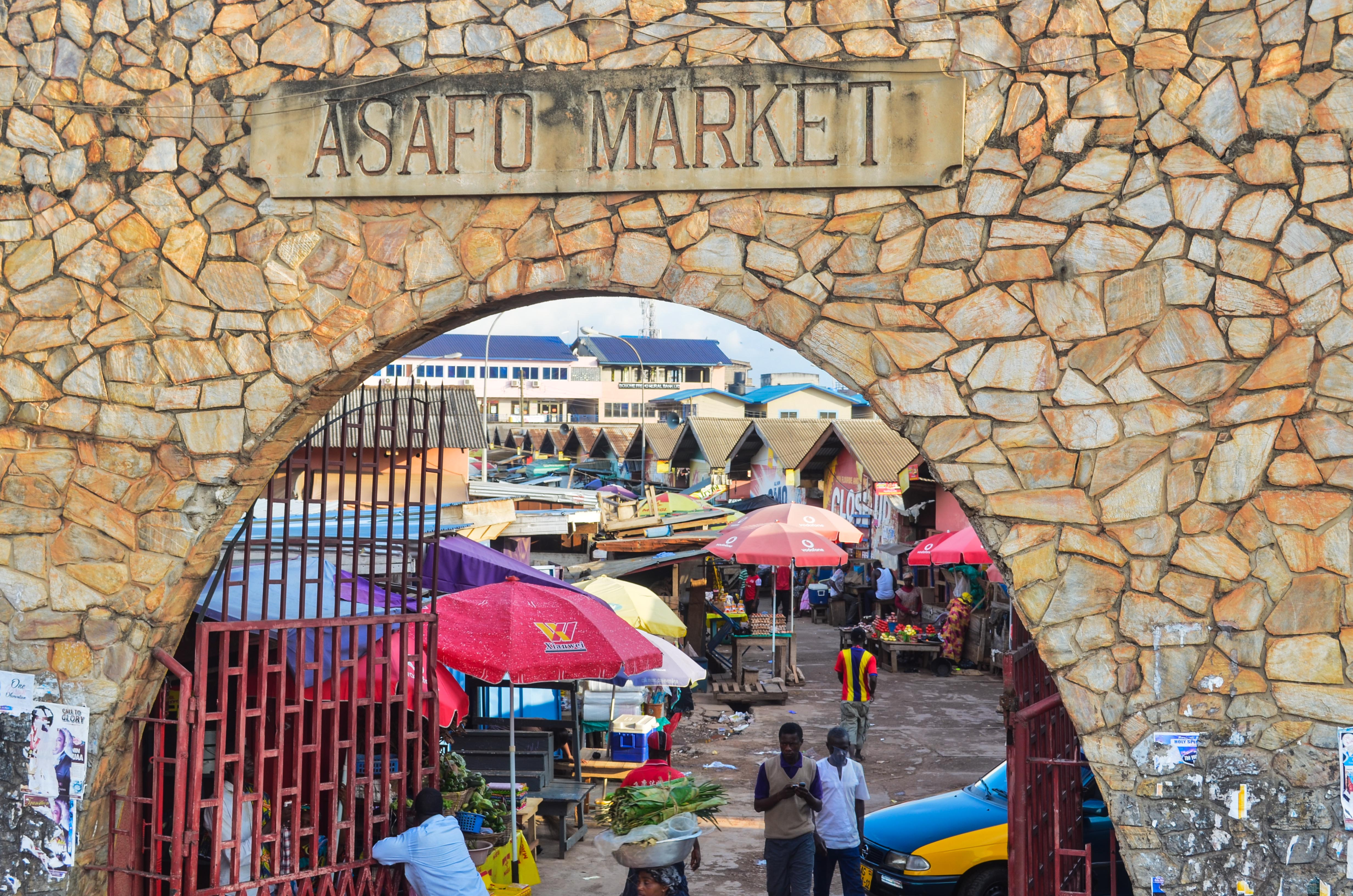
- Asafo Market entrance in September 2013.
- Location: Kumasi, Ashanti, Ghana
- Coordinates: 6.68806°N 1.61556°W

Asafo Market is a trading centre in Asafo, Kumasi, the capital of Ashanti, Ghana, to the western side of the Asafo interchange. Asafo Market was formerly called Nkrumah Market, which was named after the first Prime Minister of Ghana, Kwame Nkrumah; however, the name was changed to Asafo Market when Nkrumah was overthrown.
