= Mallen (disambiguation) =

Mallén is a municipality in the province of Zaragoza, Aragon, Spain

Mallen or the accented Mallén may also refer to:

== People ==
Given name

- Mallen Baker (born 1963), English expert on corporate social responsibility and a former politician

Surname

- Amalia Mallén, Cuban essayist, translator, suffragist, and feminist activist
- Charles Mallen (1819–1909), South Australian brewer
- George Mallen (born 1939), English computer arts businessman
- Jim Mallen (1881–1954), Canadian ice hockey player
- Ken Mallen (1884–1930), Canadian ice hockey player
- Mary Mallen, American actress and singer

== Fiction ==
- The Mallen novels by Catherine Cookson
  - The Mallen Streak (1973)
  - The Mallen Girl (1974)
  - The Mallen Litter (1974)
- The Mallens, a British television adaptation of the Catherine Cookson novels

== Sports ==
- CD Mallén, a Spanish football team based in Mallén

== See also ==
- Juan Montón y Mallén (c. 1730 – December 1781, in Segovia), Spanish composer and maestro de capilla of Segovia Cathedral
- Mallam (disambiguation)
