= Mallam =

Mallam may refer to:

== People ==
- Cliff Mallam (1909–2006), Australian politician from New South Wales
- Julia Mallam (born 1982), British actress
- Mujitaba Mohammed Mallam (born 1960), Nigerian educator and politician from Jigawa State
- Kaka Mallam Yale (born 1953), Nigerian farmer and politician from Borno State
- Mallam Yahaya (born 1974), Ghanaian footballer
- R. I. D. Mallam (1878–1954), judge in the Northern Territory of Australia

== Places ==
- Mallam (town), a residential town in the Greater Accra Region of Ghana
- Mallam Atta market, a major commercial market in Mallam town, Ghana
- Mallam Interchange, a dual carriage road system flyover in Accra, Ghana
- Garun Mallam, a Local Government Area in Kano State, Nigeria
- Mallam, Nellore District, a village in Andhra Pradesh, India

== Other uses ==
- Mallam, an African title
