= Kayayei =

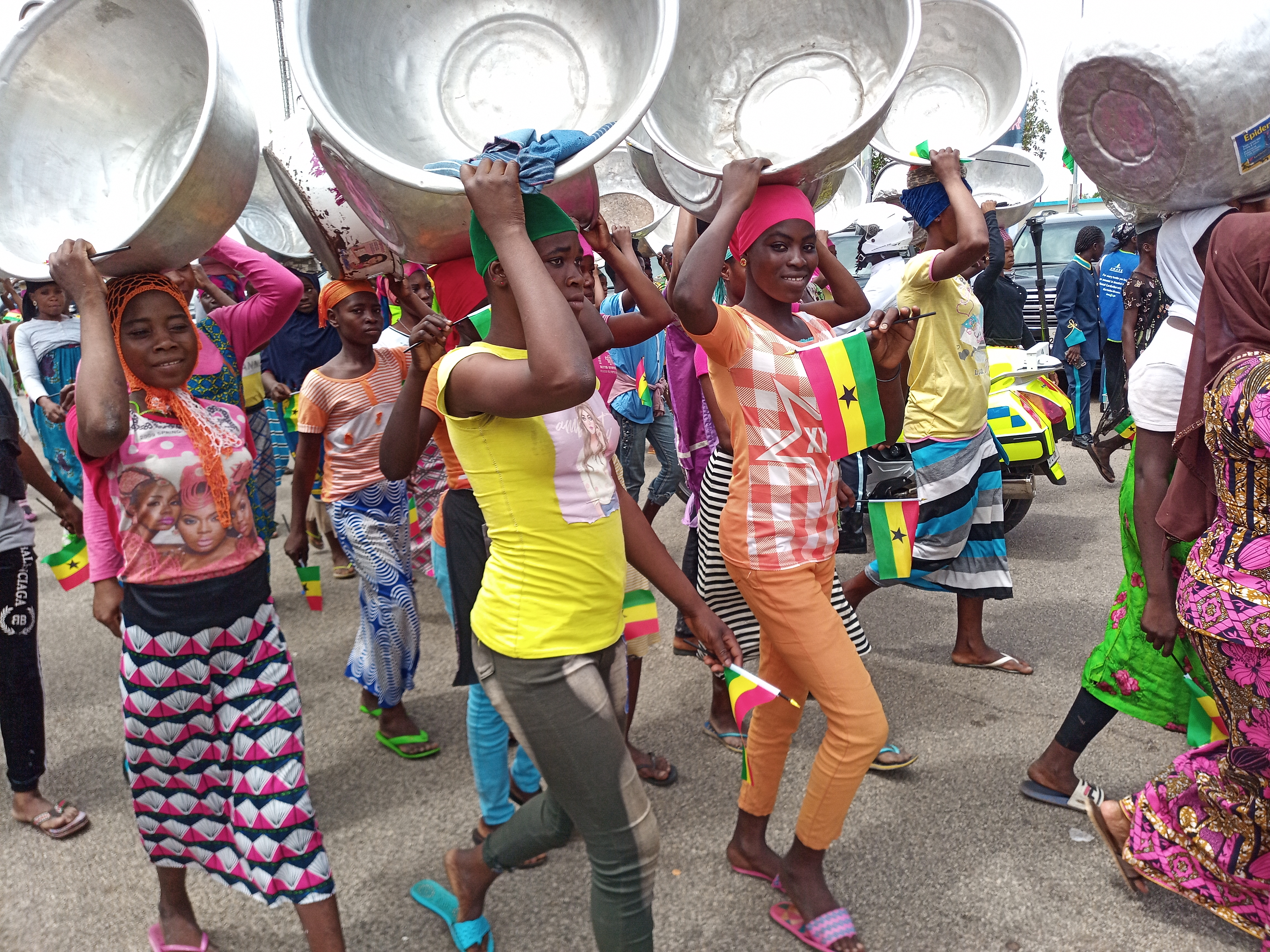
group of Kayayei women marching at Ghana's 2020 Independence Day Parade in Kumasi

Kayayei or Kaya Yei is a Ghanaian term for a female porter or bearer. Many of these women have migrated from a rural community to any of Ghana's urban cities in search of work. They generally carry their burdens on their heads.

== Etymology ==
The term kayayei (singular, kaya yoo) is a compound formed from two languages spoken in Ghana. Kaya means "load, luggage, goods or burden" in the Hausa language, and yei means "women or females" in the Ga language. People in Kumasi refer to the porters as paa o paa.

== Role ==
Kaya have always been manual labourers. They transport goods to and from markets, particularly agricultural goods. Typically, Kaya carry their loads in a large pan placed on their heads, using a moistened coil of cloth as a buffer, see Head-carrying.

== Conditions ==
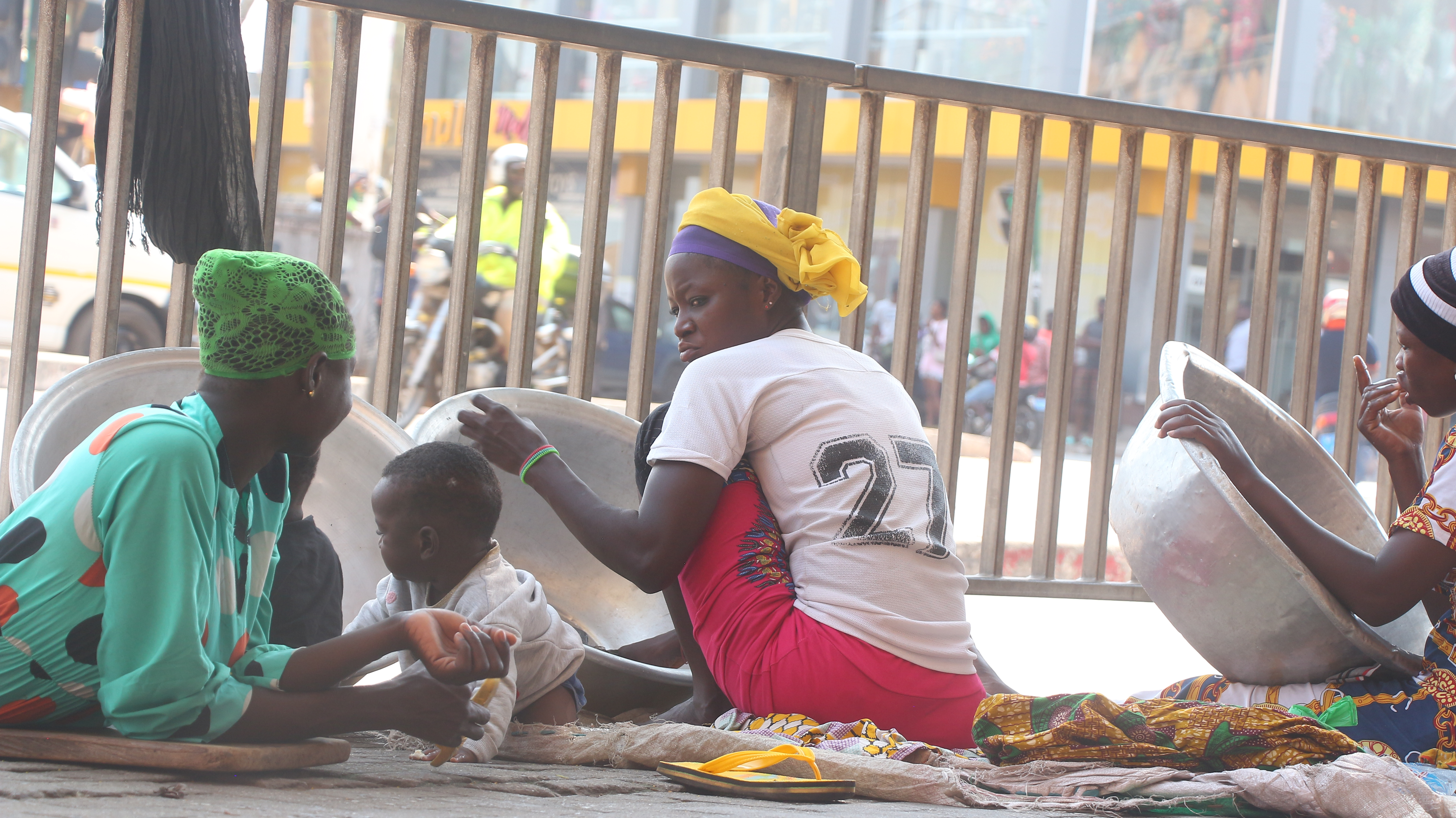
Ghanaian kayayei resting after work in Accra

Kaya Yei still toil away in markets in Ghana today, often in poor conditions and with minimal income. Occasionally, Kaya are brought into private homes to perform domestic tasks, where they may earn slightly more. The Kaya are often transient, and often without basic sanitation. Basic hygiene & nutrition conditions are also poor. In larger cities such as Accra & Kumasi, Kaya are often migrants from remote regions who have come to the cities in search for better employment prospects.

In May 2016, the Minister for Gender, Children and Social Protection Nana Oye Lithur ensured that over 1,000 kayayei from Agbogbloshie and Mallam Atta markets in Accra were registered onto the National Health Insurance Scheme, to help provide them access to basic healthcare service. In the 2017 annual budget, the Minister of Finance Ken Ofori-Atta exempted kayayei from paying market tolls to their various assemblies .
