= Apenkwa Interchange =

Road interchange in Ghana

The Apenkwa Interchange is a dual carriage road system flyover in Accra in the Greater Accra Region of Ghana. It is part of the six-lane, 14-kilometre (8.7 mi) George Walker Bush Highway constructed under the Millennium Challenge Account.
