= Pokuase Interchange =

- Interactive map of Pokuase Interchange

Location
- Pokuase, Ghana
- Coordinates: 5°41′6.11″N 0°16′44.7″W
- Roads at junction: Accra-Nsawam Road; Awoshie-Pokuase Road; Pokuase-Kwabenya-Ritz Junction Road

Construction
- Type: 4 tier interchange
- Constructed: 2018-2021
- Opened: 2021

The Pokuase Interchange is a four level stack interchange situated at Pokuase Junction, in Accra, Ghana. It is the largest interchange in West Africa upon its completion. The interchange was originally a three-tier as proposed by the John Dramani Mahama in 2016 but was modified on the advice of the constructor by the Akufo-Addo administration to a four-tier thereby making it the largest in West Africa. Construction began in 2018 and was commissioned for use on 9 July 2021 by president Nana Akuffo Addo. It lies on the Nsawam Road and connects the Nsawam Road to the George Walker Bush Highway.

== Financing ==
On 28th September 2016, the government of Ghana under the leadership of John Dramani Mahama signed a loan agreement with the African Development Bank to construct a three-tier interchange at Pokuase ACP Junction. The interchange's cost is estimated at 94.8 million dollars and funded by the African Development Bank and the Government of Ghana.

== Controversy ==
Although the funding was secured by the John Dramani Mahama government for a three-tier interchange, the project did not commence. In July 2018, the new government led by Nana Addo Dankwa Akufo-Addo redesigned it into a four-tier interchange. During the commissioning of the project the president, Nana Addo Dankwa Akufo-Addo, stated it was due to his hard work and effort that made it possible for the interchange to be constructed. The opposition National Democratic Congress did not take it lightly with several weeks of debate ensuing.
