= Revolution of the Ganhadores =

1857 strike in Salvador, Bahia, Brazil

- 1857 African porters' strike Part of Slavery in Brazil
- Date: 1–13 June 1857 (1 week and 5 days)
- Location: Salvador, Bahia, Empire of Brazil
- Caused by: Passage of a city ordinance that affected how porters operate in Salvador
- Goals: Repeal of the ordinance
- Result: Partial victory for the strikers; city ordinance repealed and replaced with new one

Parties
African porters	Government of Salvador, Bahia

The Revolution of the Ganhadores was a labor strike that involved African porters, known as ganhadores, in the Brazilian city of Salvador, Bahia. The strike began following the passage of a city ordinance that changed the way the ganhadores operated in the city. The strike ended in a partial victory for the strikers, as the city council replaced the ordinance with another one that did away with some of the more unpopular provisions.

During the 1800s, ganhadores were crucial to the transportation of goods through Salvador. The trade was dominated by both enslaved and free people of African descent who worked together in self-governing groups known as cantos. While the ganhadores were given a great deal of freedom to move through the city, fears of a slave revolt, in the vein of the Malê revolt of 1835, prompted the government to try to exert more control over the ganhadores. In 1836, the provincial government of Bahia enacted a law that required ganhadores to register with the government, wear identification tags, and operate under the direct supervision of captains, which replaced the canto system. The law proved extremely unpopular, not just with the ganhadores, but with the general public as well, and by the following year, the canto system was restored, and the law became unenforced. In 1857, the city council of Salvador enacted a new law modeled after the 1836 act which again required ganhadores to register and wear metal identification tags around their necks. Ganhadores were required to pay a fee for the tags, while freedmen also had to provide a guarantor who would take responsibility for the ganhador. To protest the new law, ganhadores in the city went on strike on 1 June, the same date that the law went into effect.

The strike effectively shut down transportation inside the city. Local newspapers reported on the strike with front-page stories and noted the impact that the action was having on the local economy. Within days, the president of the province, João Lins Cansanção, Viscount of Sinimbu, ordered the city council to rescind the fee requirement from the law. However, the strike continued, and within a week, the city council announced that they were repealing the law, replacing it with a new one. This new law still required ganhadores to register and wear identification tags around their necks, but it removed the registration fee and changed the rules regarding freedmen so that they no longer had to have a guarantor, but instead just a "certificate of guarantee" from an authority or a respectable citizen. With these changes, the strike continued, but more ganhadores registered and returned to work, and by 13 June, the Jornal da Bahia newspaper reported that the strike had effectively ended.

According to Brazilian historian João José Reis, the strike was the first general strike in Brazil's history. He attributes the partial success of the strike to the solidarity among Salvador's Afro-Brazilian community and sees the event as an early example of pan-Africanism that would become more common throughout Bahia in the late 1800s.

== Background ==
=== Urban slavery in Salvador ===
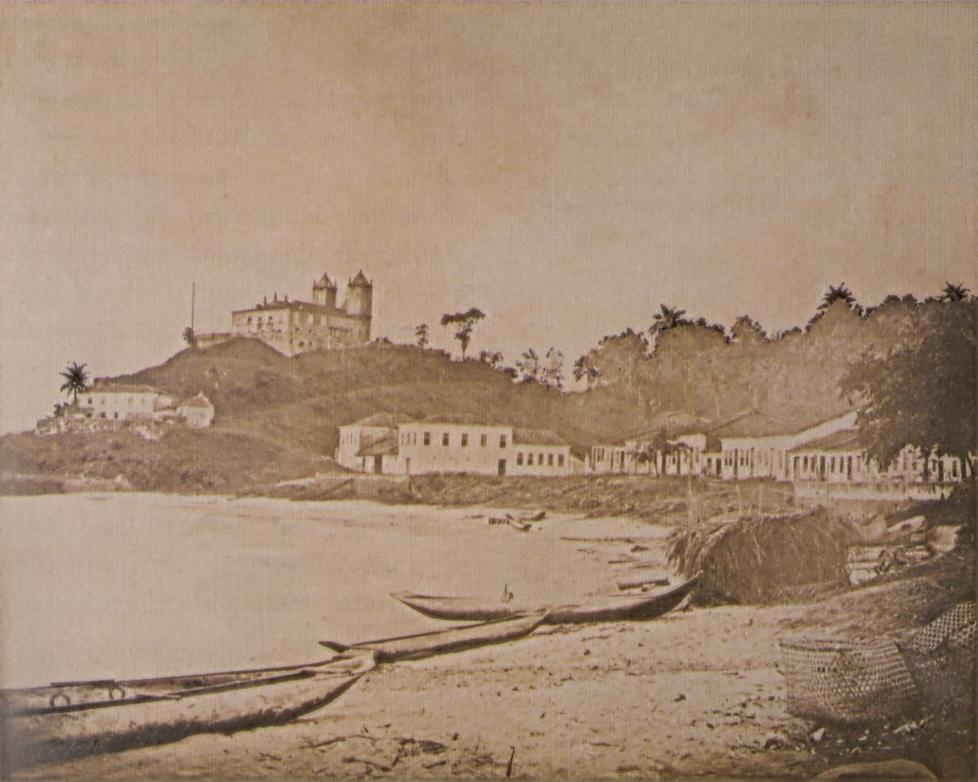
Salvador in 1858

In 1857, Salvador, the capital city of the Brazilian province of Bahia and a major port in the Atlantic slave trade, had a population of over 50,000. (Note: Estimates vary widely for the 1857 population of Salvador. Brazilian historians Ana Amélia Nascimento and Kátia de Queirós Mattoso estimated that the city had a population of 58,498 and 89,260, respectively. The Jornal da Bahia newspaper gave a contemporary estimate of between 140,000 and 150,000, though historian João José Reis states that this may be an exaggerated estimate.) White Brazilians made up about 30 percent of the population, while black people constituted about 40 percent of the population. Altogether, Afro-Brazilians, which included slaves, freedmen, and mixed-race people of African descent, made up a majority of the city's population. Slaves made up between 30 and 40 percent of the population, with a majority of them having been born in Africa. Many were Nagos, or members of the Yoruba people from the area around the Bight of Benin. The system of urban slavery in Salvador differed in some ways from plantation slavery. Many of the slaves in Salvador were allowed a comparatively high freedom of movement and engaged in various forms of manual street labor, in trades such as bricklaying or carpentry. It was not uncommon for masters to let their slaves rent residences away from their homes and return only once per week to give their masters a part of the money that they had earned through their labor, with the slaves allowed to keep the remainder. In many cases, these slaves worked alongside freedmen, and some slaves were able to save enough money to eventually purchase their manumission.

=== Ganhadores ===
Many black people in Salvador worked as laborers known as ganhadores ('earners'). These ganhadores worked as porters, transporting goods, cargo, and people throughout the city. Transportation in the city was largely dependent on these ganhadores, as other forms of transportation were either unavailable or economically unfeasible for most merchants. At the time, it was a profession held entirely by black people, with no white people or pardo Brazilians (people of mixed race or ethnicity) working in that field. During an 1847 visit to Salvador, Alexandre, Baron Forth-Rouen des Mallets of France, wrote that black people constituted "the majority of the Bahia's population" and were "the only ones to be seen in the streets, like beasts employed to carry all kinds of burdens, and which circulate laden with heavy loads". A similar observation was made by German explorer Robert Christian Avé-Lallemant during an 1858 stay in Salvador, where he said, "Everything that runs, shouts, works, everything that transports and carries is black". About 30 percent of the Nagos slaves in Salvador worked exclusively as ganhadores, and a majority worked either full-time or part-time as such. The ganhadores of Salvador organized themselves into work groups known as cantos, (Note: The word canto in this context has a double meaning, as it can be translated as either 'corner' or 'song'. The translation as corner refers to streetcorners, where many ganhadores would gather for work. The translation as song refers to the work songs that the ganhadores often sang.) with each canto covering a particular area of the city. These cantos also functioned as important public spaces for Africans in Salvador, as they served as gathering places where people could interact, buy and sell goods, and engage in religious practices. Each canto was led by an individual known as the capitão-do-canto ('captain of the canto'), who was selected from among the ganhadores of the canto and could be either freedmen or slaves.

=== Malê revolt and its aftermath ===
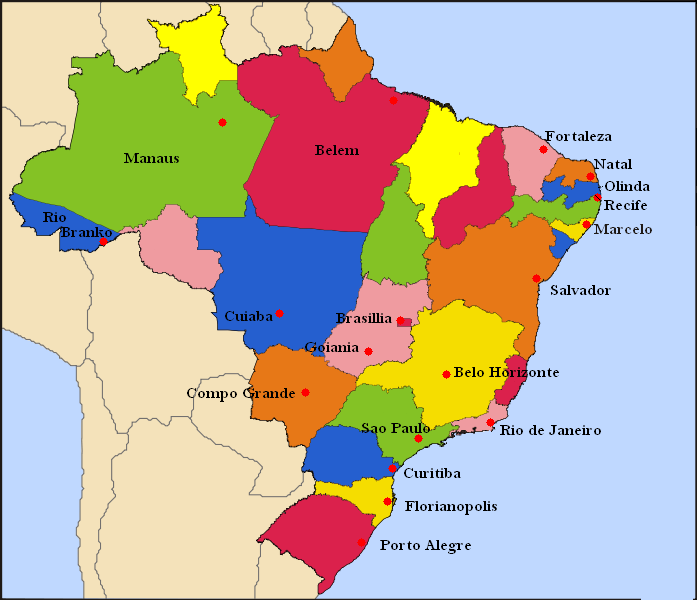
Modern map of Brazil showing the locations of Rio de Janeiro, Salvador, and São Paulo.

Between 1807 and 1835, slaves in Bahia staged over 20 slave rebellions that scared many slave owners in the region. In 1835, a group of Muslim slaves and freedmen in Salvador, a majority of whom were Yoruba, revolted in what historian João José Reis called "the most dramatic urban slave rebellion in Brazilian history". The uprising was ultimately suppressed, and in the aftermath, about half of the prisoners who were indicted for involvement were ganhadores. Additionally, 17 percent of the individuals were artisans who probably worked in the cantos and had acted as the main conspirators in the uprising. In June of that year, in response to the uprising, the Provincial Legislature enacted Law 14, which replaced the cantos with capatazias. Under this system, the capatazias would be overseen by a capataz ('foreman') who would receive a salary directly from the ganhadores he oversaw and, according to the law, would "police the ganhadores". Additionally, ganhadores would be required to register themselves with the government and wear metal bracelets with identification tags. The ganhadores were required to register monthly and would face a fee of 10,000 réis for failure to do so. A system of inspectors was established to oversee their registrations, police the areas to which they were assigned, and to serve as the capatazes' superiors. The law, which took effect in April 1836, was unpopular among the ganhadores and the wider public. An article published in the Diário da Bahia in May 1836 criticized the capatazes and the identification tags, arguing that they would lead to increased prices and would hinder the movement of the ganhadores around the city. Additionally, the newspaper felt that the province should not become involved in laws regarding ganhadores, which they felt was a matter best left to the city government. Authorities had difficulties in enforcing the law, as many ganhadores refused to register, gave false information, refused to pay fines, and relocated to parts of the city where the law was not strongly enforced. Businesspeople and merchants in some areas complained about the effect that the law had on their businesses, with the number of active ganhadores in these areas dropping considerably. Ultimately, by 1837, authorities gave in, cantos were restored, and the law went unenforced.

=== 1857 city ordinance ===
Despite the failure of Law 14, Brazilian authorities continued to try to exert control over the ganhadores over the decades that followed. Around March 1857, (Note: A 1997 article by João José Reis in the Journal of Latin American Studies does not give an exact date, but states that it had occurred "three months" before 1 June 1857.) the city government of Salvador promulgated an ordinance that stated that ganhadores would have to register for a permit with the city council in order to continue to work in that profession. The total cost of registration was 5,000 réis, roughly the price of 10 kilograms (22 lb) of meat, with 3,000 réis going towards a metal plaque with the slave's registration number engraved on it. This plaque was to be worn around their necks at all times while working. A similar policy had existed since the early 1840s regarding the ganhadores in Rio de Janeiro, the capital of the Brazilian Empire. Additionally, ganhadores who were freedmen needed to present guarantors who would take responsibility for their behavior. A similar city ordinance that was already in place at the time applied to ganhadeiras, black women who worked in the streets as grocery vendors, who had to pay an annual fee of 20,000 réis. The ordinance would come into effect on 1 June.

== Course of the strike ==
The blacks have hidden themselves; and if the masters do not intervene, ordering them to obey the Law, this calamity will continue because, according to what we have heard, they are so disposed.

— Coverage of the strike in the Jornal da Bahia, 2 June 1857

The strike action began on 1 June, the day that the act became enforceable. Transportation in the city was immediately paralyzed. The following day, the Jornal da Bahia published a front-page story on the strike, saying that there were no active ganhadores in the city and that nothing had left the customs house except for some small items and goods that were carried by slaves of the parties involved. The newspaper continued to publish front-page updates for the duration of the strike. On 1 June, the Commercial Association, a group that represented some of the largest merchants in the city, protested the ordinance to Bahia's provincial president, João Lins Cansanção, Viscount of Sinimbu. Cansanção, an economically liberal politician, immediately ordered the council to stop charging a registration fee and distribute the tags free of charge. This resulted in a schism between the president and the city council, with the president arguing that the council did not have the authority to levy the tax against the ganhadores without the consent of the provincial government and that the burden of the fee would be passed on to consumers. Despite objections from some of the aldermen, the council agreed to waive the registration fee. At the onset of the strike, there was confusion amongst different groups regarding what had been its main cause. The Commercial Association argued that the registration tax was the main item to blame, while the editors of the Jornal stated that the mandatory identification tags were responsible, while the ganhadores viewed them as an obvious sign of humiliation and dehumanization. The city council, meanwhile, stated that the strike had begun because the ganhadores "wish to dispense with any type of supervision".

With the financial portion of the ordinance repealed, the ganhadores continued to strike over the regulations found in the law, specifically the provision that they needed to wear metal identification tags. On 2 June, the Jornal reported that there had been some movement of goods from the customs house, but that overall transportation was near-nonexistent. By the third day, however, some slaves began to defect and return to work. Many had had their tags acquired for them by their owners and faced retribution from their owners for continuing to strike. According to archives kept by the city council, there were 40 registrations made on 4 June, after owners were made aware that they would not have to pay the fee, compared to just three registrations that had been made prior to that date. The Jornal reported that some slaves who wore their tags in public were attacked with stones by strikers, and others chose to take off their tags and resume striking after pressure from other Africans. Despite these incidents, solidarity remained relatively strong among the strikers and the supporting community, with evidence that some ganhadeiras allowed the strikers to purchase food on credit. On 5 June, the Jornal called the strike a "dangerous crisis, a revolution" led by "new revolutionaries", labeling it the "revolution of ganhadores". Many white Brazilians in the city were alarmed at the impact that the strike was having and were fearful of an all-out slave rebellion.

On 8 June, some ganhadores began to return to work without wearing their identification tags. This number continued to increase in the days that followed. On 9 June, the city council voted to repeal the ordinance and replaced it with a new one that did away entirely with the tax. Additionally, freedmen were no longer required to have guarantors, but instead only had to have a "certificate of guarantee" from an official or reputable citizen. However, the new law still required all ganhadores to wear their tags in public. Following this new law, many freedmen began to collect certificates of guarantee and register with the city government, and by 12 June, many ganhadores had returned to work, wearing their tags. However, a significant number returned to work without tags, either as a form of continued protest or because the city government had run out of tags. The following day, the Jornal reported that commerce was resuming to pre-strike levels, with the strike effectively over.

== Aftermath ==
The strike had a large short-term impact on Salvador's economy and history, as it had effectively shut down transportation within the city for a week. In 1997, Reis called the event the first general strike in Brazil's history, occurring several years prior to a more well-known strike involving printers in Rio de Janeiro in 1858. Ultimately, the strike was partially successful in opposing the city ordinance. While ganhadores were still required to register and wear tags, they were not required to pay for them, and freedmen found it much easier to attain a "certificate of guarantee" than to find a guarantor. According to Reis, the partial success of the strike can be attributed in large part to the organized nature of the cantos, which allowed for a form of organized labor amongst the ganhadores. Additionally, the strong ethnic ties among the Nagos helped to foster solidarity among the strikers and the larger Afro-Brazilian community in Salvador, with Reis stating that the strike represented an early form of pan-Africanism that became more widespread through Bahia in the later 1800s. Reis also states that the shortcomings of the strike may be attributed to the large number of slaves who worked alongside freedmen as ganhadores and were more likely to defect, ultimately serving as unintentional strikebreakers. In 1880, new legislation removed the requirement for the ganhadores to wear metal tags, though it still required them to wear registration identification on the right sleeves of their shirts. Additionally, the new legislation required them to register with the police and not directly with the city council. Over the next several decades, the percentage of slaves working as ganhadores declined, and by 1888, the year that slavery was abolished in Brazil, slaves constituted only about 2.5 percent of Salvador's population.

== Sources ==
- Graden, Dale T. (2005). "African Responses to the End of the International Slave Trade and Abolitionist Initiatives in Bahia, Brazil, 1850–1865". In Curto, José C.; Soulodre-La France, Renée (eds.). Africa and the Americas: Interconnections During the Slave Trade. Translated by Gledhill, H. Sabrina. Trenton, New Jersey: Africa World Press. pp. 127–140. ISBN 978-1-59221-271-2.
- Reis, João José (May 1997). "'The Revolution of the Ganhadores': Urban Labour, Ethnicity and the African Strike of 1857 in Bahia, Brazil". Journal of Latin American Studies. 29 (2). Translated by H. Sabrina Gledhill. Cambridge University Press: 355–393. doi:10.1017/S0022216X9700477X. JSTOR 158398. S2CID 55955013.
- Reis, João José (2005). "Street Labor in Bahia on the Eve of the Abolition of Slavery". In Curto, José C.; Soulodre-La France, Renée (eds.). Africa and the Americas: Interconnections During the Slave Trade. Translated by Gledhill, H. Sabrina. Trenton, New Jersey: Africa World Press. pp. 141–172. ISBN 978-1-59221-271-2.
