= Sofoline Interchange =

Road junction in Kumasi, Ghana

- Interactive map of Sofoline Interchange

Location
- Kumasi, Ghana
- Coordinates: 6°42′00″N 1°38′43″W

Construction
- Constructed: 2007

The Sofoline Interchange is a transportation hub and a major landmark under construction in Kumasi, Ghana. Construction began in 2007, and was expected to be completed by 2010, but was halted due to a lack of funds.

== History ==
The Sofoline Interchange began construction in 2007 by China Geo-Engineering Corporation (CGC) as part of an effort to ease bottleneck traffic congestion. The project also included the construction of an interchange at Komfo Anokye Teaching Hospital and the reconstruction of an 11 kilometres (6.8 mi) dual carriageway, and was funded by the government of Ghana. The project was due for completion in 2010, but construction was halted due to a lack of funds. Construction resumed in 2018, following a settlement of GH₵30 million in arrears to CGC, which was paid by the Ministry of Roads and Highways. As of January 2022, the Interchange is 75 percent complete.

=== Illegal occupants ===
There have been two instances of illegal occupants having been stationed near the Sofoline Interchange; the first was in late 2021 and early 2022, where car dealers were given until 31 December 2021 to vacate the interchange, but this ultimatum was extended to 20 January 2022, after which vehicles would be removed at the cost of the owners, according to a statement by the Ashanti Regional Coordinating Council. In April 2024, the Regional Security Council (REGSEC) gave traders at the Kwadaso Onion Market, which was stationed near the Interchange, three weeks to relocate to Atwima Takyiman.

=== Sanitation and safety concerns ===
In September 2018, parts of the Sofoline Interchange started to fall apart following heavy rain, including a 10-meter long concrete wall connecting several roads to the Ashanti Region. In 2025, sanitation concerns among residents and commuters using the interchange rose, as its underpass was being misused as a public dumping ground. Additionally, the underpass area is prone to flooding, making commuting dangerous.
