= Tamale Interchange =

General information
- Inaugurated: 10th April 2019
- Owner: State

The Tamale Interchange is a road interchange project within the Tamale Metropolis of the Northern Region of Ghana. The first of its kind in the northern sector of the country.

Its construction was initiated on April 10, 2019 when the president of the Republic of Ghana, Nana Addo Dankwa Akuffo Addo, launched and also cut the sod for its construction to begin. The interchange is aimed at enhancing inter-urban and national traffic flow and reducing the huge burden and cost of doing business, and also strengthening trade within the Sub Saharan regions.

== Structure ==
The structure is a pre-stressed concrete bridge spanning a distance of some 1.1 kilometers. The Interchange was a continuous concrete bridge with a total length of 1072 meters including the ramp. This set it apart from other simply supported bridges of the past, which had several expansion joints and made driving less comfortable for drivers

== Funding ==
This project was funded under the US$2 billion China Syno-hydro deal. The Government of Ghana signed a Master Project Support Agreement (MPSA) for the delivery worth of priority infrastructure projects across the country, in exchange for the delivery of Ghanaian manufactured aluminium products to Sinohydro.

== Controversies ==
The opposition National Democratic Congress's Hannah Louisa Bissiw, National Women's Organizer, has noted that Tamale residents do not require an interchange, despite the fact that heavy traffic is clogging the city. The former lawmaker feels that since the Tamale interchange is not a pressing requirement for the public, it is unnecessary to continue building it as part of the Synohydro agreement. She claimed that people are inconvenienced by excessive vehicular traffic in the city center caused by road obstructions with aluminum zincs

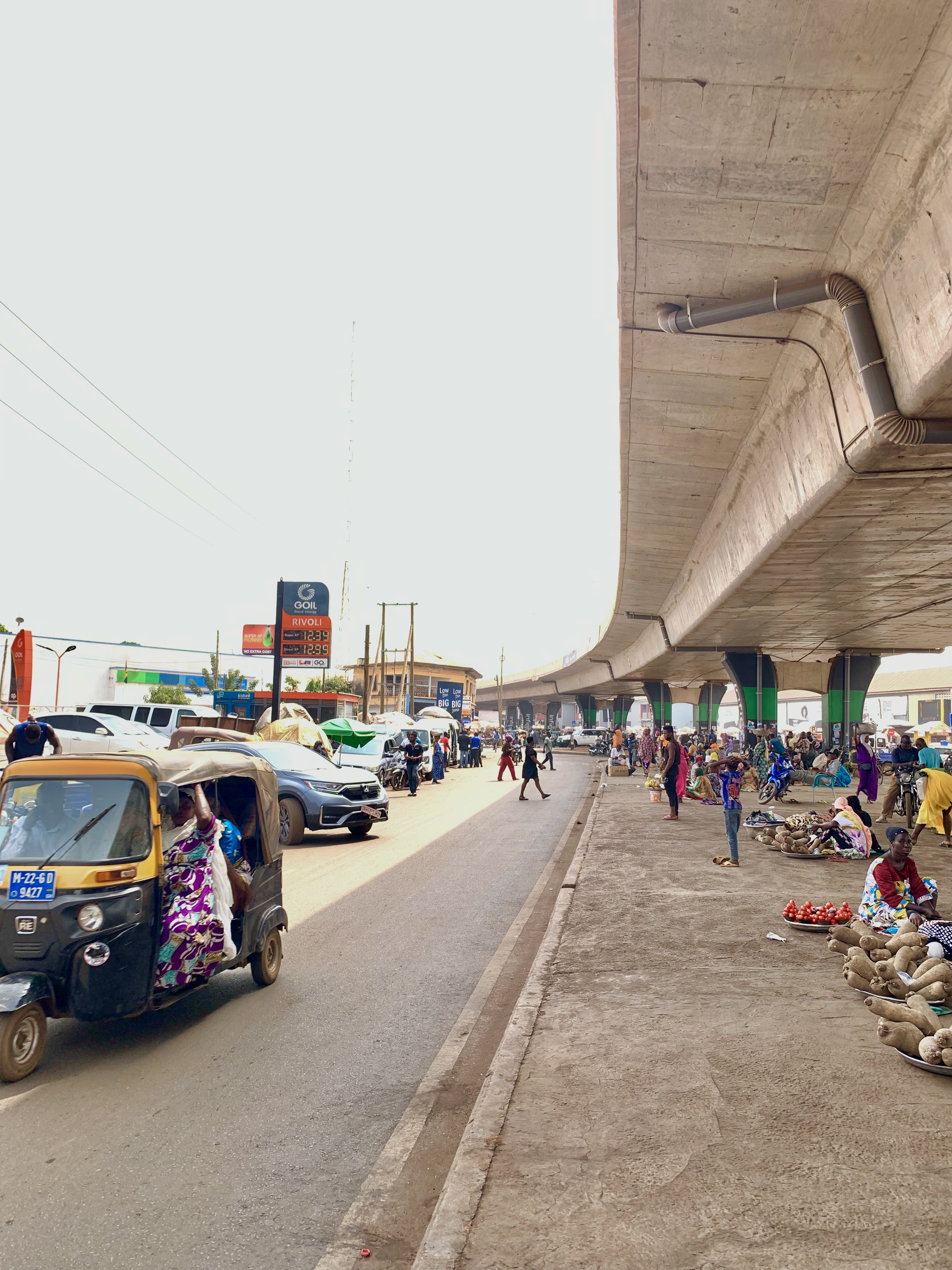
Tamale Interchange
