= Tema Motorway Interchange =

Tetteh Quarshie Interchange
- Interactive map of Tetteh Quarshie Interchange

Location
- Tema, Ghana
- Coordinates: 5°41′8.06″N 0°0′52.61″W
- Roads at junction: Tema Motorway; Harbour Road; Aflao Road

Construction
- Type: Stack interchange
- Constructed: 2018
- Opened: 1 June 2020

The Tema Motorway Interchange is a stack interchange, which replaced the Tema Roundabout, situated east of the Tema Motorway. It carries four-lane trunk roads that connects Tema Motorway, Aflao Road, Akosombo Road, and Tema Harbour Road.

== Financing ==
The interchange cost 60 million dollars and was funded by the Japan International Cooperation Agency.
