= Head-carrying =

Method for humans to carry a burden

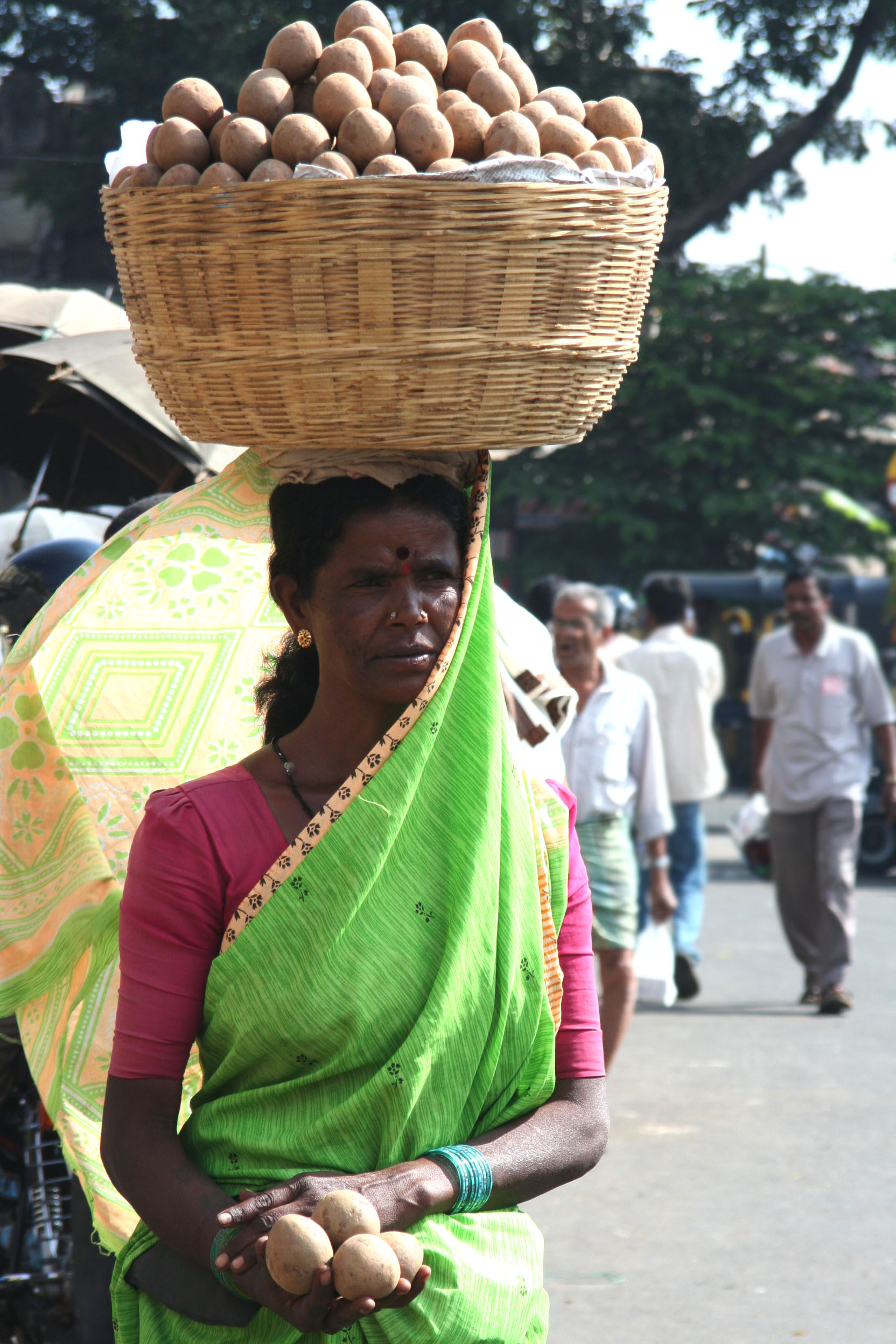
Sari-clad woman in Mysore, India, balancing a basket of chikoo on her head.

Carrying on the head is a common practice in many parts of the world as an alternative to carrying a burden on the back, shoulders and so on. People have carried burdens balanced on top of the head since ancient times, usually to do daily work, but sometimes in religious ceremonies or as a feat of skill, such as in certain dances.

== Working ==
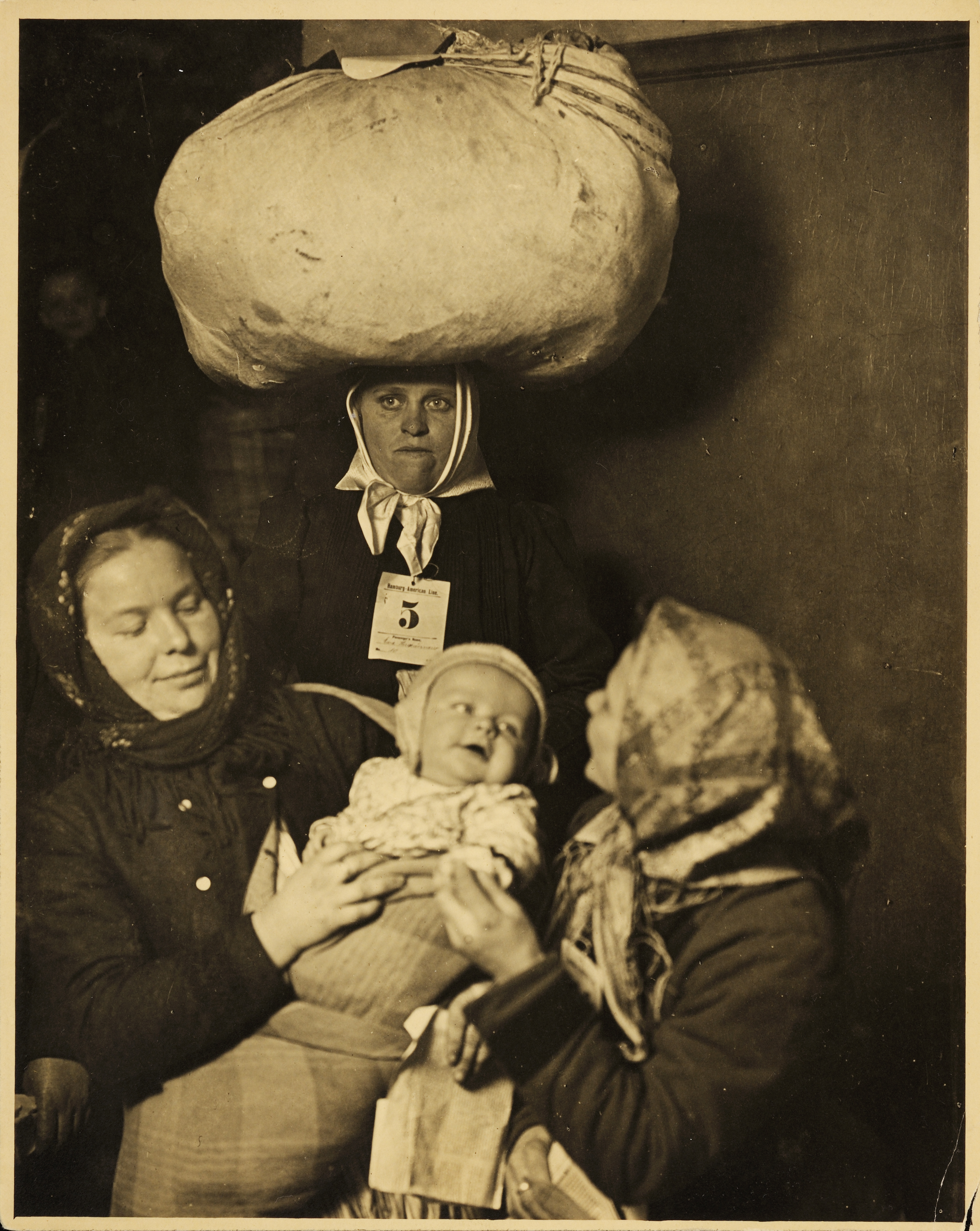
Slovak immigrants on Ellis Island, 1905, among which a woman head-carrying.

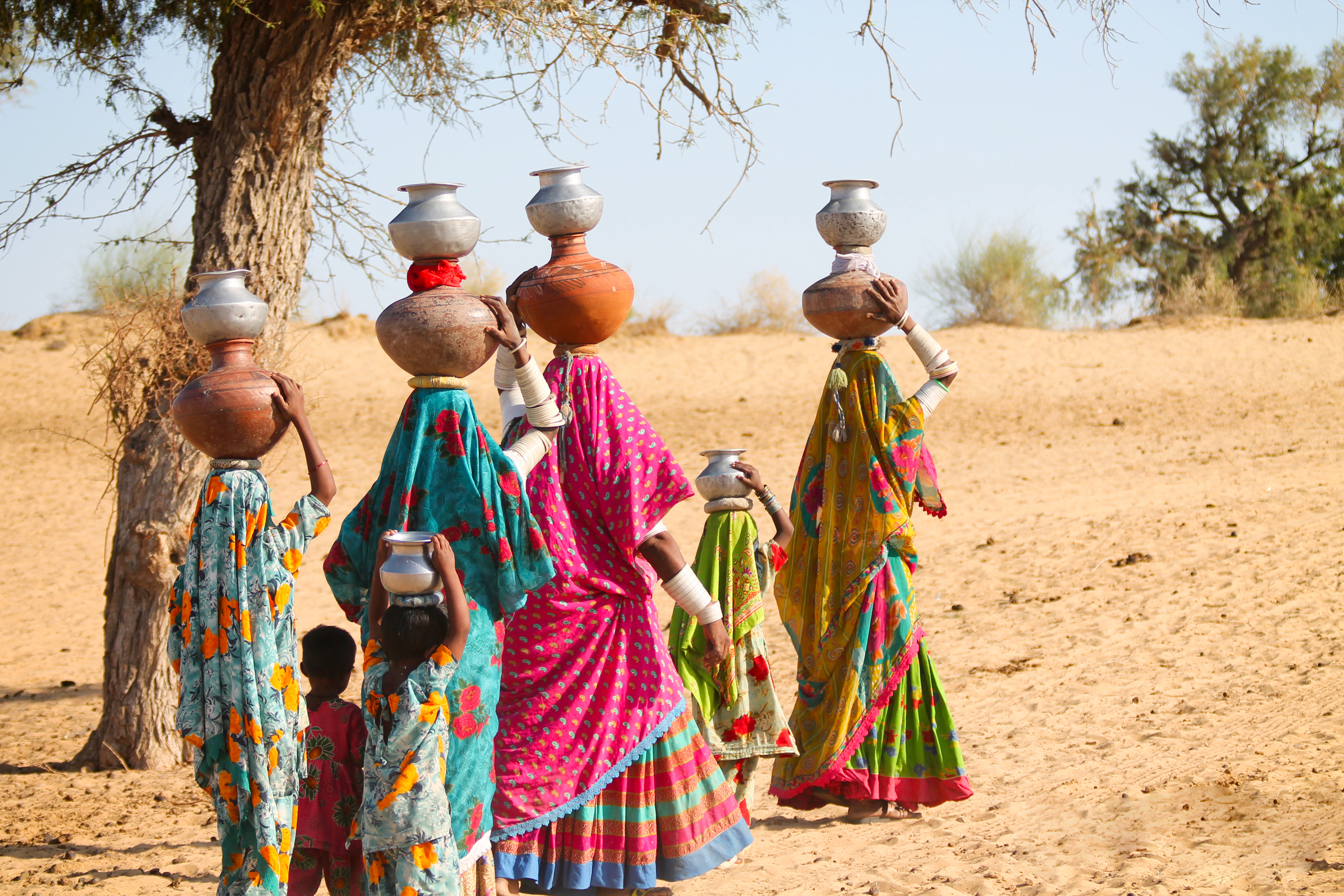
Women and children carrying pots filled with water in Thar desert. The adults carry double-stacked loads.

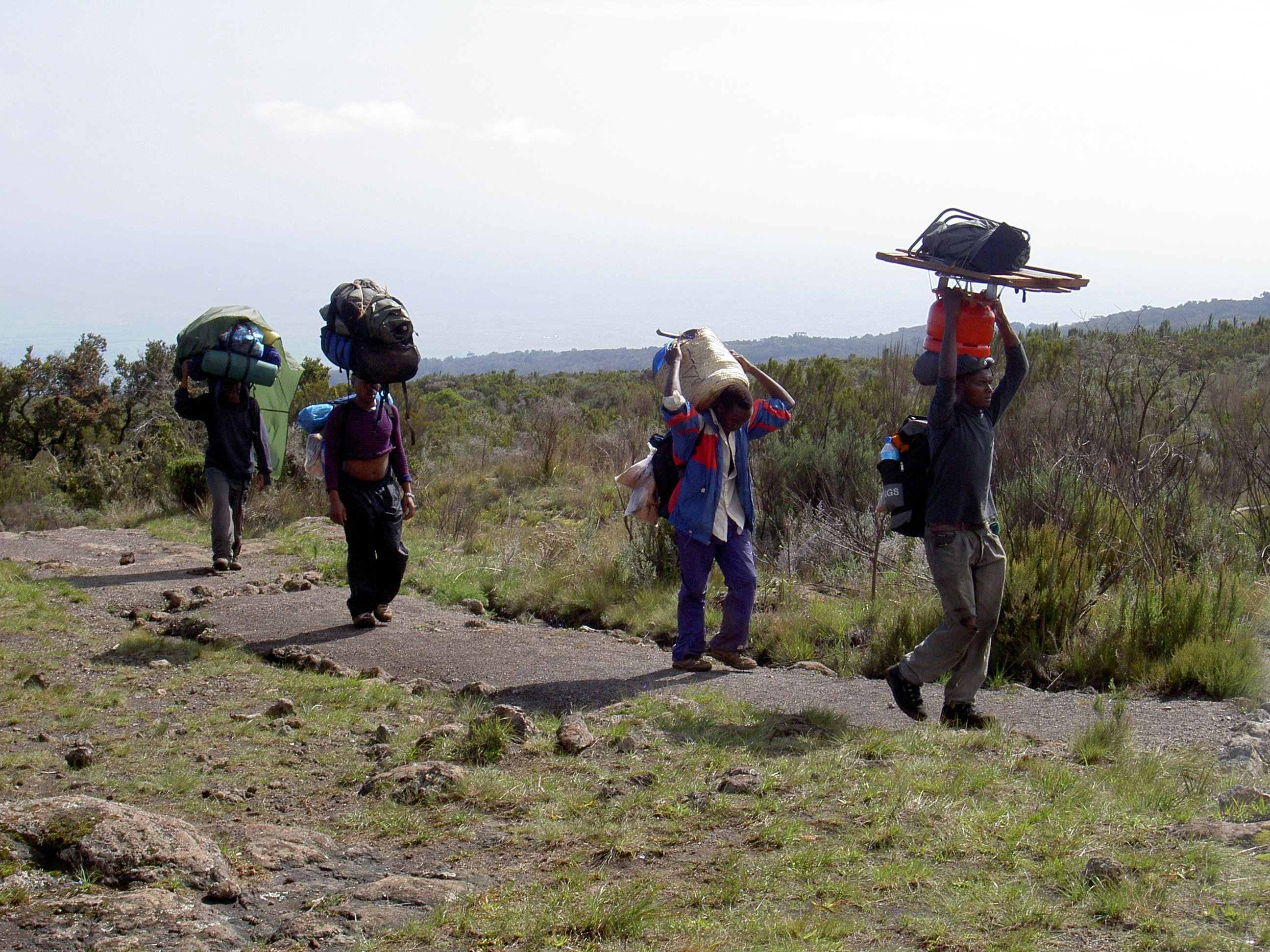
Porters for an expedition climbing Mount Kilimanjaro, Tanzania, carrying large loads on their heads along a wide path.

Carrying on the head is common in many parts of the developing world, as only a simple length of cloth shaped into a ring or ball is needed to carry loads approaching the person's own weight. The practice is efficient, in a place or at a time when there are no vehicles or beasts of burden available for transporting the objects. Today, women and men carry burdens on their heads where there is no cheaper, or more efficient, way of transporting workloads. In India, women carry baskets of bricks to workmen on construction sites. It is also used by the lowest caste to carry away human waste scooped out of pit latrines, the practice of manual scavenging.

It is also wide-spread in Africa. Women in particular may have practical reasons for carrying on the head. For many African women it is "well-suited to the rough, rural terrain and the particular objects they carry—like buckets of water and bundles of firewood". The practice is usually not abandoned after migrating to urban areas where their daily routines, and socially accepted practices, are different. In Ghana, affluent residents of the southern cities employ young women who migrate from the poorer northern region to work as "head porters", called kayayei, for $2 a day. In East Africa, Luo women may carry loads of up to 70% of their own body weight balanced on top of their heads. Women of the Kikuyu tribe carry similar heavy loads, but using a leather strap wrapped around their forehead and the load to secure it while it is carried. This results in a permanent groove in the forehead of the women. Researchers speculate that training from a young age may explain this. Up to 20% of the person's body weight can be carried with no extra exertion of energy. Other researchers have shown that African and European women carrying 70% of their body weight in controlled studies used more oxygen while head-carrying, in contrast to carrying a load on their backs. The research did not support the notion that head-loading is less exerting than carrying on the back, "although there is some evidence of energy saving mechanisms for back-loading at low speed/load combinations".

African-American women continued the practice during the 19th century, which they learned from their elders who had been enslaved from Africa. One observer during the American Civil War noted the impressive sense of balance and dexterity that the practice gave women in South Carolina: "I have seen a woman, with a brimming water-pail balanced on her head, or perhaps a cup, saucer, and spoon, stop suddenly, turn round, stoop to pick up a missile, rise again, fling it, light a pipe, and go through many revolutions with either hand or both, without spilling a drop". Until the turn of the 20th century, African-American women in the Southern states continued carrying baskets and bundles of folded clothes on top of their heads, when they found work as washerwomen, doing laundry for white employers. This practice ended when the automobile became common in affluent communities, and employers began delivering the clothing to the homes of the washerwomen, rather than the workers coming to the employers' homes.

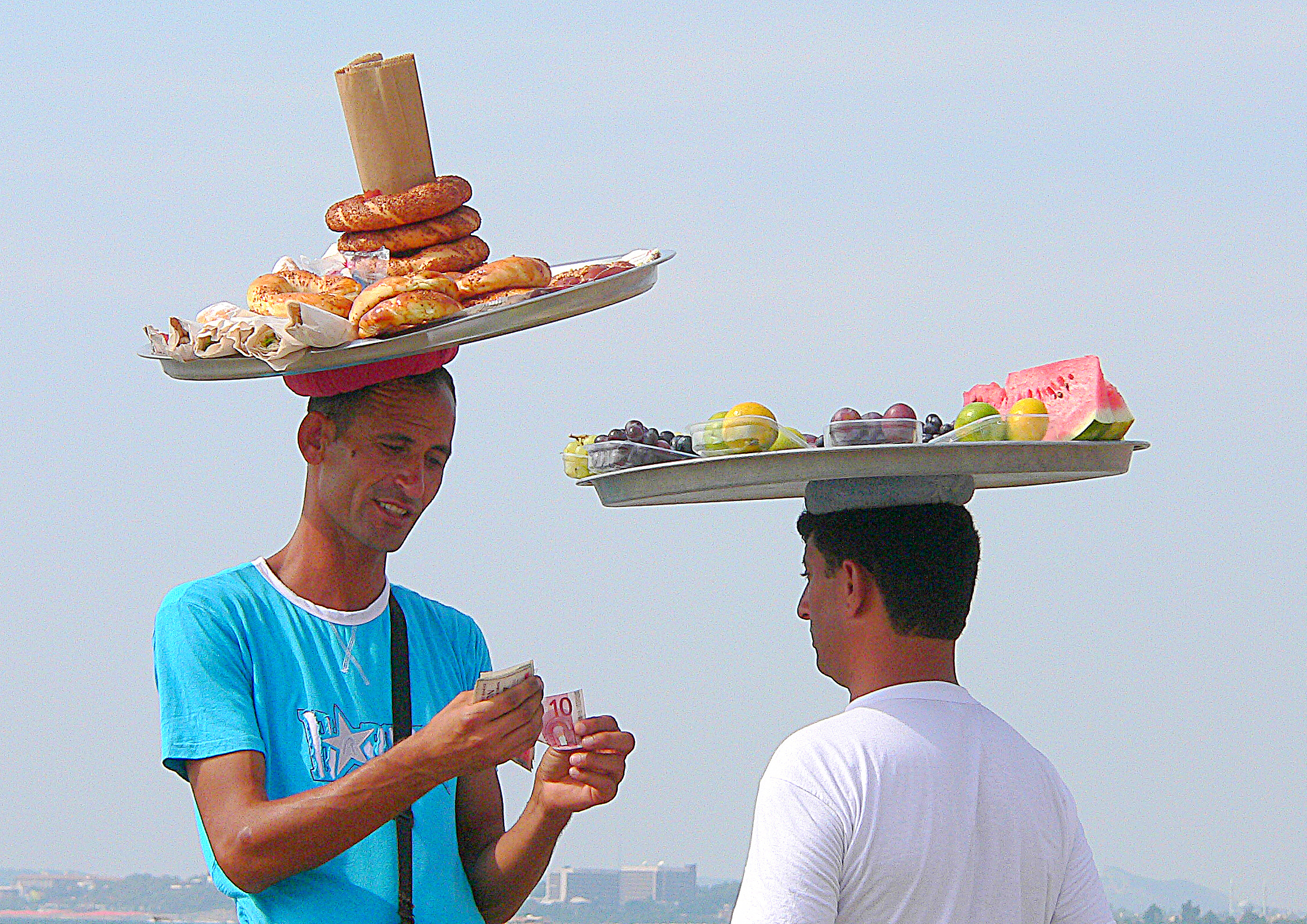
Two peddlers in Side, Turkey.

Head-carrying was used in London's Covent Garden market in the late 19th century, with porters competing to carry up to 15 stacked baskets on their head. In describing "the most cosmopolitan fruit market in the world" just before the Great Depression in the late 1920s, the United States department of Agriculture said the porters carried produce on their heads, backs, or in barrows. Every day loads continued to be transported on the head into the 1950s, as shown in the documentary film Every Day Except Christmas.

== Dance ==
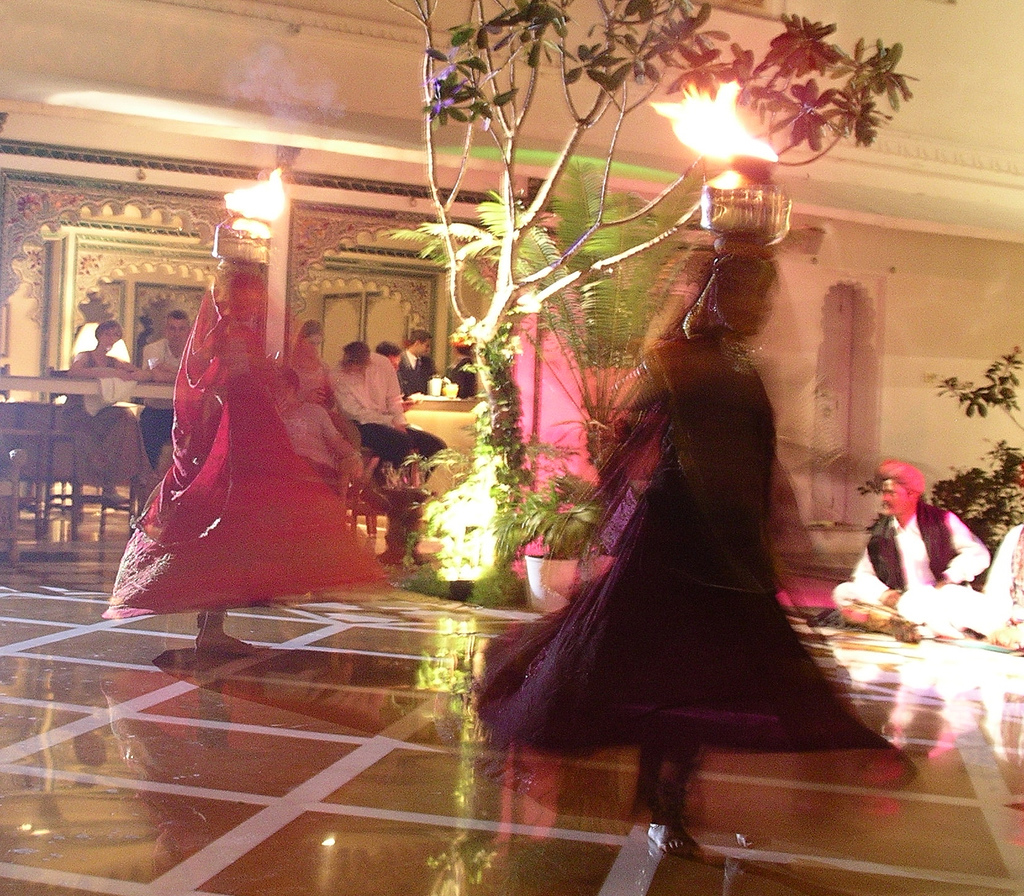
Spinning dancers balance flaming bowls on their heads, Udaipur, India.

There are several traditional dances of West African cultures that include balancing an object on the head as a skillful feat. Ritual dancing among worshippers of the thunder deity, Shango, sometimes balance a container of fire on their heads while dancing. The Egbado Yoruba have dances that include balancing "delicate terracotta figures" on the head while the arms and torso are moving. This tradition continued among Africans taken to America during the Atlantic slave trade. African-Americans in the 19th century had a popular type of dance competition called "set the floor" ("set de flo'"), during which individual dancers would take turns dancing. Competing dancers would try to perform complicated steps given to them by a caller (usually a fiddler), without stepping outside the bounds of a circle drawn on the ground. To add to the challenge, some dancers would compete while balancing a glass full of water on top of their heads, trying not to spill the water while they danced.

== Comportment ==
During the Victorian era, when finishing schools for young women were at their peak and manners and comportment were more rigid, young women were sometimes instructed to improve their posture by balancing books or a teacup and saucer on their heads while walking and getting up or down from a chair. They were told to model themselves after "the Egyptian water-carrier, with the jug of water poised so prettily on her head, and her figure so straight and beautiful".

== Health impact ==
A prospective case-control study conducted in 2020 showed that "carrying a load on the head leads to accelerated degenerative changes, which involve the upper cervical spine more than the lower cervical spine and predisposes it to injury at a lower threshold. Thus, alternative methods of carrying loads should be proposed."

== See also ==
- Human-powered transport
- Land transport
- Matki (earthen pot)
- Tumpline
