= Mallam Interchange =

Coordinates: 5.571264°N 0.284093°W

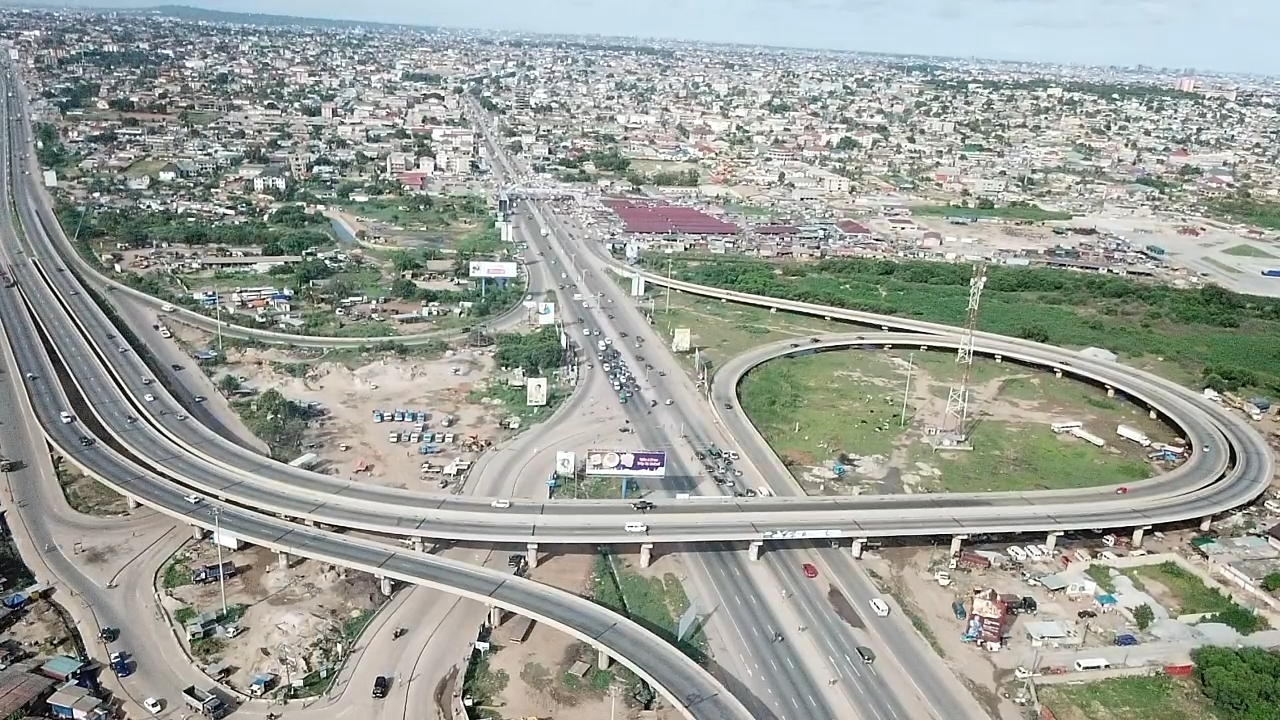
Mallam Junction Interchange in Accra

The Mallam Interchange is a dual carriage road system flyover in Accra in the Greater Accra Region of Ghana. It is part of the six-lane, 14-kilometre (8.7 mi) George Walker Bush Highway funded by the United States' Millennium Challenge Corporation.
