= Ako Adjei Interchange =

Ako-Adjei Interchange
- Sankara Interchange
- Interactive map of Ako-Adjei Interchange

Location
- Accra, Ghana
- Coordinates: 5°34′19″N 0°11′25″W
- Roads at junction: Ring Road Central; Independence Avenue; Liberation Road

Construction
- Constructed: September 1997
- Opened: December 1999

The Ako-Adjei Interchange is a flyover in Accra, Ghana. Until 2005 it was known as the Sankara Interchange. The construction of interchange started in September 1997 and ended in December 1999. It was constructed during the Jerry Rawlings administration and was the first interchange to be built in Ghana.

== Location ==
The interchange is located between Ring Road Central and Independence Avenue and is along Liberation Road in Accra with links towards the 37 Military Hospital, the Police headquarters. It is arguably one of Ghana's most used flyovers.

== History ==
The site of the interchange was prior to its construction a major roundabout. The roundabout had several name changes from the Akuafo Roundabout to Redemption Circle to the Sankara Circle. The names given to the roundabout represented the identities and interests of various Ghanaian political leader in Ghana's political history. When construction of the interchange begun in 1997 it was to replace the Sankara Roundabout. Upon completion the interchange was named the Sankara Interchange. Captain Thomas Sankara was a military ruler of Burkina Faso.

=== Renaming ===
In March of 2005, the Sankara Interchange was renamed to Ako Adjei Interchange, modeled after Dr. Ebenezer Ako Adjei, who was a lawyer and founding member of the United Gold Coast Convention (UGCC) and a famous member of The Big Six (Ghana). The renaming was graciously accepted by his daughter, Naa Astia Yaoley.
