= Kasoa Interchange =

Road interchange in Ghana

Kasoa Interchange is an ongoing project to ease the vehicular congestion on the Accra-Cape Coast highway.

== Scope ==
The project has been divided into three phases. In all, a new 33 kilometer Kasoa-Oboum road will be constructed. There will be an interchange constructed at the Kasoa Junction. The project also includes a two 12-classroom blocks, 12-unit classroom blocks, one polyclinic with all accessories, 10 mechanized bore-holes, and 20 kilometers of local roads would be constructed around Kasoa area, as well as a walk-over at Iron City.
