= Asafo Interchange =

Location
- Kumasi, Ashanti

Construction
- Constructed: 2005
- Opened: 9 November 2007

The Asafo Interchange is a dual carriage road system interchange in Kumasi the capital of Ashanti.

== History ==
The construction of the interchange was necessitated by the huge traffic jams that surrounded the Asafo market area in Kumasi. The streets around the market led to the Kejetia market, West Africa's largest open market. The Kufuor administration in 2005 awarded the contract for the construction of the interchange to ease the traffic situation. The interchange cost was over $45 million and was commissioned on 9 November 2007. It was built by two Italian construction firms which worked together by the name Sarroch Gelfi JV. under one Project Manager by the name David Steinberger together with one Concrete Construction Manager who managed the entire site by the name Mohamed Ghoneim. During the construction, it was re-designed to suit the muddy organic materials which were found during the excavations for building the interchange concrete basements. As commended by the project manager, the construction of this important project in Kumasi was completed thanks to the hard work done by the local Kumasi staff employed by the contractors and from the other side by the professional supervising team from the local ministry of roads the DUR (The Department of Urban Roads) Kumasi.

== Garden city ==
The construction of the interchange was part of several developmental projects that the then government initiated to improve the landscape of Kumasi so as to restore the city to its former status as Ashanti's Garden City. The interchange was the first to be built in the Ashanti region.

== Financial support ==
Money for the construction of the interchange came from the Government of Ghana as well as the World Bank, the Agence Française de Développement (AFD) and the Global Environmental Fund.

== Naming controversy ==
Prior to the commissioning of the interchange, Nana Ampofo Kyei Baffour, chief of Asem, complained about the name for the interchange. Asem is the town in which the interchange is located. The chief wanted the interchange named after the town - Asem. He was of the view that major landmarks in his town such as the Asafo market, had all been named with no mention to his town. Though his submissions to town authorities on the matter were rejected, Baffour vowed to continue until the interchange was renamed.
