= Mallam Atta market =

The Mallam Atta Market) is a major commercial market in the Greater Accra Region of Ghana. It is located off the Accra New Town Road. It offers a wide range of goods and services. The market is believed to have started in the late 1950s and grown to become a landmark housing financial institutions, printing houses, wholesale and retail shops, a Pre-school and many other ancillary facilities.
