= George Walker Bush Highway =

Highway in Ghana

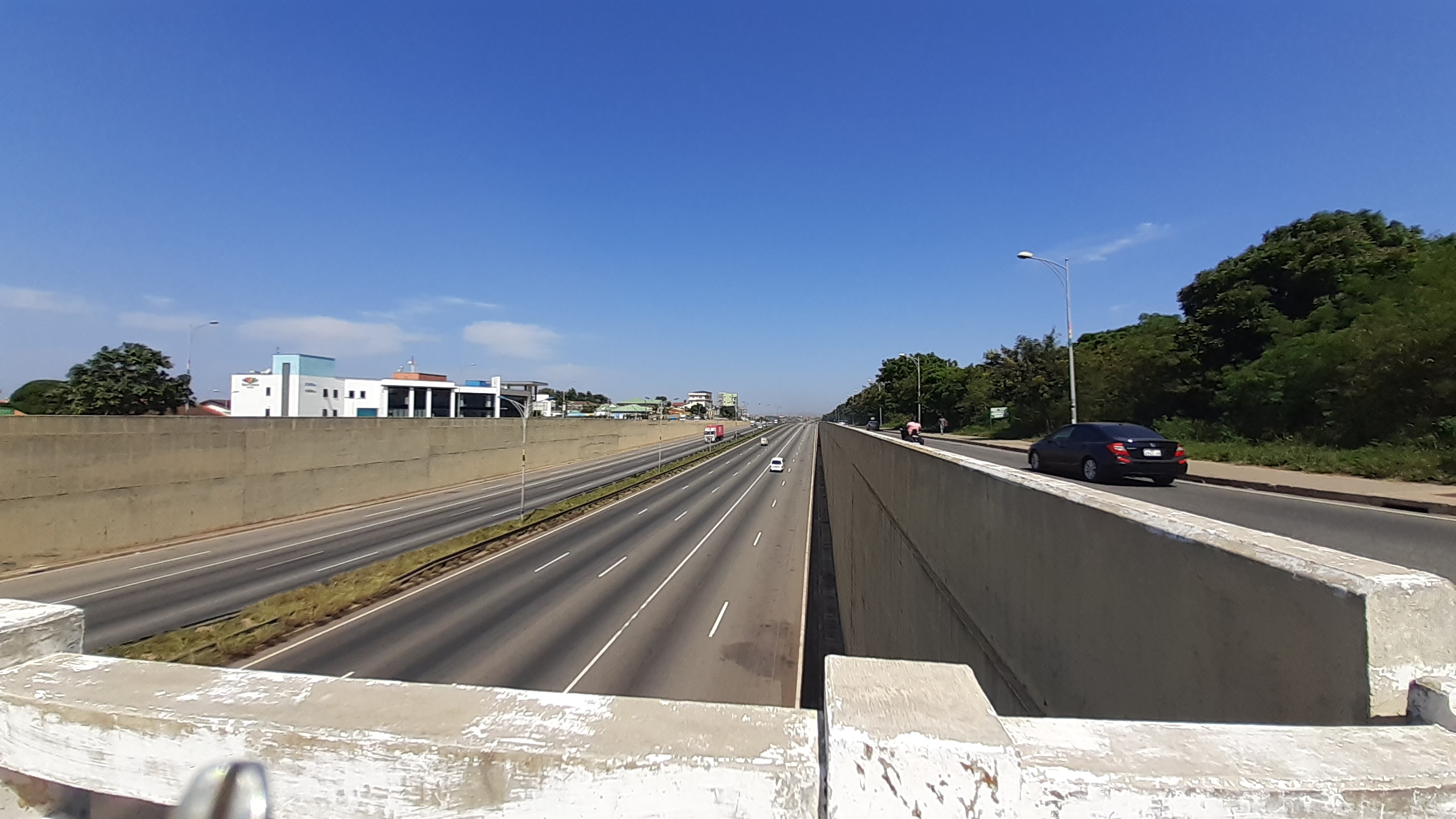
George Walker Bush Highway

The George Walker Bush Highway is a six-lane, 14-kilometre (8.7 mi) highway in the Greater Accra Region of Ghana. It is also known as the Mallam–Tetteh Quashie Highway as the highway links the urban town of Mallam to Lapaz, Achimota, Legon interchange, Dzorwulu and the Tetteh Quarshie Interchange. The construction of the highway was financed by the Millennium Challenge Account. The highway, named after former United States President George W. Bush, was officially opened to motorists on 15 February 2012 by President John Atta Mills. The highway forms part of the N1 highway.
