= Natural disasters in Ghana =

Ghana is prone to a range of natural disasters, including floods, droughts, landslides, fires, and, on rare occasions, earthquakes. Among these, floods are the most common, often leading to outbreaks of waterborne diseases such as cholera, typhoid, and malaria. Historically, disaster management in Ghana has been largely reactive, focusing on response and relief efforts. However, in recent years, there has been a shift towards prevention and mitigation, with efforts to integrate disaster risk reduction and climate change adaptation into development planning.

The National Disaster Management Organization (NADMO), established in 1996, plays a key role in coordinating disaster response in Ghana. While NADMO has made efforts in managing post-disaster recovery, its efforts are often limited by resource constraints, resulting in a stronger focus on post-disaster relief rather than proactive disaster preparedness. Despite these challenges, there have been improvements in disaster management, driven by the increasing recognition of the need for comprehensive disaster risk reduction policies at national, regional, and local levels.

== List of natural disasters in Ghana ==
By Drought

- 1983 famine in Ghana

By Earthquake

- List of earthquakes in Ghana

By Flood

- 2015 Accra floods
- 2016 Accra floods
- 2020 African Sahel floods
- 2022 Accra floods
- 2009 West Africa floods
- 2023 Akosombo dam spillage fl2023 Akosombo dam spillage flood
- 2010 Agona Swedru floods
- 2011 Atiwa floods
