= Floods in Ghana =

Series of flood incidents

Floods in Ghana refer to a series of flood incidents that have caused property damage and loss of life. Floods are caused by excessive rainfall and dam spillages. Flooding is a recurring natural disaster that has become a defining challenge for the country's environmental, economic, and political discourse. Ghana's tropical climate typically has two main seasons: a dry season and a rainy season. There is the major rainy season and the minor rainy season. In southern Ghana, the major rainy season occurs from April to mid-June, while the minor rainy season typically runs from September to November. The dry season generally extends from December to March although these patterns vary slightly in recent years due to climate change. Ghana's ecology, characterized by distinct rainy seasons, predisposes both coastal and inland regions to heavy rainfall and subsequent flooding. The intense major rainy season and climate change has contributed to the growing severity and the frequency of flood events across the nation.

The impact of flooding is a complex dynamic. In urban centres such as Accra, chronic flooding disrupts transportation network, displaces communities, claims lives, and strains the state's limited emergency response systems like the National Disaster Management Organization (NADMO). Rural and urban communities are equally affected during floods as these events lead to immediate material and human losses but also impose long-term economic burdens by diverting public resources towards recovery. The cost of repeated flood damage affects national development and compromises efforts to address other socio-economic challenges. Politically, flooding has emerged as a contentious issue linked with government, policymaking, urban planning, public accountability, and to some extent, corruption. Historical and contemporary flood has revealed significant gaps in urban planning and disaster management strategies and influencing electoral politics.

== Causes of flooding ==
Over the years Ghana has experienced floods across different regions notably caused by several factors such as:

- Heavy rainfall, using in a short period of time
- Poor disposal of solid waste
- Poor, uncoordinated land use planning, leading to vulnerable settlements
- Low-lying and flat lands
- Cases of dam spillage
  For instance, on June 3rd, 2015, Accra, heavy rainfall in Ghana's capital led to flooding. The main contributing factors were choked gutters that blocked drainage systems and improper settlements. Over 200 people lost their lives due to a petrol station explosion during the flood. In 2021, heavy rainfall caused floods in the Kumasi Metropolis, resulting in the loss of lives 4 people and displacement of 200 others. This flood was caused by heavy rainfall. In the Volta Region and the Eastern Region of Ghana, severe floods occurred after the Akosombo Dam was spilled, displacing 26,000 people from their homes in 2023.

Reports from the BBC attributed the flood to heavy rainfall which caused the Volta River Authority to spill the dam. Below is a list of floods.

== List of floods ==
- 2026 Ghana floods
- 2023 Akosombo dam spillage flood
- 2023 Accra circle floods
- 2022 Accra floods
- 2020 African Sahel floods
- 2016 Accra floods
- 2011 Atiwa floods
- 2010 Agona Swedru floods
- 2009 West Africa floods
