= Floods in Africa =

Floods in Africa have led to large losses of life over many decades. In recent years, the effects of floods have been exacerbated by climate change.

== By year ==
- 2007 African floods
- 2009 West Africa floods
- 2010 West African floods
- 2015 Southeast Africa floods
- 2018 East Africa floods
- 2020 East Africa floods
- 2020 African Sahel floods
- 2022 Africa floods
- 2023 Africa floods
- 2025 Africa floods

== By country ==
- Floods in South Sudan
- List of Sudan floods
- 2025 Botswana Floods
- 2025 South Africa floods

== See also ==
- Climate change in Africa
- Water scarcity in Africa
