= 2023 Ghana floods =

Major floods in Ghana in 2023

Here is a list of all floods which occurred in Ghana in 2023 across all regions.

== March 7th - Greater Accra ==
The 2023 Accra Flood occurred on March 7, 2023, after several hours of heavy rainfall in Accra, the capital of Ghana. The Ghana Meteorological Agency had warned of a rain-bearing cloud affecting southeastern Ghana, including parts of Greater Accra, Eastern, Central, and Western regions.

The flooding severely disrupted traffic and submerged roads, particularly around Kwame Nkrumah Circle, where large amounts of garbage were dumped onto the streets. Tragically, two children died when a building collapsed in Ngleshi Amanfro, and another person was electrocuted in floodwaters in Mallam West. The floods reignited discussions on flood prevention in Accra, with concerns over buildings in flood-prone areas and inadequate drainage systems. These issues have been under scrutiny since 2015, following a deadly flood-related fire at a petrol station.

== 21st June - Western Region ==
In Western, and Ashanti. Heavy rainfall that began on June 21 caused widespread flooding, leading to road blockages and severe traffic disruptions, particularly in the Ga South and Ga East Municipalities of Greater Accra. The floods caused significant damage to property, including the destruction of around 50 homes in the Ahanta West Municipality of the Western Region. In addition, rivers like the Bonsa and Subri overflowed, exacerbating the situation and displacing many residents. Tragically, at least eight people lost their lives across the affected regions, with fatalities reported in Ashanti and Western due to drowning and flood-related incidents. Earlier in June, flooding in the Volta Region displaced approximately 3,000 people in the Keta Municipal District.

== 15th September-Volta Region ==
In September 2023, heavy rainfall and high water inflows into the Akosombo and Kpong dam reservoirs led to significant flooding in southeastern Ghana. The Volta River Authority initiated a controlled spillage of water from both the Akosombo and Kpong hydroelectric dams on September 15, 2023, which has since caused widespread flooding downstream. The spillage has impacted communities in the Volta, Eastern, and Greater Accra regions.

By mid-October 2023, more than 26,000 people had been displaced due to the rising floodwaters. This number increased to 30,000 by late November, with eight districts in the Volta Region particularly affected. The floods caused widespread damage to infrastructure, crops, and homes, creating a severe humanitarian challenge as access to essential services was disrupted.
