= Urban flooding =

Type of flood event in cities

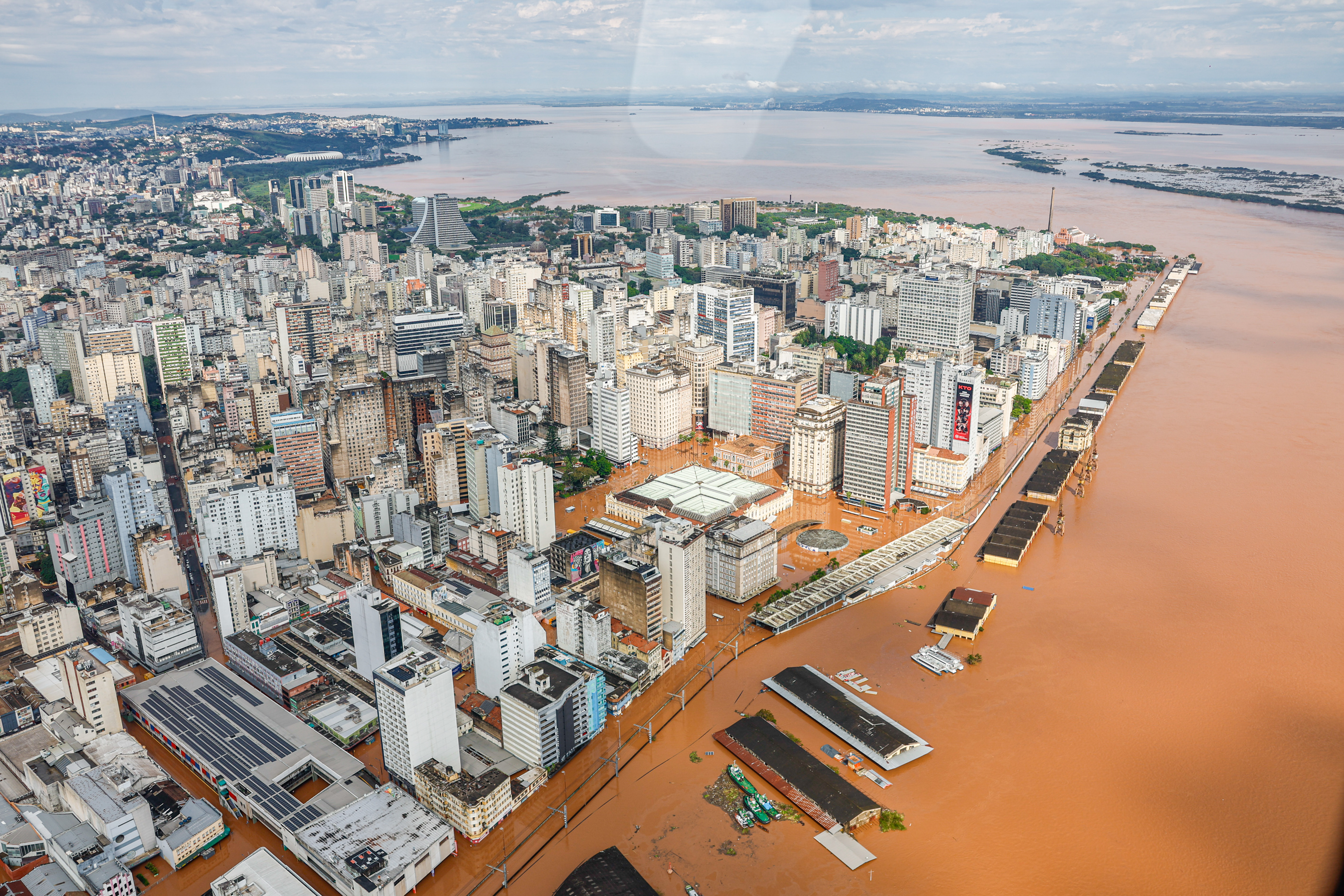
Flooding in Porto Alegre of the Lagoa dos Patos in Brazil during May 2024

Urban flooding is the inundation of land or property in cities or other built environment, caused by rainfall or coastal storm surges overwhelming the capacity of drainage systems, such as storm sewers. Urban flooding can occur regardless of whether or not affected communities are located within designated floodplains or near any body of water. It is triggered for example by an overflow of rivers and lakes, flash flooding or snowmelt. During the flood, stormwater or water released from damaged water mains may accumulate on property and in public rights-of-way. It can seep through building walls and floors, or backup into buildings through sewer pipes, cellars, toilets and sinks.

There are several types of urban flooding, each with a different cause. City planners distinguish pluvial flooding (flooding caused by heavy rain), fluvial flooding (caused by a nearby river overflowing its banks), or coastal flooding (often caused by storm surges). Urban flooding is a hazard to both the population and infrastructure. Some well known disaster events include the inundations of Nîmes (France) in 1998 and Vaison-la-Romaine (France) in 1992, the flooding of New Orleans (United States) in 2005, and the flooding in Rockhampton, Bundaberg, Brisbane during the 2010–2011 Queensland floods in Australia, the 2022 eastern Australia floods, and more recently the 2024 Rio Grande do Sul floods in Brazil.

In urban areas, flood effects can be made worse by existing paved streets and roads which increase the speed of flowing water. Impervious surfaces prevent rainfall from infiltrating into the ground, thereby causing a higher surface run-off that may by higher than the local drainage capacity. The effects of climate change on the water cycle can also change the severity and frequency of urban flooding. This applies in particular to coastal cities which may be affected by sea level rise and higher rainfall intensity.

To reduce urban flooding, city planners can use for example the following approaches: building gray infrastructure, using green infrastructure, improving drainage systems, and understanding and altering land use. In general terms, integrated urban water management can help with reducing urban floods.

== Causes ==
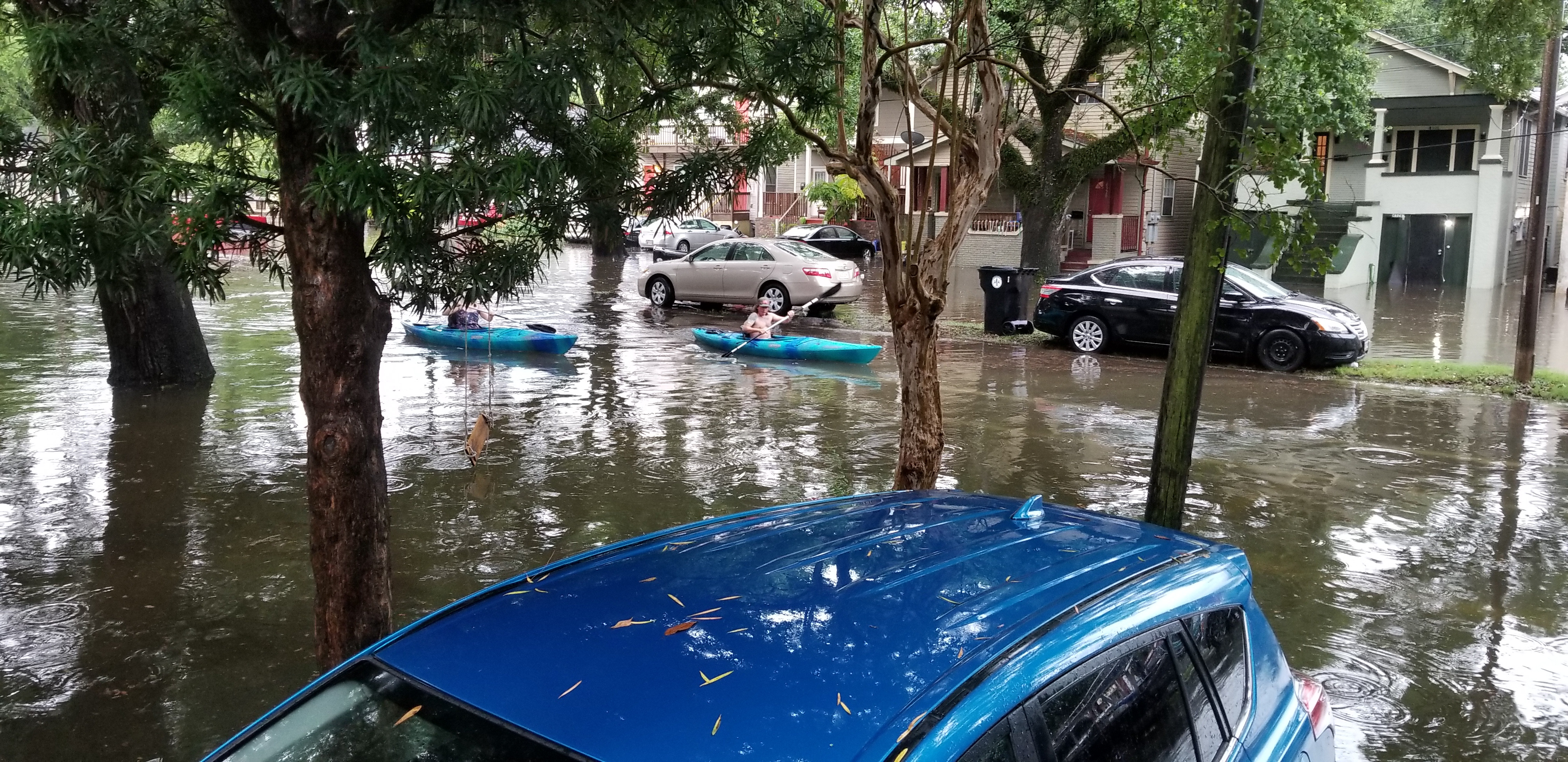
People kayaking down a street in Mid-City New Orleans following flooding in 2019

There are several types of urban flooding, each with a different cause:

- Pluvial (flooding caused by heavy rain),
- Fluvial (caused by a nearby river overflowing its banks), and
- Coastal flooding (often caused by storm surges).

Different types of urban flooding create different impacts and require different mitigation strategies.

Any activities that enlarge the impermeable surface areas in a city can increase the flood risk. Impermeable surface areas are generated through soil sealing as this reduces drainage options of floodwaters. As the pace of urbanization accelerates around the world, urban flooding has the potential to affect more people.

Some researchers have mentioned the storage effect in urban areas with transportation corridors created by cut and fill. Culverted fills may be converted to impoundments if the culverts become blocked by debris, and flow may be diverted along streets. Several studies have looked into the flow patterns and redistribution in streets during storm events and the implication on flood modelling.

=== Links to climate change ===
Many of the common causes of urban flooding, including storm surges, heavy precipitation, and river overflow, are expected to increase in frequency and severity as climate change intensifies and causes increases in ocean and river levels. In particular, erratic rainfall patterns are expected to increase the frequency and severity of both pluvial flooding (as excessive amounts of rainfall in urban areas and cannot be adequately absorbed by existing drainage systems and pervious areas) and fluvial flooding (as excessive rainfall over a river can cause flooding and overflow, either where it occurs or downstream along the path of the river). The severity of extreme storm events, including hurricanes and other types of tropical cyclones, are also expected to increase. Additionally, due to the geographic distribution of developing urban areas, the land area potentially exposed to climate change-related flooding is expected to increase significantly.

Coastal cities may be particularly affected by sea level rise and higher rainfall intensity.

Due to an increase in heavy rainfall events, floods are likely to become more severe when they do occur. The interactions between rainfall and flooding are complex. There are some regions in which flooding is expected to become rarer. This depends on several factors. These include changes in rain and snowmelt, but also soil moisture. Climate change leaves soils drier in some areas, so they may absorb rainfall more quickly. This leads to less flooding. Dry soils can also become harder. In this case heavy rainfall runs off into rivers and lakes. This increases risks of flooding.

== Impacts ==
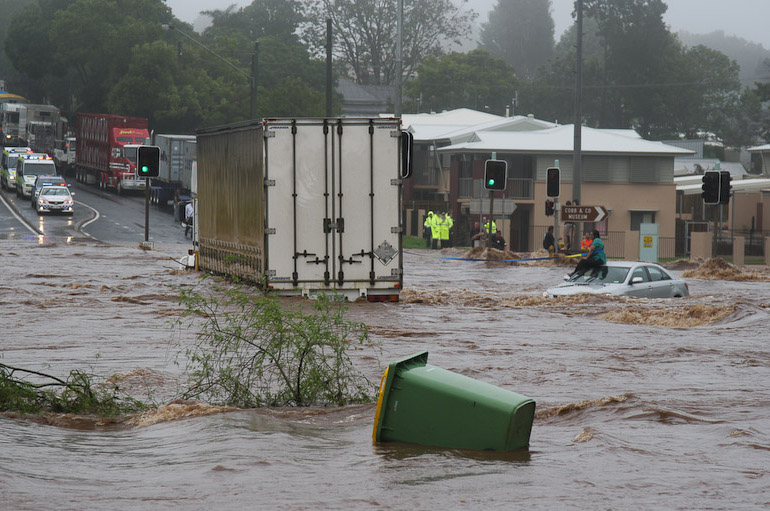
Trapped woman on a car roof during flash flooding in Toowoomba, Queensland, Australia

Some of the most obvious impacts of urban flooding are those to human life and to property damage. In 2020, floods caused an estimated 6,000 deaths and caused US$51.3B in damages globally. Residents at low-elevated regions are often at risk of inundation, financial loss, and even the loss of lives.

Urban flooding also impacts critical public services, including public transportation systems. Traffic congestion can be worsened by urban flood events.

=== Economic impacts ===
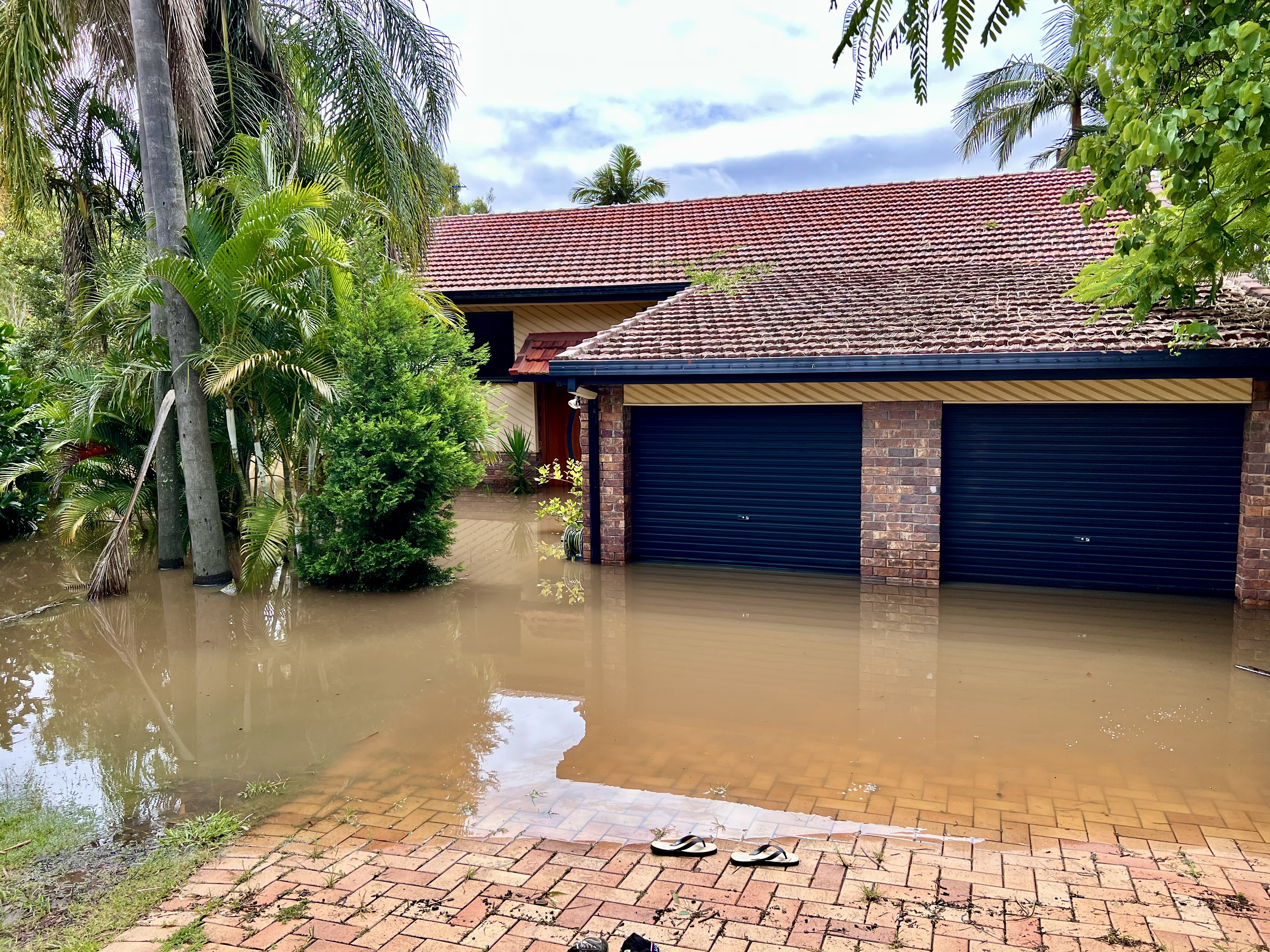
Houses in Corinda flooded during 2022 eastern Australia floods

The IPCC summarized the current research regarding economic impacts as follows (as of 2022): "economic risks associated with future surface water flooding in towns and cities are considerable." This is explained as part of the dynamic Interaction of urban systems with climate.

Urban flooding has significant economic implications. In the U.S., industry experts estimate that wet basements can lower property values by 10%-25% and are cited among the top reasons for not purchasing a home. According to the U.S. Federal Emergency Management Agency (FEMA), almost 40% of small businesses never reopen their doors following a flooding disaster. In the UK, urban flooding is estimated to cost £270 million a year in England and Wales; 80,000 homes are at risk.

A study of Cook County, Illinois, identified 177,000 property damage insurance claims made across 96% of the county's ZIP codes over a five-year period from 2007 to 2011. This is the equivalent of one in six properties in the County making a claim. Average payouts per claim were $3,733 across all types of claims, with total claims amounting to $660 million over the five years examined.

Urban flooding can also create far-reaching supply chain issues, which can create significant interruptions in the availability of goods and services, as well as financial losses for businesses.

Between 1961 and 2020, nearly 10,000 cases were reported with 1.3 million deaths and a minimum of US$3.3 trillion of financial losses at an equivalent loss rate of almost US$1800 per second. On average, the total reported deaths worldwide were around 23,000/year for the past 6 decades at an equivalent rate of one death every 24 min.

== Modeling ==
=== Localized models ===
Flood modeling is often conducted in a very localized fashion, with hydrological models created for individual municipalities and incorporating details about buildings, infrastructure, vegetation, land use, and drainage systems. This localized modeling can be very useful, especially when paired with historical data, in predicting which specific locations (e.g. streets or intersections) will be the most impacted during a flood event and can be helpful in designing effective mitigation systems specific to local needs.

Flood flows in urban environments have been investigated relatively recently despite many centuries of flood events. Some researchers mentioned the storage effect in urban areas. Several studies looked into the flow patterns and redistribution in streets during storm events and the implication in terms of flood modelling. Some recent research considered the criteria for safe evacuation of individuals in flooded areas. But some recent field measurements during the 2010–2011 Queensland floods showed that any criterion solely based upon the flow velocity, water depth or specific momentum cannot account for the hazards caused by the velocity and water depth fluctuations. These considerations ignore further the risks associated with large debris entrained by the flow motion.

The curve number (CN) rainfall–runoff model is widely adopted. However, it had been reported to repeatedly fail in consistently predicting runoff results worldwide. Unlike the existing antecedent moisture condition concept, one of the recent studies preserved the parsimonious curve number runoff predictive basic framework for model calibration according to different watershed's saturation conditions under guidance from inferential statistics. The study also showed that the existing CN runoff predictive model was not statistically significant without recalibration. CN runoff predictive model can be calibrated according to regional rainfall-runoff dataset for urban flash flood prediction.

In urban environments, predicting flood inundation requires resolving highly complex surface routing across impervious surfaces, street networks, and built infrastructure. Two-dimensional (2D) coupled hydrologic-hydraulic models, such as CREST-iMAP and Inunda, address these dynamics by simultaneously simulating the initial rainfall-runoff generation process and the physical routing of the resulting surface water. Unlike standalone hydrologic models that estimate streamflow at specific basin outlets, or pure hydraulic models that require pre-calculated flow boundary conditions, coupled frameworks dynamically exchange data between the terrestrial water balance and overland flow equations. This integrated approach enables hyper-resolution flood inundation mapping, allowing for the representation of rapid onset accumulation and distributed overland flow pathways characteristic of urban flash flood events.

=== Modeling of climate change impacts ===
Modeling of climate change impacts, on the other hand, is often done from a "top-down", global perspective. While these models can be helpful in predicting worldwide effects of global warming and in raising awareness about large-scale impacts, their spatial resolution is often limited to 25 km or more, making them less helpful for local planners in mitigating the effects of climate change on a street-by-street scale.

Some advocate for an integration of localized hydrological modeling with larger-scale climate modeling, claiming that such integration allows the benefits of both forms of modeling to be realized simultaneously and creates the potential for modeling flooding due to climate change in a way that allows planners to design specific strategies to mitigate it at the local level.

Scientists investigate climate change scenarios and their impacts on urban flooding and found that: "For example in the UK, expected annual damages from surface water may increase by £60–200 million for projected 2–4°C warming scenarios; enhanced adaptation actions could manage flooding up to a 2°C scenario but will be insufficient beyond that.

== Mitigation and management ==
Flood flows in urban environments have been studied relatively recently despite many centuries of flood events. Some recent research has considered the criteria for safe evacuation of individuals in flooded areas.

=== Building gray infrastructure ===
One traditional urban flooding management strategy is building gray infrastructure, which is a set of infrastructure types (including dams and seawalls) traditionally constructed of concrete or other impervious materials and designed to prevent the flow of water. While gray infrastructure can be effective in preventing flooding-related damage and can be economically valuable, some models suggest that gray infrastructure may become less effective at preventing flood-related impacts in urban areas in the future as climate change causes flooding intensity and frequency to increase.

=== Using green infrastructure ===
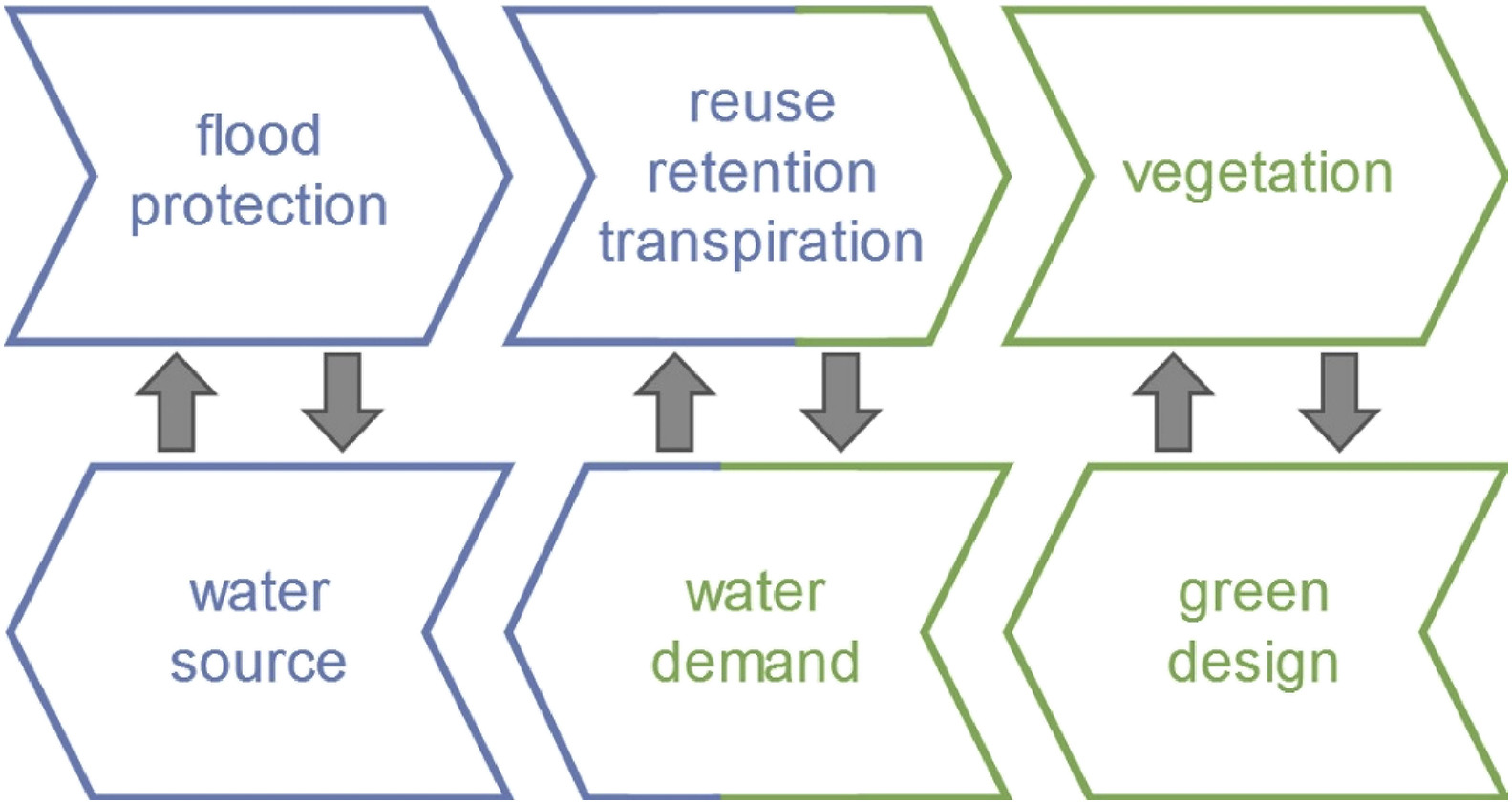
A schematic showing how green infrastructure and water management can be integrated

An alternative to gray infrastructure is green infrastructure, which refers to a set of strategies for absorbing and storing stormwater at or close to the location where it falls. Green infrastructure includes many types of vegetation, large open areas with pervious surfaces, and even rainwater collection devices. Green infrastructure may prove to be an effective and cost-efficient way to reduce the extent of urban flooding. An example of usage of green infrastructure is the idea of "sponge cities".

=== Improving drainage systems ===
One way urban flooding is commonly mitigated is via urban drainage systems, which transport storm water away from streets and businesses and into appropriate storage and drainage areas. While urban drainage systems help municipalities manage flooding and can be scaled up as population and urban extent increase, these systems may not be sufficient to mitigate additional future flooding due to climate change.

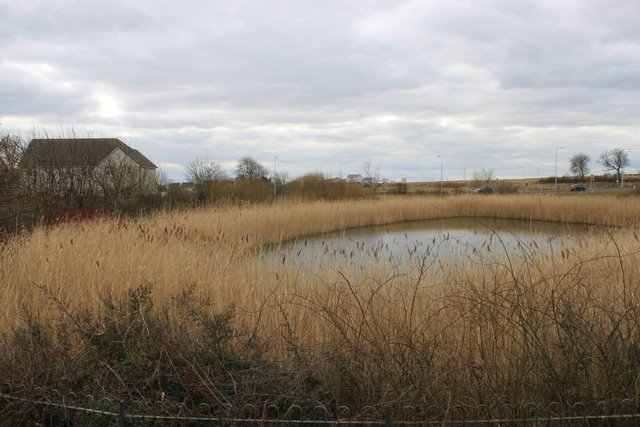
Retention ponds such as this one in Dunfermline, Scotland, are considered components of a sustainable drainage system.

Sustainable drainage systems (also known as SuDS, SUDS, or sustainable urban drainage systems) are a collection of water management practices that aim to align modern drainage systems with natural water processes and are part of a larger green infrastructure strategy. SuDS efforts make urban drainage systems more compatible with components of the natural water cycle such as storm surge overflows, soil percolation, and bio-filtration. These efforts hope to mitigate the effect human development has had or may have on the natural water cycle, particularly surface runoff and water pollution trends.

SuDS have become popular in recent decades as understanding of how urban development affects natural environments, as well as concern for climate change and sustainability, have increased. SuDS often use built components that mimic natural features in order to integrate urban drainage systems into the natural drainage systems or a site as efficiently and quickly as possible. SUDS infrastructure has become a large part of the Blue-Green Cities demonstration project in Newcastle upon Tyne.

=== Understanding and altering land use ===
Since the ratio of pervious to impervious surfaces across an area is important in flooding management, understanding and altering land use and the proportion of land allocated to different purposes/use types is important in flood management planning. In particular, increasing the percent of land dedicated to open, vegetated space can be helpful in providing an absorption and storage area for storm runoff. These areas can often be integrated with existing urban amenities, such as parks and golf courses. Increasing the pervious surface fraction of an urban area (e.g. by planting green walls/roofs or using alternative pervious construction materials) can also help de-risk climate-linked flood events.

=== Integrated urban water management ===
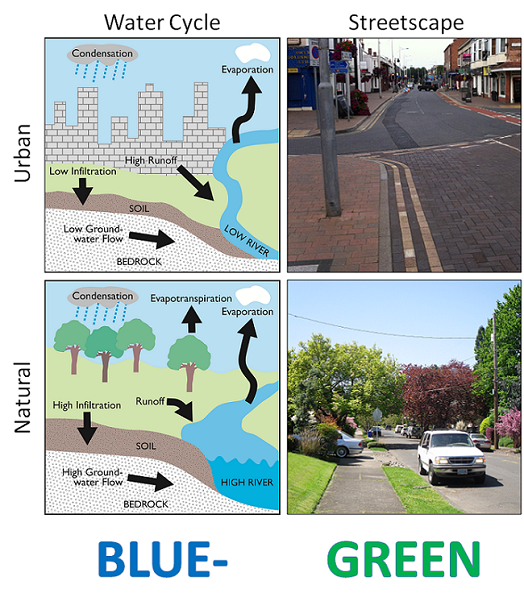
Comparing the natural and urban water cycle and streetscapes in conventional and Blue-Green Cities

Integrated urban water management (IUWM) is the practice of managing freshwater, wastewater, and storm water as components of a basin-wide management plan. It builds on existing water supply and sanitation considerations within an urban settlement by incorporating urban water management within the scope of the entire river basin. IUWM is commonly seen as a strategy for achieving the goals of Water Sensitive Urban Design. IUWM seeks to change the impact of urban development on the natural water cycle, based on the premise that by managing the urban water cycle as a whole; a more efficient use of resources can be achieved providing not only economic benefits but also improved social and environmental outcomes. One approach is to establish an inner, urban, water cycle loop through the implementation of reuse strategies. Developing this urban water cycle loop requires an understanding both of the natural, pre-development, water balance and the post-development water balance. Accounting for flows in the pre- and post-development systems is an important step toward limiting urban impacts on the natural water cycle.

== Examples ==
=== By country or region ===
- Worldwide: List of floods
- Africa: Floods in Africa
- Australia: Floods in Australia
- The Netherlands: Floods in the Netherlands
- United States: Lists of floods in the United States
- North Sea: Storm tides of the North Sea
- China: Floods in China

=== United States ===
One of the most well known at-risk urban areas in the United States is New Orleans. Because of its coastal location and low elevation, the city is prone to flooding due to tropical storms, including cyclones and hurricanes and is particularly vulnerable to changes in sea level or storm frequency. In 2005, Hurricane Katrina caused more than 1800 deaths and US$170B in damages. After Katrina, additional flood protections were built with a changing climate in mind; these protections have proved effective in reducing damages due to subsequent extreme weather events, such as Hurricane Ida.

During the summer of 2021, Hurricanes Henri and Ida caused significant flooding in many cities along the east coast of the United States. In particular, New York City experienced record levels of rainfall, prompting many to question whether the city should implement additional flood protection measures in anticipation of potential future flood events. In September 2021, the New York City mayoral office released a new rainfall preparedness plan.

== See also ==
- Climate change adaptation#Flooding
- Nature-based solutions – Sustainable use of nature for tackling socio-environmental challenges
