= 2026 Ghana floods =

Major floods in Ghana in 2026

The 2026 Ghana floods took place at the end of June 2026, and affected the capital city of the country, Accra and its surrounding areas such as Kaneshie, Adabraka, Circle, Weija, Adentan, East Legon, Achimota, Spintex, Teshie, and sections around the Kwame Nkrumah Interchange. The Deputy Director-General (Operations) of the Ghana Meteoroligical Agency (GMet), Dr Ignatius Kweku Williams encouraged the public to always check for updates from the agency.

According to the Ghana Interior Minister Mubarak Mohammed Muntaka, the month of June 2026 observed the greatest rainfall of 593.2 millimetres since 1995. The heavy rainfall which lead to this flooding recorded 169.2 millimetres within 24 hours.

The Ghana Meteorological Agency initially alerted residents living in parts of Greater Accra, Central, Ashanti, and Eastern regions about heavy rainfalls between June and early July. They have predicted a total rainfall within this period as 100 and 150 millimetres.

== Causes ==
This flooding was mainly caused by building on waterways and by disposal of waste into drainage systems. The Convention People’s Party (CPP) described this incident as a "self-inflicted" disaster and encouraged the citizens to stay peaceful, alert and avoid flood-prone areas. However, they also advised the Minister of Energy, John Jinapor to disconnect electricity supply to all flood-affected areas.

The 2023 Ghana floods was also caused by heavy rainfall on 7th March 2023.

== Impact ==
According to the National Disaster Management Organization (NADMO) about 3,000 residents in Accra's Odawna area were affected.

In the Western region, more than 24 buildings crumbled in Samreboi-Asankragwa due to the flooding.

As at 30 June 2026, twelve people were confirmed dead as a result of the flooding. The death toll increased to 13 people on the next day. According to the Ghana National Fire Service (GNF), the death toll is likely to increase though they have saved more than 470 people.

The flooding triggered fire at a rubber factory closer to Kwame Nkrumah circle.

== Interventions ==
The Ghanaian President, John Mahama, ordered the deployment of the Ghana Armed Forces and police personnel to support NADMO in their rescue operations in the capital. Subsequently the government of Ghana responded to the challenges of sanitation which is one of the major causes of the recent flooding in the country by cooperating with Zoomlion Ghana Limited to reactivate Achimota-Abofu Transfer Station to revive waste collection services in Greater Accra Metropolitan Area. The Minister for Local Government, Chieftaincy and Religious Affairs, Ahmed Ibrahim, made the information known to the public after inspecting the facility.

10th July- 11th was declared as National General Cleaning Days by President John Dramani Mahama to remove debris, desilt drains and disinfect flood-affected markets and public places to minimize risk of disease outbreaks and future flooding.

The finance minister, Dr Cassiel Ato Forson, sent GH¢350 million to NADMO to support the individuals that were affected by the flooding after the instruction of President John Dramani Mahama. The president ordered the release of this amount from the contingency fund.
