= Ministry of Communication, Digital Technology and Innovations (Ghana) =

Government ministry of Ghana

Agency overview
- Jurisdiction: Government of Ghana
- Headquarters: Accra, Ghana
- Minister responsible: Hon. Sam George
- Website: www.moc.gov.gh

The Ministry of Communication, Digital Technology and Innovations is a government ministry responsible for the development of communications and technology in Ghana. The ministry's offices are in Accra, Greater Accra.

The ministry's mission is to pursue policies that will lead to the creation of information and communications infrastructure, along with services to promote economic competitiveness. The missions purpose is to be in line with the policy guidelines of the Medium Term National Development Policy Framework (MTNDPF), developed as the basis of the Ghana Shared Growth and Development Agenda (GSGDA).

== Purpose ==
The Ministry of Communication was created out of the Ministry of Transport and Communications. Its mission is based on the following principles:

- To promote rapid development and deployment of a national ICT infrastructure in Ghana.
- To strengthen the institutional and regulatory model for managing the ICT sub-sector.
- To increase the use of ICT in all sectors of the economy to increase productivity.
- To facilitate the provision of quality meteorological data and forecasts to support weather-sensitive sectors of the economy.

== Departments and agencies ==
The Ministry of Communication, Digital Technology and Innovations is made up of the following agencies and statutory bodies:

1. Postal and Courier Services Regulatory Commission (PCSRC)
2. Ghana Domain Name Registry (GDNR)
3. Ghana Meteorological Agency (GMet)
4. Ghana-India Kofi Annan Centre of Excellence in ICT (AITI-KACE)
5. National Information Technology Agency (NITA)
6. Data Protection Commission (DPC)
7. National Communications Authority (NCA)
8. Ghana Investment Fund for Electronic Communications (GIFEC)
9. Ghana Post Company Limited (GPCL)

== Initiatives ==
- Ms Geek Competition - This is a competition launched in 2019 to support women between the ages of 13 and 25. It is aimed at developing ideas that seek to solve problems facing the nation.
- The Ministry of Communications has implemented a programme to develop the skills of girls and young women in information and communication technology (ICT) for national development. It aims to close the gender gap in the digital space. The initiative also aims to shed light on science, technology, engineering, and mathematics (STEM) research, by promoting women who are pursuing a career in these fields.
- The Ministry aims to implement a 5G network in collaboration with the Radisys Corporation. This collaboration will be delivered via the Next-Gen Infrastructure Company (NGIC). 55% of the company is owned by Ascend Digital Solutions Ltd. and K-NET.

== Airwaves clean-up ==
On February 11, 2025, Samuel Nartey George, Minister for Communication, ordered Gumah FM in Bawku shut down over national security concerns. Citing Section 13(1)(e) of the Electronic Communications Act, the NCA enforced the closure, alleging the station incited violence. Earlier, on January 17, 2025, he also shut down seven radio stations, including Fire Group (90.1 MHz) in Sunyani and Okyeame Radio in Bibiani, for security reasons or lack of valid frequency authorization. He pledged strict enforcement of media regulations.

== See also ==
- Minister for Communication (Ghana)
