= Apenorto Festival =

Festival in Ghana by the Mepe people in Volta region

Apenorto Festival (also known as Afenortoza) is an annual festival celebrated by the chiefs and people of the Mepe Traditional Area in the North Tongu District of the Volta Region of Ghana. It is one of the largest festivals in Ghana. It is usually celebrated from July through August Afenorto refers to a period of staying or resting at home. It is a period during which most occupational activities are suspended. Many citizens, both at home and abroad, take annual leave during this period. Activities associated with the festival include family reunions, the settlement of family disputes, discussions on development projects for the following year, prayers offered by religious groups in thanksgiving for a successful year, the pouring of libations, and funeral ceremonies. The grand durbar is held on the first Saturday in August.

== Celebrations ==
During Apenorto, Mepe comes alive with rich traditional ceremonies that go beyond the durbar of chiefs mentioned in the original article. The festival features the firing of musketry, the sounding of the talking drum (Atupani), and libation at Vesime, a historic site where twins were traditionally outdoored, followed by a colorful procession of chiefs and people to the durbar grounds amid drumming, dancing and the display of full customary regalia

Modern celebrations blend these age-old rituals with contemporary activities designed to involve the entire community. Recent editions have included health walks, fundraising events, beach entertainment, dances, and a competitive canoe regatta in which the various Mepe clans and social groups race on the river, turning the festival into both a cultural showcase and a lively community sports event.

== Organization ==
The Apenorto Festival is organized primarily by the Mepe Traditional Council in collaboration with the Mepe Development Association, which together plan the programme of rituals, durbars and community events for each year's edition. Their work includes selecting themes that reflect current priorities; such as post-flood recovery, investment and sustainable development and coordinating activities with local authorities and partners.

The festival attracts participation from Chiefs and Queen Mothers, Government Officials, Members of Parliament and citizens from the Mepe diaspora, who use the occasion as a homecoming to engage in discussions on development projects, support fundraising efforts and strengthen ties with the community.

== Significance ==
The festival is a period during which people take stock of the previous year. Plans for future community development are also initiated during the festival. The festival also provides opportunities for young people to meet potential spouses.In recent years, the festival has also served as a platform for community recovery and development messaging, especially after the 2023 Akosombo Dam flood disaster.
