= 37 Military Hospital =

Military Hospital in Accra, Ghana

Coordinates: 5.588577°N 0.183246°W

- Ministry of Health
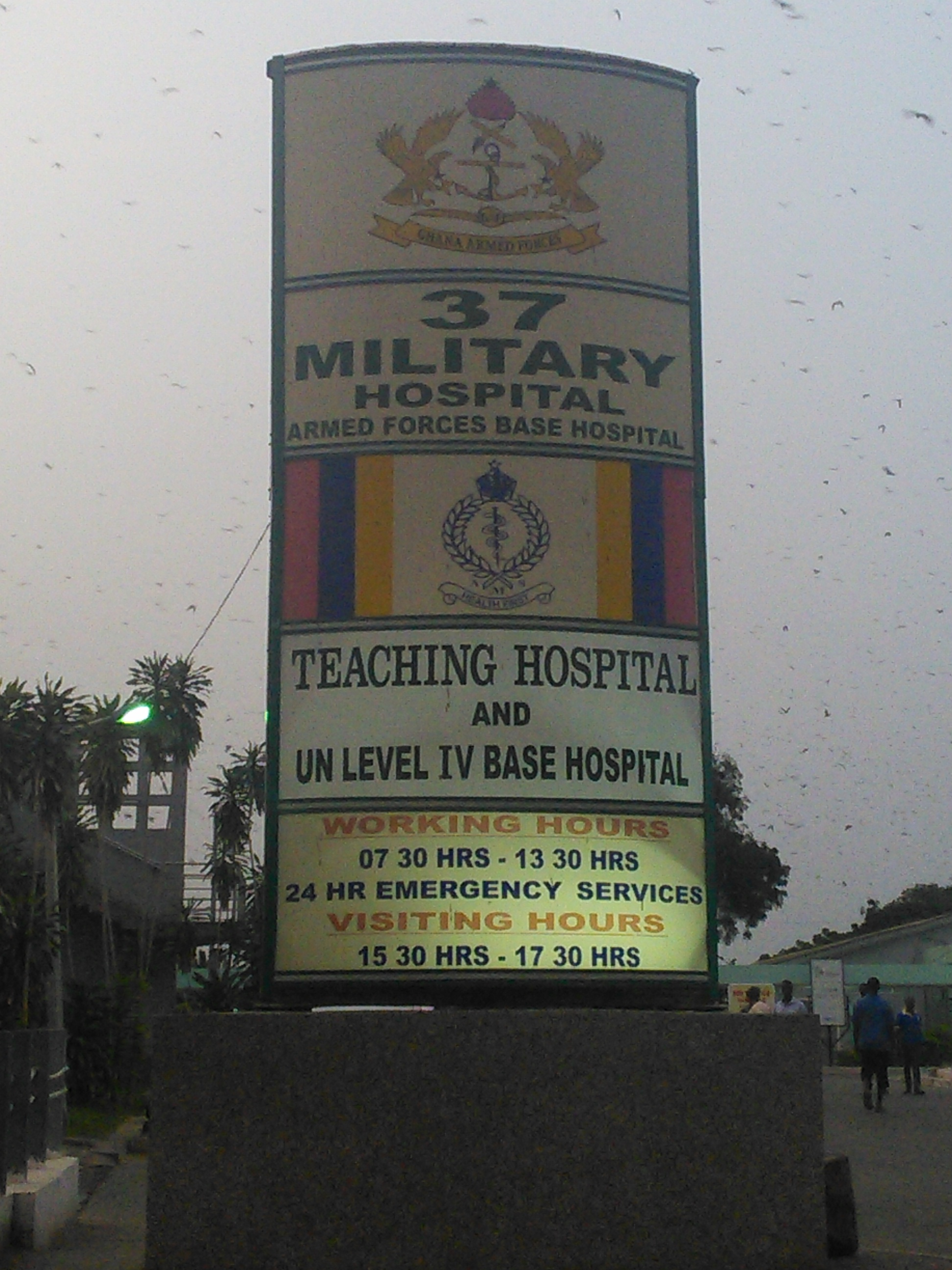
- Signpost at entrance

Geography
- Location: Accra, Greater Accra, Ghana

Organisation
- Care system: Public - Ghana Health Service

Services
- Beds: 700

History
- Founded: 1941; 85 years ago

The 37 Military Hospital is a specialist hospital located in Accra, on the main road between the Accra International Airport and central Accra. It is the largest military hospital in the Republic of Ghana. It was named "37" because it was the 37th military hospital to be built in the British colony of West Africa. The hospital is also known for the story of the bats who never left their chief.

== Background and History ==
The hospital was originally established in 1941 by a British military officer, General George Giffard, as a military hospital to provide treatment for troops injured in the Second World War. At the same time, Giffard also arranged the creation of the 52 Military Hospital at Takoradi, although this was later relocated to India. The hospital's name at this time was No. 37 General Hospital; it was changed to 37 Military Hospital of the Gold Coast in 1956. The hospital was later expanded and opened to the public, although the hospital continues to be staffed primarily by military personnel. In 2011, during a national strike by doctors in public hospitals, the Ministry of Health donated GH ¢230,000 of medical supplies to the hospital to enable it to continue treating an increased number of patients. During this 19-day strike, the number of patients admitted to the hospital doubled.

In the aftermath of the 2015 Accra explosion amid the 2015 Accra floods, so many bodies were taken to the hospital that the morgue was overwhelmed. The explosion killed over 150 people.

=== Bat colony ===
The area near 37 military hospital is home to a colony of straw-coloured fruit bats. According to local legend, the colony was established after the bats accompanied a village chief from eastern Ghana who came to the hospital for treatment. After his death, the bats never left the area.

== Facilities ==
In total, the hospital has around 500 beds. It has a 24-hour accident and emergency department and pharmacy. Its x-ray facilities are also available 24 hours a day. Other departments include divisions for dental treatment, gynecology, pediatrics and veterinary treatment. Its trauma department has been described by one travel guide as "the best in Accra".

The hospital is also used as a teaching hospital for post-graduate medical students.

The hospital was established on July 4, 1941, as the 37th facility by the allied forces in the then Gold Coast. From 1991 till today the German company Hospital Engineering GmbH had significant participation in the phased development of the 37 Military Hospital and is responsible for the maintenance of the equipment:

- Medical Oxygen Production and Distribution (1991/1992)
- Operating Theatre Block, including Central Sterilisation Department (1992/1993)
- Mortuary and Department of Morbid Anatomy (1995)
- Pharmacy (1998-2001)
- Laboratories, including Blood Bank (1998-2001)
- Functional Diagnostics Department (1998-2001)
- Burns Unit (1998-2001)
- Intensive Care Unit (1998-2001)
- VIP/Officers Ward (1998-2001)
- Rank Wards (1998-2001)
- Satellite Maternity Unit (1998-2001)
- Out-Patient-Department Planning Design, Architectural Drawings, Turnkey Construction (2004)

The departments at the hospital include:

- Shopping Mall
- Accident & Emergency
- Dental Division
- Public Health Division
- Medical Division
- Medical Reception Stations
- Obstetrics & Gynaecology
- Paediatric Division
- Pathology Division
- Pharmacy Division
- Radio Diagnosis, Radiography & X-ray
- Surgical Division
- Veterinary Division
- Health Training School (Medical Education)
- Renal Dialysis Unit
- Ophthalmology Division
- Ear, Nose, and Throat Division

== Emergency ==
The hospital helped in the fight of the novel Coronavirus.
