= Mepe, Ghana =

Coordinates: 6°05′N 0°26′E

Mepe
- Interactive map of Mepe
- Country: Ghana
- Region: Volta Region

Mepe is a town in the North Tongu District of the Volta Region of Ghana, located near the Volta River and identified as one of the communities most affected by the 2023 Akosombo Dam spillage. Residents experienced extensive flooding when excess water was released from the Akosombo and Kpong dams, and the National Disaster Management Organisation later described Mepe as the hardest-hit community as floodwaters gradually receded by more than three feet.The controlled spillage caused widespread damage to homes, farms, and local livelihoods along the Lower Volta Basin and displaced tens of thousands of people across multiple districts, with Mepe and other parts of North Tongu hosting large numbers of internally displaced persons in temporary shelters. The town is known for the St. Kizito Secondary Technical School(French: Technique secondaire Saint Kizito). The school is a second-cycle institution. The people of Mepe celebrate the Afenorto Festival. As of 2023, Togbe Kwasi Nego VI was the Mankralo of the Mepe Traditional Area. As of 2023, Mamaga Adzo Sreku IV was the Paramount Queen Mother of the Mepe Traditional Area.

== Economy ==
Mepe forms part of the largely agrarian North Tongu District, where most residents engage in crop farming, livestock rearing, fishing and petty trading. The district has identified major crops such as rice, cassava, maize, mango, cashew, sweet potatoes, yam, cowpea, groundnuts and various vegetables as key to local livelihoods, with communities along the Volta River including Mepe-having additional potential for aquaculture and river-based tourism. Oyster shells found in Mepe and neighbouring areas are an important local mineral resource, used in activities such as painting and as an ingredient in animal feed.

== 2023 Akosombo Dam Spillage ==
Mepe was the community most severely affected by the 2023 Akosombo Dam spillage, one of 177 communities across North Tongu, Central Tongu, South Tongu, Shai Osudoku, Asuogyaman, Anloga, Ada East and Lower Manya districts impacted by controlled flood releases from the Volta River Authority.

The Volta River Authority began releasing water from the Akosombo and Kpong dams in September 2023 after heavy rainfall pushed reservoir levels close to the dam's operational limit, and the resulting downstream flooding ultimately displaced more than 31,000 people across North and Central Tongu districts.

In Mepe, the flooding cut off electricity and water supply, submerged homes, and forced hundreds of households from their properties; residents reported drinking directly from the river amid the loss of portable water.

Classrooms at Mepe Presbyterian School were converted into an emergency shelter, or "safe haven", for displaced residents, and the Ghana Navy carried out rescue operations in the town, part of a broader effort in which the Navy rescued more than 8,000 people from the Akosombo and Kpong Dam spillage areas by mid-October 2023.

== Education and Local Development ==
Mepe hosts a Technical Vocational Education and Training (TVET) centre located in the Dadome-Fakpoe area, established through community-led initiatives. The facility was created to equip young people in the town with practical skills for employment and development. Its completion was supported by emeritus Professor E.H.K. Akaho, a nuclear scientist and former Director-General of the Ghana Atomic Energy Commission, who is a native of Mepe.

== Festival ==
The chiefs and people of Mepe celebrate the Apenorto Festival, which literally means a "period of rest at home" and serves as the main traditional festival of the Mepe Traditional area. It begins towards the end of July and culminates in a grand durbar of chiefs on the second Saturday of August, with drumming, dancing, musketry, storytelling and processions involving the five principal clans of Mepe. In recent years, the festival has been held under themes that emphasise post-Akosombo Dam flood recovery, unity and sustainable development, reflecting the community's efforts to rebuild and strengthen social cohesion.

== See also ==
- Akosombo Dam Spillage
- Apenorto Festival
