= 2015 Accra floods =

2015 disaster in Accra, Ghana

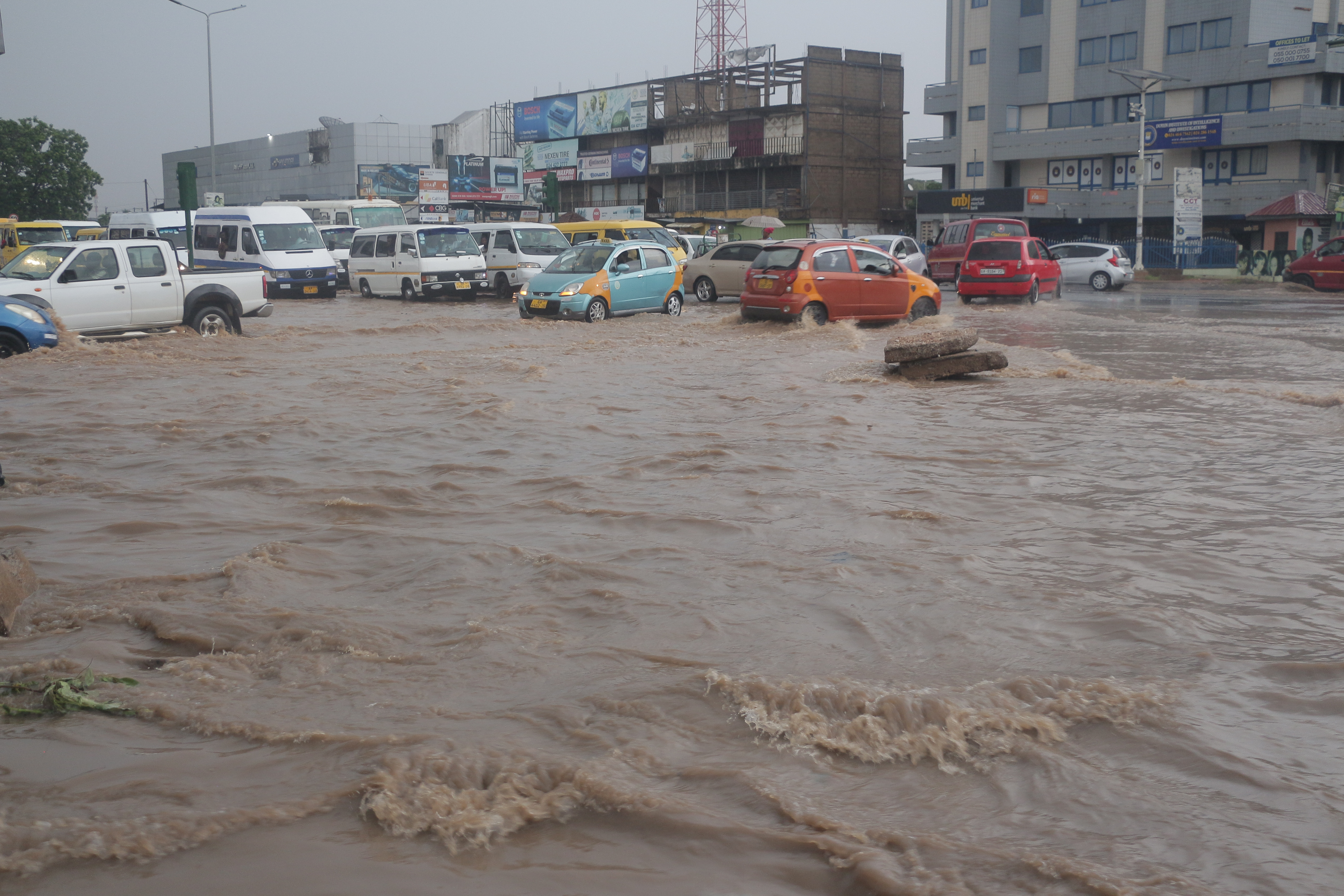
Most part of Accra mostly flooded during rainy season causing environmental crisis in Ghana

The 2015 Accra floods resulted from heavy continuous rainfall in Accra, the largest city in Ghana. The rain started on 1 June 2015. Other causes of this flood is as a result of the improper planning of settlement in Accra, choked gutters which block the drainage system and a few other human factors. The floods have resulted in heavy traffic on the roads in the city and also a halt in commercial activities as markets were flooded and workers trapped. Mayor of Accra Metropolitan Assembly, Alfred Oko Vanderpuije described the flooding as critical. At least 25 people have died from the flooding directly, while a petrol station explosion caused by the flooding killed at least 200 more people.

== Affected areas ==
=== Kaneshie ===
The Kaneshie market and its surroundings were submerged, preventing vehicles from moving.

=== Graphic Road ===
Graphic Road, home to some automobile companies and a hub for scrap dealers and other squatters, was heavily flooded. The Toyota Ghana and Rana Motors showrooms were completely submerged.

=== GOIL fire ===
On June 3, 2015, a GOIL fuel station near Kwame Nkrumah Interchange burnt with people and vehicles in the vicinity. The fire also burnt a Forex Bureau and Pharmacy nearby. Over 200 people were feared dead and bodies have been moved to the 37 Military Hospital. The hospital later announced they are unable to hold more bodies. The cause of the fire was yet to be determined. On 4 June 2015 the Mayor of Accra Alfred Vanderpuije, Member of Parliament for Korle Klottey, Nii Armah Ashitey and President John Mahama visited the scene.

== Response ==
- (Ghana) — President Mahama declared 3 days' national mourning for the victims affected by the flood and explosion. The government also released GH₵ 60 million to support victims.

== See also ==
- Floods in Ghana
- 2016 Accra floods
