= Mallam, Ghana =

Mallam is a town in the Greater Accra Region of Ghana. It is located on the main Kaneshie - Winneba Highway, a peri-urban town in the Weija-Gbawe Municipal Assembly of the Greater Accra region of Ghana. The town, in recent years, has seen a lot of slow but steady developments under different governments in the country. Mallam experiences a five-month dry season lasting from November through March. During the dry season, the northeast trade winds are prominent. The dry season is followed by a seven-month rainy season that lasts from April through October. During this rainy season, the southwest monsoon winds are most common. The rainy season is usually characterized by flooding, low crop yield, and financial strain on the locals of the area.

== Population ==
=== Ethnic groups ===
The early settlers of Mallam were mainly Gas before they drifted to other parts like Gbawe and Gonsei which are now predominantly inhabited by Gas. The immediate entry into Mallam is inhabited by Hausas who have made that area their dwelling, building a mosque (masalachi), a place of worship, homes, schools, and other recreational facilities, and business to help them stay there. As the town grew, other tribes such as the Akan, Ewe, and Guan found a home there. Languages spoken differ across different regions of the country. Ga, Akan, Haute, and Ewe are the most commonly spoken languages. Mallam is traditionally home to the Ga tribes. Today, it is home to other ethnic groups such as Gas, Akans, Ewes, Walas/Dagartis, Mostries, Basares and other smaller tribes.

=== Population growth ===
As of 2010, Mallam's population was estimated to be 25,841 people. Ghana has experienced rapid population growth in the past three decades. The population growth directly affects Malam, and other peri-urban areas. In 1970, Mallam had a population of 463. In 1984 the population was 1,597. In 2000 the population was 15,841. In 2010 the population grew to 25,841. Doing a comparative analysis of population changes and increase it's clear that the town is witnessing an increase in its human resources time and time as the years go by. The population growth of Mallam and its repercussions can be attributed to Rural-Urban migration due to inadequate economic opportunities in rural Ghana and migration to Accra has become the norm for most of the settlers there. It is no surprise that the increase in population has come with some challenges, such as indiscriminate dumping of refuse and sewage, unplanned and haphazard building units, traffic congestion, poor road linkages, water inaccessibility among others, becoming a major issue that the institutions and the individuals of Mallam are battling to solve on a daily basis. Furthermore, as a result of the continual increase in Mallam's population, there is an increasing demand for residential land to accommodate the quickly growing population. Despite these challenges, Mallam has seen an increase in economic activity, with many businnesses setting up in the area.

== Politics ==
On December 17, 2019, the Electoral Commission of Ghana organized District Assembly elections at the local levels to elect persons into District offices (Assembly man, Unit Committee members) to administer governance, growth and development. The Mallam electoral area is one of the many areas where the elections were held. The area is divided into two Electoral areas, Mallam East and West, with Mr Martin Agyei being overwhelming elected as the Assembly man for Mallam East while Mr Nyametease was elected as the Assembly man of Mallam West Electoral area. The area is booming to lots of businesses on either side of the divide handled by private and government orientation. The area has lots of Churches, Schools, Businesses, Commercial Hubs, Police Posts, Clinics and other amenities to boost standard of living.
