= Solidarités international =

Solidarités International
- Founded: 1980
- Type: Non-governmental organization (NGO)
- Purpose: Emergency action, Water, Sanitation and Hygiene, Food Security
- Headquarters: Clichy, Hauts-de-Seine, France
- Region served: Worldwide
- Employees: 2 350
- Website: solidarites.org/en

Solidarités International is a non-profit organization working in areas of conflict and natural disasters. Its main aim is to provide quick and effective support for people in life-threatening situations by meeting their vital needs: water, food and shelter. The organization also has a particular focus on unsafe drinking water and food insecurity among the most vulnerable populations. Solidarités International, an organization founded in 1980 by Alain Boinet under France's 1901 charity law, comprises 2 350 national and international employees (2020 figures). Each year it carries out over 120 humanitarian programs in 20 countries.

== Origin of Solidarités International ==
Solidarités International's humanitarian action dates back to 1979 and the war in Afghanistan. Five French citizens, including Patrice Franceschi, Alain Boinet and Patrick Brizay, launched the “caravans of hope” to provide aid for the local inhabitants. With the help of the Afghan resistance, they crossed the border in secret and delivered much-needed humanitarian aid to the population throughout the country. This was the first mission by Solidarités International.

== Action and expertise ==
Solidarités International's mission is to go further in terms of humanitarian aid. The aim of the organization is not only to respond to the vital needs of populations faced with humanitarian crises resulting from armed conflicts or natural disasters but also to support the survivors on the road to autonomy and growth, especially in the areas of water, hygiene, sanitation and food security.

=== Emergency Action ===
During a conflict or following a natural disaster, Solidarités International intervenes by responding to the basic needs of water, food and shelter. The emergency response follows a three-stage action plan:

- Diagnosis of the emergency: a team of experts makes a detailed on-the-spot diagnosis to evaluate the size of the disaster and the needs of the populations affected. The diagnosis report then enables the most appropriate humanitarian response to be prepared.
- Response to the most urgent needs: the public is informed of the situation and donors are sought. Funds collected enable an intervention team and logistical resources to be sent into the field. Once on site the humanitarian team works with the local populations. Intervention includes the treatment and distribution of water, establishment of sanitation systems, distribution of hygiene kits, basic necessities, food and the means and support to establish temporary shelters.
- Exit strategy: beyond the response to urgent needs, Solidarités International is committed to strengthening the resilience capacities of the affected communities. The humanitarian teams establish conditions for gradual disengagement, enabling, where possible, community takeover of emergency activities or their replacement through the introduction or reintroduction of sustainable services. Thus, with a view to going beyond a simple humanitarian response, the actions carried out in the field are designed to be sustainable, collaborative and forward-looking. The necessary knowledge and tools are passed on to the affected populations so they are able to rebuild their lives.

=== Water, Sanitation and Hygiene ===
Solidarités International works in the field with those populations most vulnerable to waterborne diseases. It intervenes to limit the propagation of these diseases.

Its actions aim to:

- Improve access to drinking water: distribution of drinking water, installation of wells, boreholes, catchment and protection of springs, drinking water supply networks.
- Improve sanitation: installation of toilet facilities, management of excreta and refuse and combating vectors of disease.
- Promote good hygiene practices.
- Support communities in the management of infrastructures: development of infrastructures in urban areas and protection of resources in rural areas.
- Support communities to maintain their awareness-raising activities.

=== Food Security ===
Solidarités International's action aims to respond to the most urgent food needs and to sustainably reinforce the livelihoods of the populations.

- In an emergency and depending on the context, the organization prioritizes money transfer, cash distribution and market-value coupon programs. These are exchanged for food or basic necessities with local businesses, which has the effect of stimulating the local economy. As a last resort, the organization implements direct food distribution programs.
- Alongside the emergency response, the organization intervenes to revive the livelihoods of the populations: distribution of agricultural inputs and livestock, money transfer programs, support for micro-enterprises and reconstruction of housing, access to essential services (vaccines and veterinary products for example).

In addition, Solidarités International's programs aim to increase yields and incomes from family farms by setting up public education projects, specific training programs, help with investment, activities to support producer groups, etc.

== Values ==
Solidarités International respects the principles as defined in its charter:

- Independence
- Non-discrimination and responses adapted to the situations of the assisted populations
- Action in response to request from the affected populations or their representatives
- Respect for the cultural identity and dignity of the individual
- Tangible application of projects
- Coordination and cooperation with the organizations and institutions involved
- Information and public awareness

== Missions ==
In 2022, Solidarités International intervenes in 24 countries by supporting more than 5 million people with their vital needs (2020 figures)

Africa

Mali, Burkina Faso, Nigeria, Niger, Central African Republic, Democratic Republic of the Congo, South Sudan, Sudan, Chad, Cameroon.

Asia

Afghanistan, Bangladesh, Myanmar

Caribbean

Haiti

Middle East

Lebanon, Syria, Yemen, Iraq

Europe

France, Ukraine, Moldova

South America

Colombia, Venezuela

== Campaigns ==
In 2005, Solidarités International began to prioritize action in water and sanitation. Since then Solidarités International has initiated numerous flagship campaigns designed to raise awareness among the general public on worldwide water issues. Following “L’eau qui tue” (“Deadly Water”) in 2006, the “Votre Goutte d’Eau“ (“Your Drop of Water”) campaign launched in 2007 aimed to shed light on the devastation caused by unsafe drinking water as well as to mobilize the public through a petition. This campaign has been organized each year for World Water Day and was also part of the 2012 World Water Forum, a decisive stage in the organization's struggle. For the 2010 World Water Day, the organization created a “wall of water” for the public in front of the Louvre in Paris which delivered messages to passers-by with spotlights shining on jets of water.

The organization also publishes the Water, Sanitation and Hygien Barometer which takes stock of the current state of access to this vital resource.

== Funding ==
Solidarités International receives funding from European and international donors, businesses and the general public. 93% of funds are assigned to humanitarian missions in the field (2020 figures). This figure reflects the organization's strategic commitment to the principle of action. The organization's accounts are certified by an auditor. As well as this internal monitoring, 95% of missions are subject to an external audit.

== See also ==
- drinking water
- WASH
- waterborne diseases
- cholera
- food security
