= 1983 famine in Ghana =

Humanitarian crisis in Ghana

- Date: 1982-1984; declared 19 October 1983
- Location: Ghana countrywide
- Deaths: Hundreds, mainly children
- Injuries: 1.5 million accounts for 12% of the total population
- Property damage: Severe crop losses from drought and fires led to food scarcity, rising prices, and more cases of malnutrition.

== Background and Details of the Disaster ==
Ghana physical map

The 1983 famine in Ghana, one of the most severe crises in the nation's history, stemmed from a confluence of drought, economic difficulties, and political turmoil. In the early 1980s, Ghana endured a significant drought that severely diminished crop production, constraining food supplies and resulting in widespread malnutrition and hunger. This drought spell coincided with the nation's most devastating bushfires, which obliterated extensive areas of cropland. The fires, intensified by the drought, caused substantial losses in crops and livestock, leading families into severe food crisis.

Alongside environmental reasons, Ghana encountered economic difficulties, such as elevated inflation, diminished agricultural production, and increasing unemployment. The problem was exacerbated by the repatriation of over one million Ghanaians expelled from Nigeria in 1983, who returned to discover already limited food resources. The cumulative demands stretched the nation's food supply networks, leaving millions unable to satisfy their fundamental nutritional requirements. As hunger intensified, the government pursued foreign assistance, and the world community offered aid. The famine emphasised the weaknesses in Ghana's agricultural and economic sectors, revealing the necessity for structural reforms to avert future disasters

Ghana, administrative divisions

== Factors and impacts ==
Ghana is located between 4.5° and 11.5° N latitude and 3.5° W and 1.3° E longitude and covers the typical agro-ecological zones of West Africa. Administratively, Ghana is divided into 16 regions, which are divided into 170 sub-regions spread across six agro-ecological zones. The average annual rainfall in the country ranges between 800 and 2400 millimeters, with rainfall decreasing and aridity increasing from south to north. Ghana's agricultural economy is heavily dependent on rainfall and is therefore highly affected by drought. The mainstay of Ghana's economy is agriculture, which is highly dependent on rainfall and is therefore particularly affected by drought events.

=== Natural and geographical factors contributing to famine ===
==== Climatic Factors ====
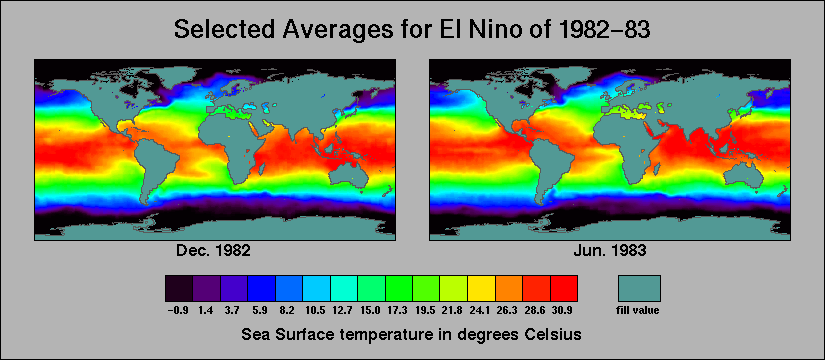

Rainfall in West Africa is known to change due to the influence of the Atlantic Ocean. According to research, the El Niño phenomenon is believed to be directly linked to droughts in the West African region. This view can be used to explain the exceptional droughts experienced in the region in the late 1970s and 1980s, as these drought events coincided with periods of high El Niño activity.

==== Decline in rainfall and intensity of drought ====
The decline in rainfall in Ghana reached critical levels in 1982-1983, with many regions receiving only 70-90% of average and dropping below 50% in 1983, leading to a sharp decline in food production. The drought was particularly severe in the coastal regions, where Accra received only 58% of normal rainfall, the second lowest rate ever recorded. In addition, several other areas have seen record lows in rainfall.

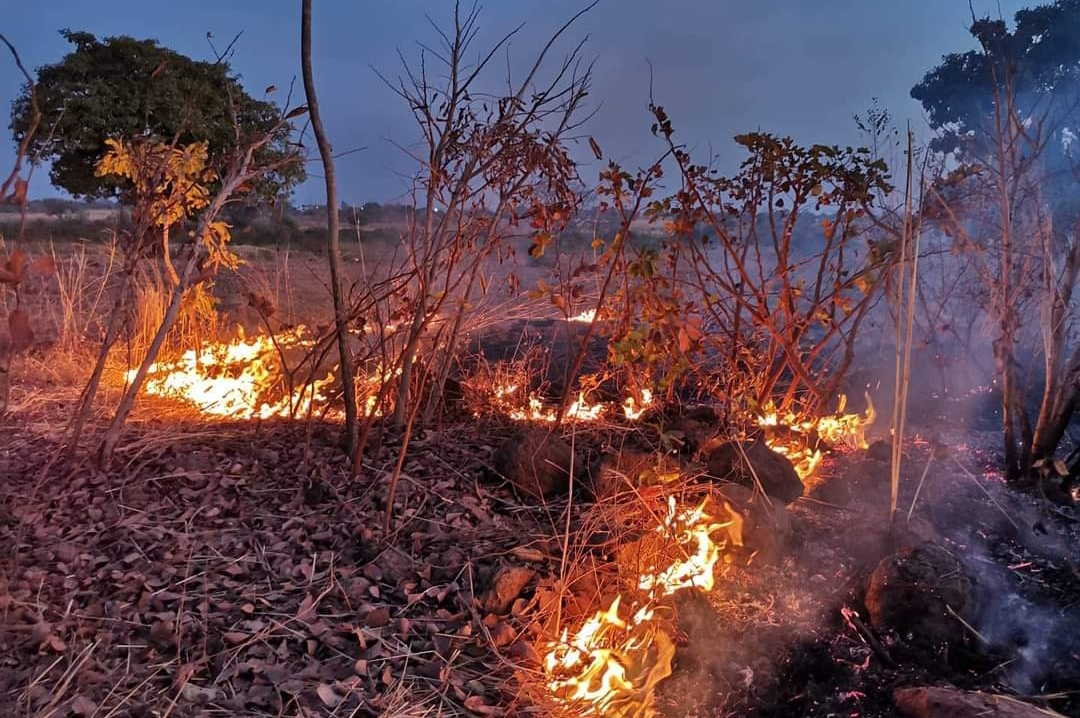
Bush Fires in Northern Ghana

==== Impact of wildfires ====
The year 1983 was one of the worst years for wildfires in Ghana's history. The Harmattan dry monsoon reduced humidity to less than 10%, exacerbating the drought and leading to the spread of large numbers of wildfires. These fires further damaged agricultural land and ecosystems. Northern Ghana has experienced prolonged and severe drought years during which bushfires have raged, destroying agricultural land, livestock, and other forms of life and property. The Ayirebi community reported that 59 hectares of farmland were burned between January and May 1983 alone.

==== Land degradation and deforestation ====
Deforestation is commonly practiced in Africa to increase the area of agricultural land. Ghanaian soils, especially in the Bongo region of the northeast, are stony and high in iron, resulting in poor soil water retention. This, coupled with overuse of land as well as deforestation, reduces soil fertility and decreases crop yields. In addition, poverty is high in the Upper East region, making it difficult for farmers to afford fertilizers to improve the soil. Prolonged farming and lack of land restoration measures are why the issue of land degradation became particularly acute in 1983.

=== Environmental and Social Impacts ===
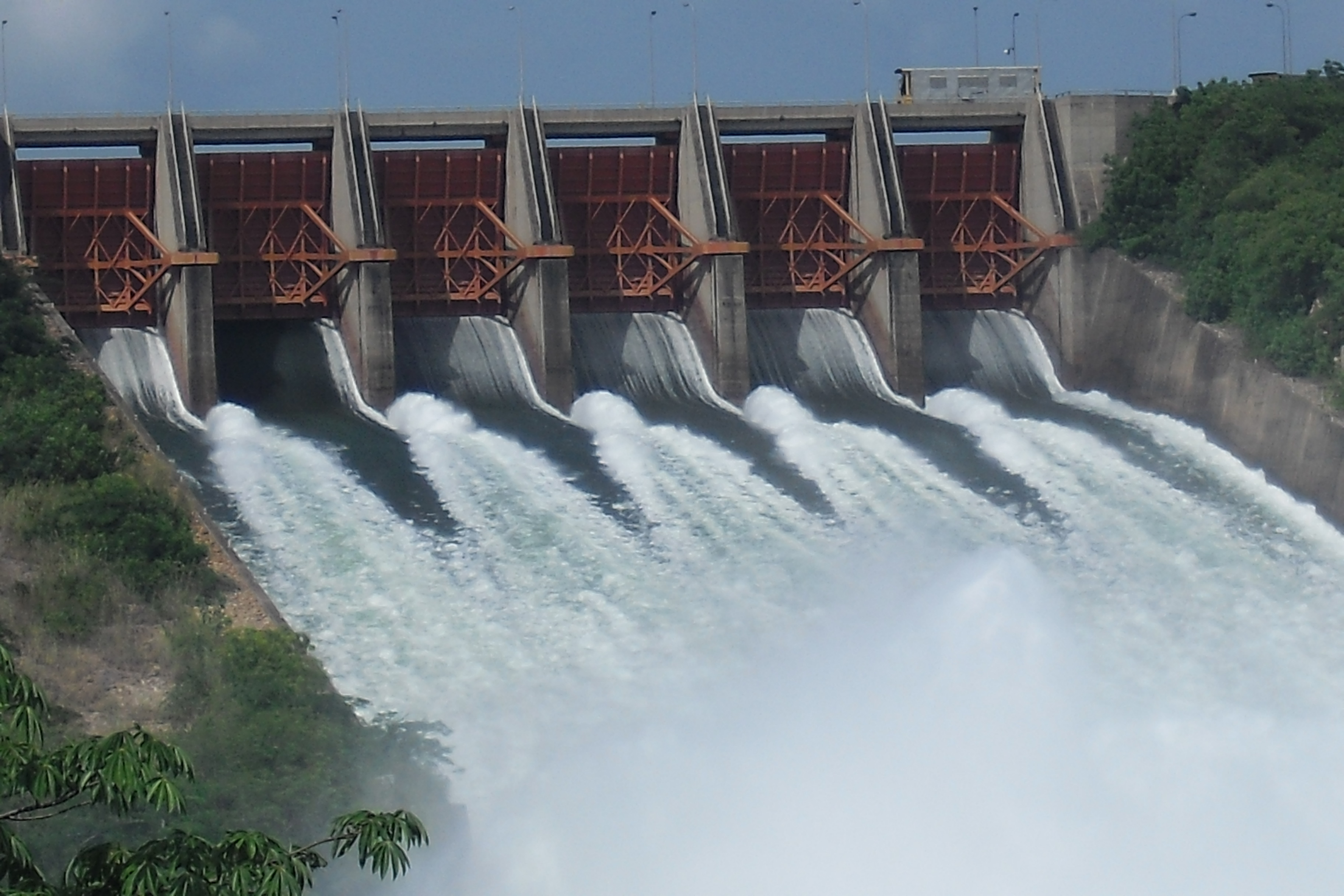
Akosombo Dam is spilling water, Ghana

==== Water scarcity ====
The water level of the Akosombo Dam has dropped below the minimum operating level which affected the availability of electricity in Ghana and its neighbouring countries, further diminishing the capacity for irrigated agriculture. The people of Ghana generally live in a state of hardship due to water scarcity as rivers and streams dry up, leaving many rural communities to travel long distances for water.

==== Immigration and Resource Pressure ====
In 1983, Nigerian President Shehu Shagari ordered the deportation of all illegal immigrants, including a large number of Ghanaians, in an effort to alleviate unemployment and economic pressures in the country. The Nigerian deportation resulted in the return of some 900,000 to 1.2 million Ghanaians, representing 10% of Ghana's total population at the time. The magnitude and severity of the 1983 famine in Ghana was exacerbated by the surge in food needs of returning migrants and the depletion of government resources, as well as the worsening of social tensions.

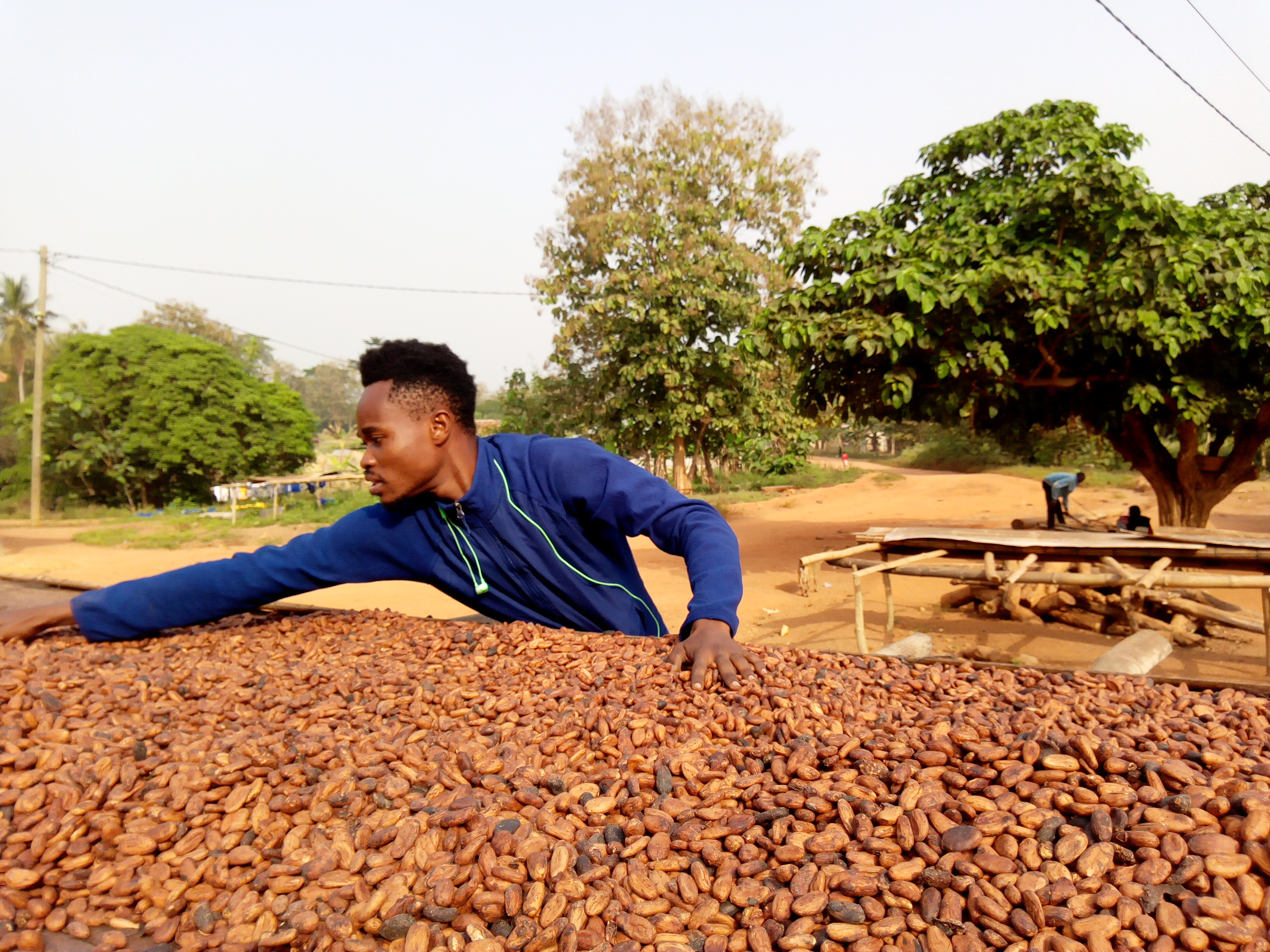
A cocoa farm in Ghana

==== Economic impact ====
Ghana's economy continued to deteriorate from the 1970s to the early 1980s, including high inflation, the prevalence of black markets, and severe shortages of basic commodities. Cocoa bean, Ghana's main agricultural export crop and occupies a unique position in the Ghanaian economy, had its production begin to plummet from the 1960s onwards, and nearly collapsed in the early 1980s after experiencing falling prices, political unrest, drought, and devastating forest fires. This economic crisis also had a significant impact on the famine in Ghana.

== Local and International Responses ==
=== Local Responses ===
Ghana has experienced significant food shortages and famines, particularly in the northern regions, due to a combination of climatic, economic, and political factors. Local responses to these crises have been multifaceted, encompassing community-based initiatives and government efforts. Traditional practices, such as food sharing and communal farming, have been crucial for immediate relief.

Additionally, local NGOs and community organizations have played a vital role in distributing food aid and providing support to vulnerable populations. These organizations often work closely with traditional leaders and community members to ensure that aid reaches those who need it most. The Ghanaian government has also implemented various relief programs, such as the Operation Feed Yourself (OFY) campaign in the 1970s, aimed at boosting local food production. This campaign encouraged self-reliance and local initiative in food production, which helped to alleviate some of the immediate pressures of food shortages. Infrastructure development, including the construction of roads and irrigation systems, has been prioritized to enhance agricultural productivity and reduce post-harvest losses. Economic policies, such as price controls and subsidies for fertilizers and seeds, have been employed to make food more affordable and to support small farmers.

=== International Responses ===
International responses to famine in Ghana have been equally multifaceted, involving humanitarian aid, technical assistance, and policy advice. International organizations like the United Nations World Food Programme (WFP) and non-governmental organizations (NGOs) have provided emergency food aid during severe shortages. These organizations have played a crucial role in delivering food to affected regions, often working in partnership with local authorities and community organizations to ensure effective distribution. Technical assistance has included agricultural training and collaborative research projects focused on developing drought-resistant crops and improving soil fertility. International experts have provided training to local farmers in modern agricultural techniques and best practices, helping to build capacity and resilience in the agricultural sector. Policy advice from international bodies has emphasized economic reforms to improve food security, such as liberalizing trade and reducing government intervention in the market. Support has also been provided to strengthen local institutions responsible for monitoring and responding to food crises such as the WFP has worked with the Ghanaian government to establish early warning systems and improve disaster preparedness.

=== Challenges and Limitations ===
Despite these efforts, significant challenges remain. Coordination issues, such as fragmented efforts and lack of integration between local and international initiatives, lead to inefficiencies and resource duplication. Political and economic constraints, including corruption and economic instability, have hindered the effective distribution of aid and resources. Environmental factors, such as persistent droughts and soil degradation, continue to pose challenges to agricultural productivity.

To effectively address food insecurity, a more integrated and sustainable approach is needed, combining local knowledge with international expertise and resources. This holistic strategy can ensure that both immediate relief and long-term development are achieved.

== Short-term and Long-term Health Consequences ==
The 1983 famine in Ghana, a crisis driven by severe drought, leading to a massive food supply deficit and a devastating decrease in nutritional consumption, affected the population both short-term and long-term.

=== Short-term health consequences ===
The immediate consequence of the famine was malnutrition, as caused by severe food shortages. During that time, about 40% of their food supply were destroyed. Around 1.5 million suffered from malnutrition, anaemia and kwashiorkor, particularly among children. According to reports from 1986 and 1989, children who were affected by the drought had lower weight for their age-group.

Water has also been a problem, as the amount of rainfall dropped, leading to a decrease in supply for household use and consumption, which consequently lead to an increase in water-borne diseases.

The famine also affected essential services- schools were closed, and hospitals refused to admit patients if their family could not provide them with food.

There are no records on the effect of the famine on psychosocial health of the Ghanaians in 1983. However, based on a systematic review of seven relatively recent studies (2012-2020), of which six were from Ghana- exposure to famine is associated with increased mental health problems.

Mortality rates from the 1983 famine in Ghana are not available; however, estimates from the World Bank between 1960 and 2022 reported the highest under-five mortality in 1984, at 90,497 deaths.

=== Long-term health consequences ===
The effect of the famine still persists, long after it started. However, only few articles have explored its long term effects.

Early exposure to malnutrition, especially on the first 2 years of life, has negative impact on learning. Those who were around 0–2 years old during the height of the famine are noted to perform poorer on cognitive achievement tests. However, while these data have been controlled for multiple factors, some confounding factors, like physical and mental health, have not been accounted for which might have affected the results.

Exposure to famine also affect the physical characteristics of the victims. Stunting rates were high among children immediately after the height of the famine. This effect was thought to persist in the long term, as it was noted from the Ghana Demographic and Health Survey (DHS) in 2003, that women born during the peak of the famine are more than likely to be abnormally short. These data are based on calculations from 2 different time points, and that no data were collected specific to those affected of the 1983 famine.

A similar study proposed that this effect in anthropometric measurements is intergenerational. It was noted that children born of mothers who survived the famine have lower weight and height. Using the data from Ghana’s DHS conducted in 2014, 2016, and 2019, it was found out that children of women born during the famine period, have lower weight and height compared to children whose mothers were born after. Similar to the previous study, these findings are based on calculations. Also, the authors have acknowledged that they were unable to control for all factors that could influence child health. In summary, deeper analysis and a more rigorous study need to be done before conclusions can be drawn.

== Lessons Emerged from this Disaster ==
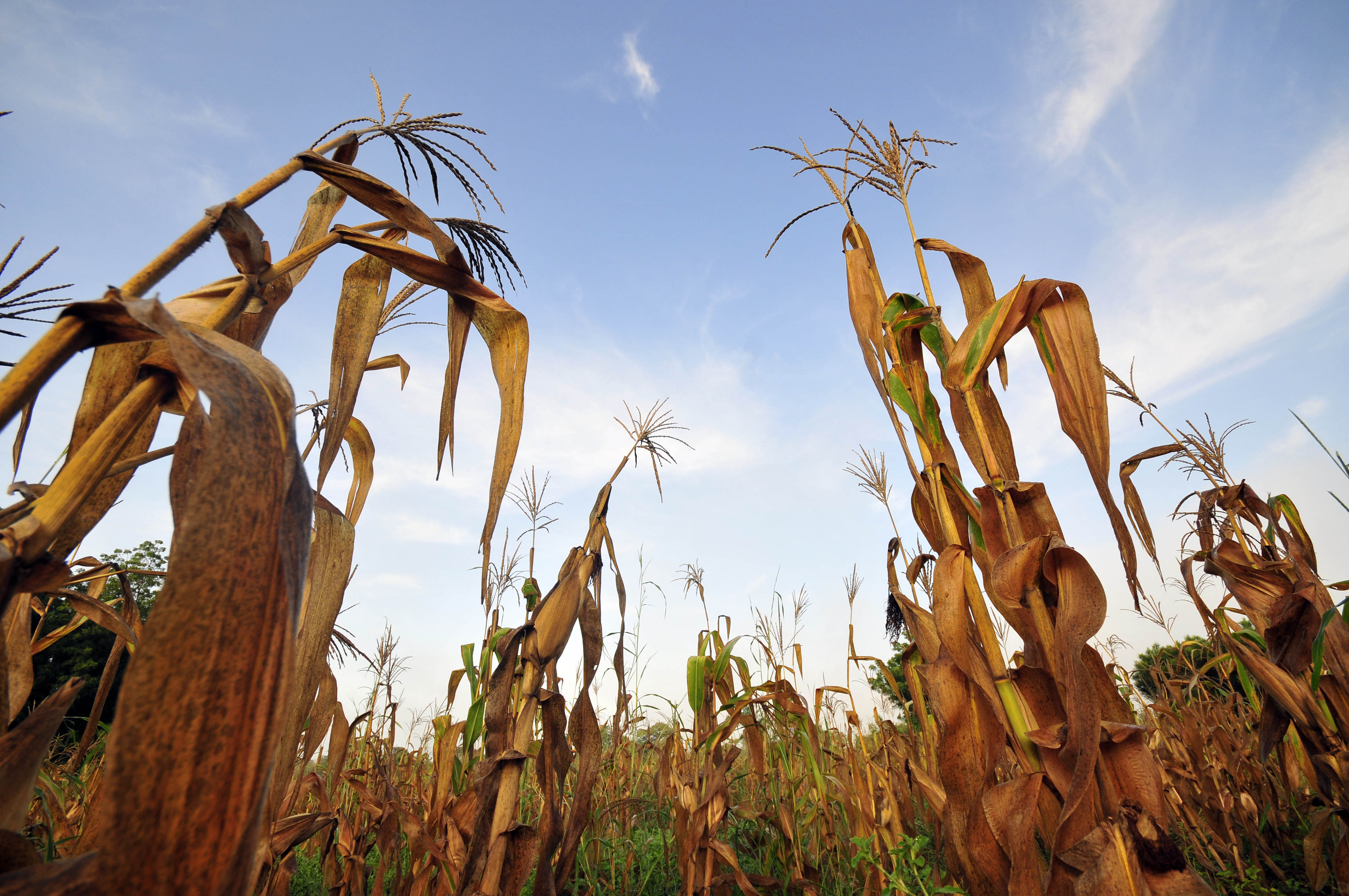
Failed maize crops in Ghana's Upper West Region

The 1983 famine in Ghana brought to light several key lessons that have since informed policies on disaster preparedness, food security, and resilience in Ghana and across similar nations.

=== Significance of Diversified Agriculture ===
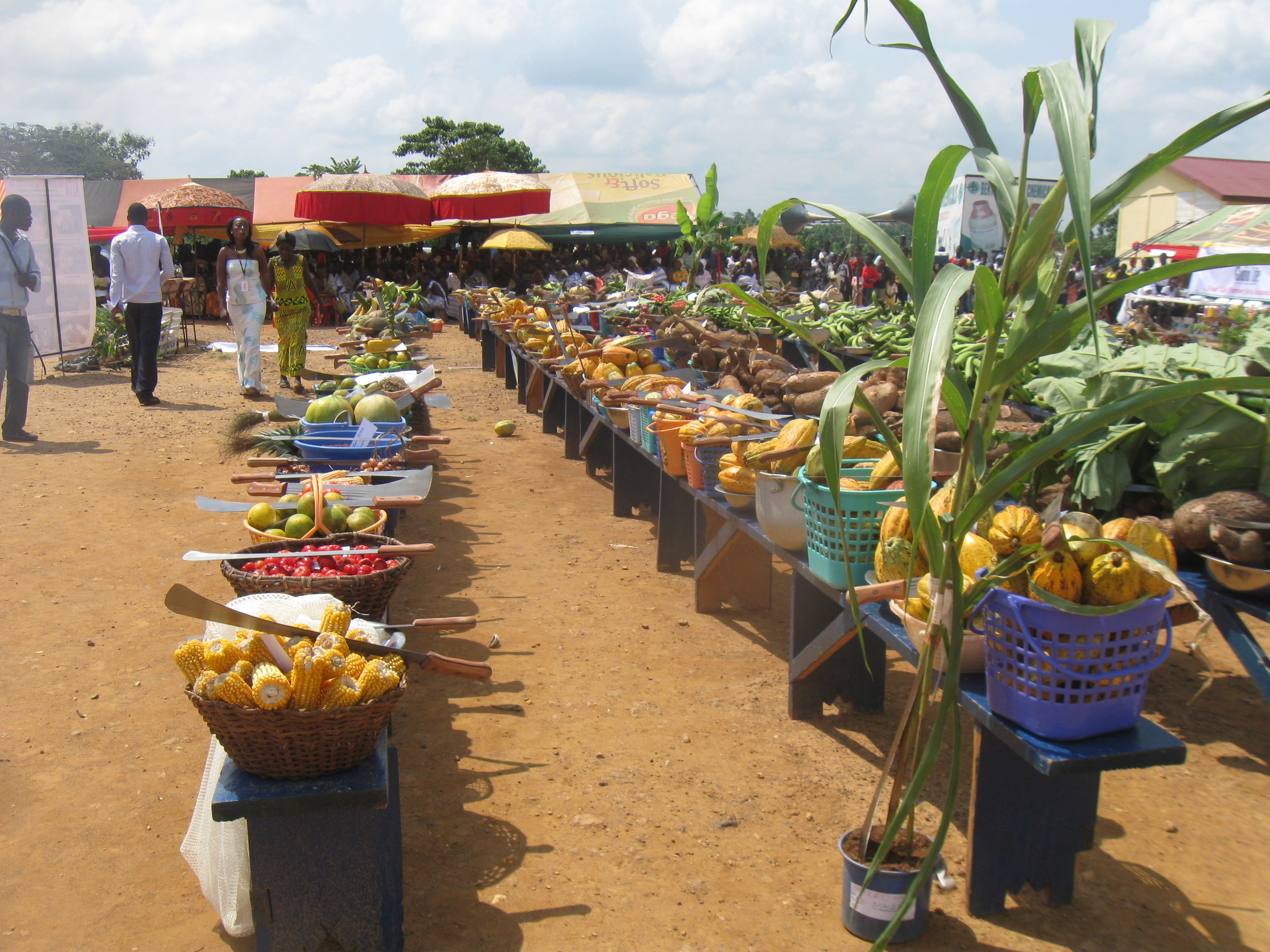
2010 FarmersDay AshantiRegion Ghana

A crucial lesson from the 1983 famine was the necessity for diversified agricultural techniques. Ghana's dependence on a narrow range of primary crops, such as maize and cassava, rendered it exceedingly susceptible to climatic fluctuations and droughts. Since that time, there has been an initiative to diversify crops and advocate for drought-resistant varieties capable of enduring severe environmental conditions. This strategy seeks to safeguard food supply from severe weather occurrences, hence diminishing the probability of food shortages. Crop diversification efforts in West Africa have shown promise in reducing food insecurity and environmental vulnerability.

=== Resilience through Sustainable Farming Practices ===
The crisis showed the necessity for sustainable agricultural practices that preserve soil fertility and protect water resources. In later decades, practices such as crop rotation, intercropping, and agroforestry have been advocated to enhance soil health and water retention, which are critical under drought conditions. These approaches enhance overall ecosystem health, reducing the likelihood of future agricultural crises stemming from environmental degradation.

=== Investment in Food Storage and Distribution Infrastructure ===
The famine was intensified by inadequate infrastructure for the effective storage and distribution of food. Crops were vulnerable to rotting, and the absence of dependable distribution channels impeded relief operations. Consequently, Ghana has invested in grain silos, storage facilities, and transportation networks to guarantee the preservation and distribution of food amid unfavourable conditions.

=== Early Warning Systems and Data Collection ===
The famine underscored the necessity for early warning systems to detect and alleviate food shortages before they develop into critical crises. Ghana has established mechanisms to monitor precipitation patterns, agricultural health, and food prices, which act as indicators of possible food insecurity.

=== Significance of International Assistance and Policy Reform ===
The famine illustrated the significance of international assistance in addressing large-scale disasters, as Ghana obtained considerable food aid from foreign governments and international organisations. Nonetheless, dependence on external assistance has been critically examined, leading to demands for policy reforms that prioritise indigenous strategies for food security. Policy changes have encompassed support for local farmers, subsidies for vital crops, and initiatives designed to improve agricultural output, all of which contribute to strengthening internal resilience.

=== Population Management and Social Support Systems ===
The famine illustrated the strain that rapid demographic changes may place on resources, particularly as Ghana faced the unforeseen repatriation of one million citizens during the crisis. This experience has highlighted the significance of population control strategies and social support systems capable of accommodating abrupt demographic changes. Investments in social safety nets, including food assistance programs and healthcare services, save vulnerable populations during crises, thereby diminishing the probability of extensive suffering.
