= 2025 Africa floods =

Series of natural disasters in Africa

Map of Africa

Throughout 2025 floods affected most of Africa, killing hundreds of people.

In South Africa, most severe flood occurred in June 2025 when a powerful cold front brought torrential rain, heavy winds, and snow to the Eastern Cape province, leading to widespread flooding. At least 103 people died, and thousands were left homeless. The floods damaged over 127 schools and 20 healthcare facilities, and submerged homes, vehicles, and infrastructure in areas like Mthatha.

== Background ==
Floods occurred throughout 2025 in Africa due to heavy rainfall, snow, and dam collapses.

== Impact ==
=== Botswana ===
In February 2025 flooding occurred in Gaborone, Botswana, caused by record rainfall, killing at least 9 people. As many as 1,800 people were evacuated, and over 5,000 people were affected by the floods.

=== Nigeria ===
In late May 2025, flooding occurred in Mokwa after the collapse of a nearby dam which was caused by heavy rainfall, killing more than 200 people, leaving over 500 missing, injuring 121 others and affecting thousands, including at least 3,018 displaced.

=== South Africa ===
In June 2025, floods caused by torrential rains, snow, and heavy winds left at least 92 dead and 2,686 residents homeless. Primary areas affected included Eastern Cape province and, in particular, Mthatha.
