= June 2025 South Africa floods =

Flooding in Eastern Cape, South Africa

2025 South Africa floods
- Location: South Africa
- Cause: Torrential rain, heavy winds, snow
- Deaths: 103
- Property damage: Homes, vehicles, schools, health care facilities, buses

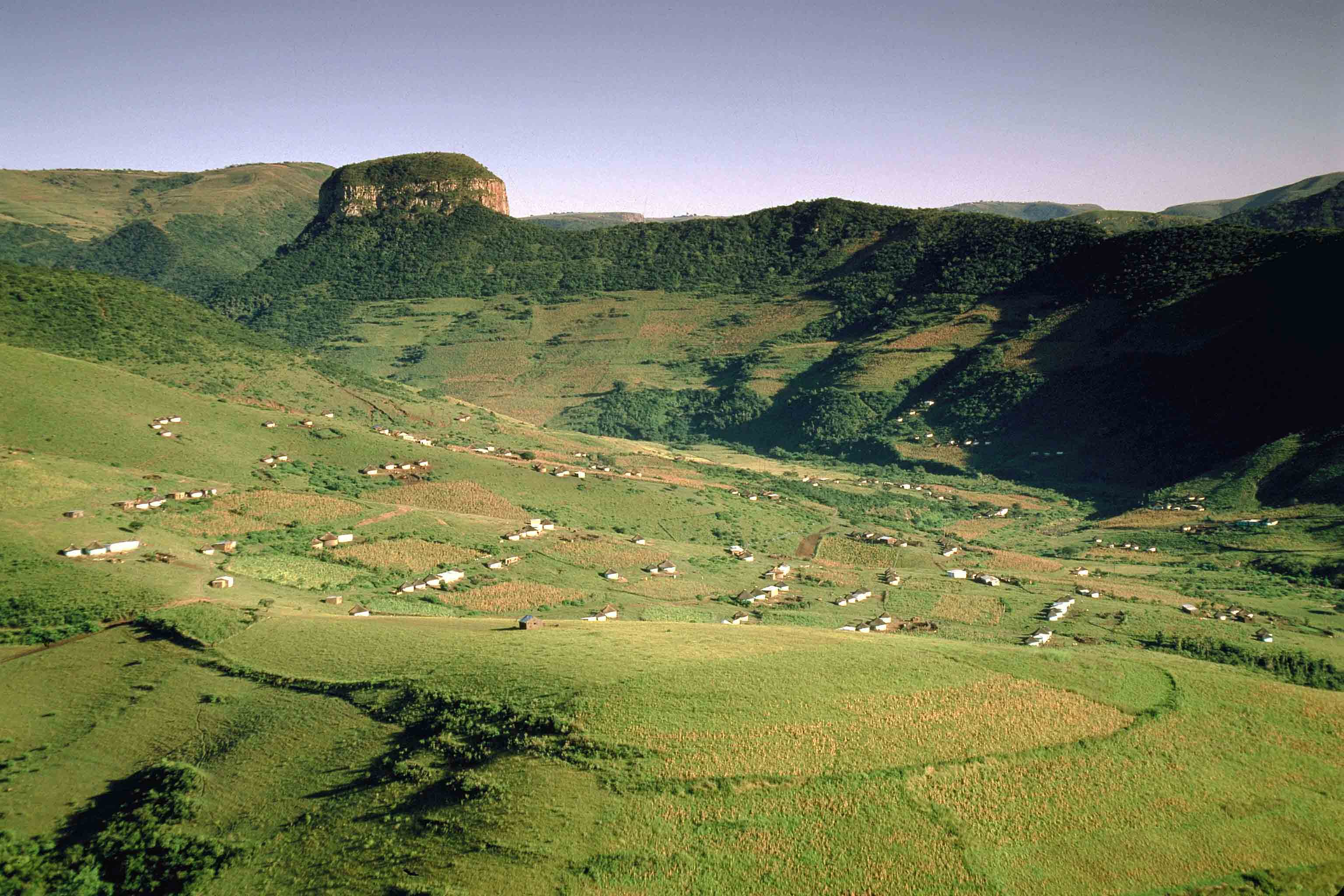
Mthatha - South Africa

The June 2025 South Africa floods were caused by torrential rain, heavy winds, and snow that swept through Cape Town, South Africa, causing dozens of deaths and displacing thousands. A powerful cold front had swept through Cape Town and neighboring provinces beginning 10 June 2025. The storm caused rivers to burst their banks producing floodwaters of up to 3–4 metres (10–13 ft) deep around Mthatha, leading to homes, vehicles, buses, and individuals caught off guard to be swept away, People were stranded on rooftops and in trees awaiting rescue following the storms. The city (Mthatha) is near the village of Qunu, birthplace of Nelson Mandela, the late anti-apartheid hero and former president.

On 18 June, a national disaster was declared, one week after the floods began.

== Background ==
Warnings of dangerous weather—heavy rain, flooding, strong coastal waves, and snow—were issued several days in advance, though the scale of destruction surpassed expectations.

According to the Green Climate Fund, South Africa is highly vulnerable to the impact of climate variability and change, which increases the frequency and severity of extreme weather.

== Toll and impact ==
As of 12 June 2025, it was originally reported that at least 57 people had been confirmed dead, and dozens more were still missing. By 19 June, the death toll had risen to 92 according to The Washington Post. On 23 June, The Witness newspaper of South Africa reported that the death toll has increased to 98. On 30 June, the South African Government announced that 102 bodies had been recovered. The youngest child killed by the floods was 12 months old. Officials also stated that 2,686 residents had been left homeless. As of 4 July, the Eastern Cape Provincial Government said that the death toll sat at 103, consisting of 32 school-going children, 50 males and 53 females, 40 children and 63 adults. They also indicated that as of 4 July, 4,724 individuals were without homes with another 2 145 dwellings partially damaged.

On 27 June, Williams announced that repairs and reconstruction is expected to cost an estimated $288 million USD.

Oscar Mabuyane, the premier of Eastern Cape province, said that the floods began in the middle of the night, leaving many unaware of what was about to occur and that they should prepare.

Rescue efforts were hampered by limited resources available. Reportedly, only one helicopter was available locally, and there were no K9 units or specialist divers to assist with search efforts. On 13 June, a second helicopter joined the rescue effort.

Earlier estimates on 11 June reported that there were at least 40 deaths, but officials warned that the death toll could rise. Hundreds of thousands of homes had lost power, more than 127 schools and 20 health-care facilities were damaged, over one thousand people were displaced, and critical infrastructure (bridges, roads, etc.) was badly damaged. Thousands of houses, roads, schools and health facilities were left caked in mud after being completely submerged in floodwaters. Some of the victims were washed up to 2 kilometers (1.2 miles) away from their homes by the floods.

== Mthatha Dam theory ==
In the days following the floods, Mchunu advised locals of a theory being spread online that is inaccurate that the floods were caused by someone opening the sluice gates at the Mthatha Dam, causing water to surge into the communities. Mchunu dismissed the claims and said the dam in question did not have sluice gates.

== Incidents ==
=== High school bus crash ===
People Magazine reported on 11 June that on the prior day, a high school bus carrying 13 students and two adults was swept away near Mthatha, resulting in the deaths of six students and two adults, with four students still missing. Three students survived by clinging to trees. The incident alone accounted for a substantial portion of the fatalities.

== Response ==
=== Local ===
Many local people condemned chronic neglect of infrastructure in impoverished rural areas, stating that poor maintenance and underinvestment exacerbated the effect of the floods. Rescuers went door to door searching for bodies or possible survivors, after people became stuck inside their homes when the water rushed in during the night. Forensic Pathology Services along with Emergency Medical Services (EMS) and Gift of the Givers Foundation were part of the search party.

=== State ===
On 15 June, Provincial Government issued a statement confirming that water and electricity had been restored in various parts of OR Tambo District. They also confirmed the reopening of all major roads and that classes at local schools had resumed.

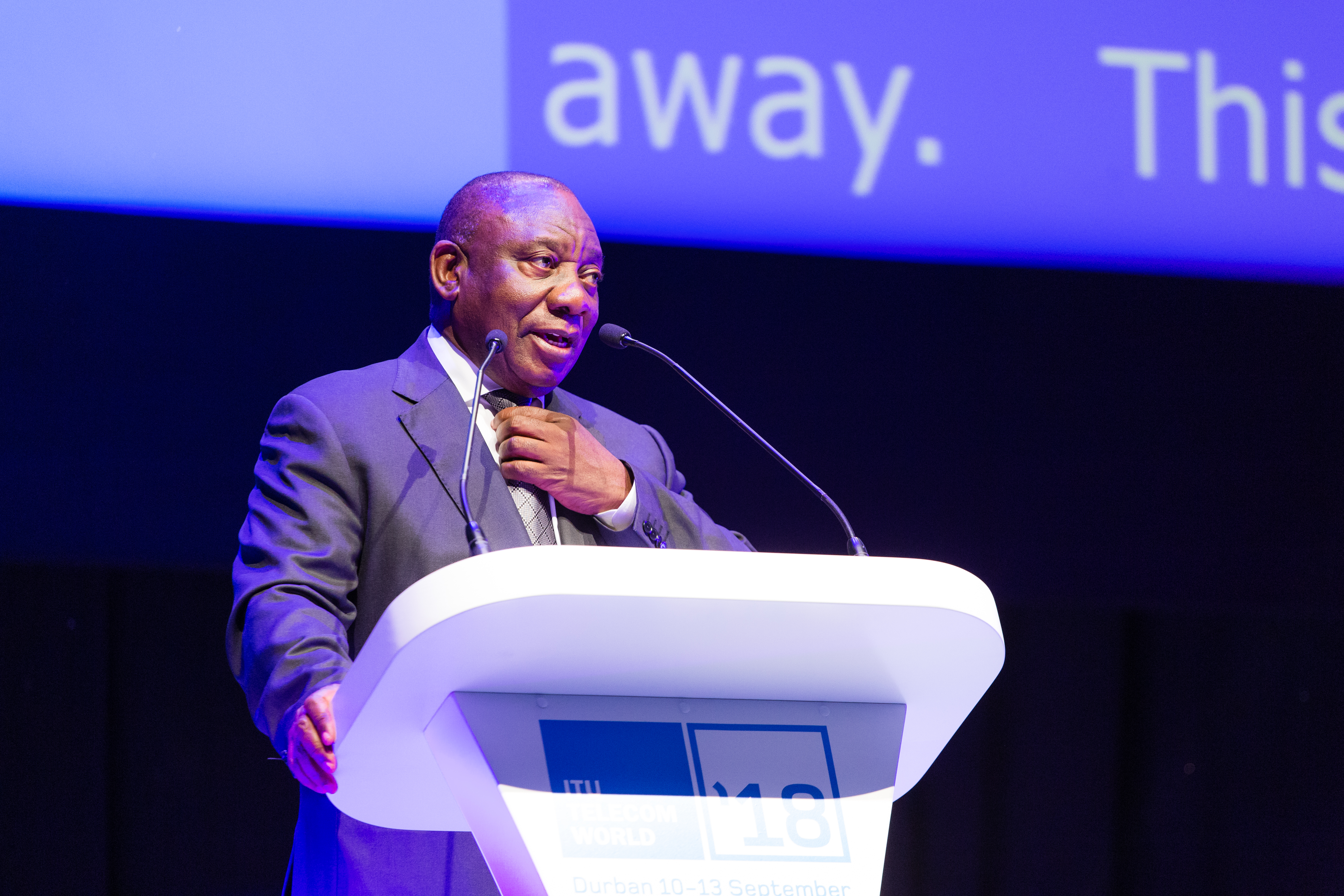
Cyril Ramaphosa

=== National ===
The National Disaster Management Centre has been activated. President Cyril Ramaphosa visited Eastern Cape on 13 June to oversee relief efforts; while visiting, he blamed the flooding on climate change. Some opposition political party members criticized the response of the Government and President.

On 18 June, a week after the floods began, the Department of Cooperative Governance and Traditional Affairs (COGTA) has declared a national disaster in South Africa following severe weather in the country. National Disaster Management Centre head Elias Sithole said that the magnitude of extensive damage warranted a national response.

On 4 July, it was announced that The South African National Defence Force and Mercedes-Benz had joined the collective effort to support flood victims in the OR Tambo and Amathole districts. The provincial government also reported receiving donations from Shoprite, Meals on Wheels, AbaThembu Kingdom, amongst other entities.

=== International ===
On 2 July 2025, Chinese Foreign Minister Wang Yi sent his condolences to South African Minister of International Relations and Cooperation Ronald Lamola, saying that he was shocked by the floodings that occurred and the resulting casualties and property damage.
