= Ghana Meteorological Agency =

Government organization in Accra, Ghana

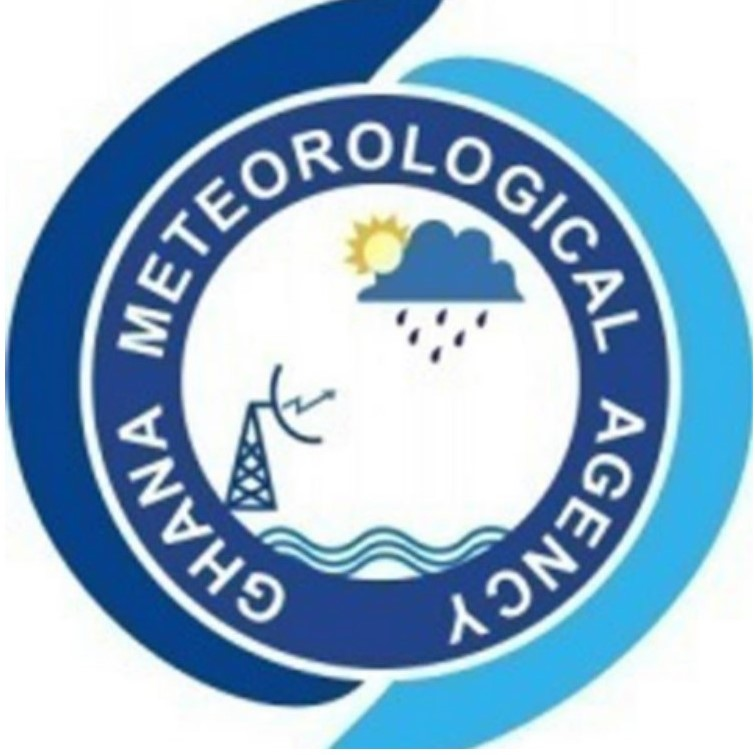

Agency overview
- Jurisdiction: Government of Ghana
- Agency executive: Michael Tanu, Director-General
- Parent department: Ministry of Communication(Ghana)
- Website: www.meteo.gov.gh/gmet

Ghana Meteorological Agency (GMet) is a governmental agency under the Ministry of Communication mandated to offer weather and climate services, to analyze scientific research findings and provide guidance on climate change.

It is a certified ISO 9001: 2015 weather forecast institution with its headquarters in Accra.

== History ==
The agency was established in 2004 by The Ghana Metrological Agency Act, 2004 Act 682 to replace the Ghana Meteorological Service Department, the latter was established in 1937 in the Gold Coast.

Observation of weather patterns started in the 1830s around Aburi Gardens in the Eastern Region by the Basel Mission. In 1886, the British colonial government setup three climatological stations along the coast of the colony, its operations were entrusted to the Medical departments.

With 14 synoptic stations in 1957, it has increased to 25, with 210 approximate stations. These stations can be located in Navorongo, Accra, Wenchi, Sunyani, Kete-krachi, Yendi, Kumasi, Koforidua, Ho, Abetifi, Akatsi, Takoradi, Saltpond, Big-Ada, Akuse, Sefwi-Bekwai, Axim, Akim-Oda, Abetifi, Tarkwa, Enchi and Akosombo. The agency is financed under the National Meteorological Fund.

== Departments ==
The Agency has the following departments;

- Synoptic Meteorology and Forecasting
- Support Services
- Research and Applied Meteorology
- Engineering
- Basic Network and Data Processing

== Meteorological services ==
The Ghana Meteorological Agency provides meteorological and services to the general public and sectors that covers all the timescales of forecasting. From historical services through nowcasting to short range, medium range, extended range, seaosnal and climate projections. The institution does research into weather and climate information relevant to specific sectors and advise government based on research outputs. It also provides specialized services to other agencies and institutions, these include:

- 10 day rainfall bulletin to Water Research Institute (WRI)
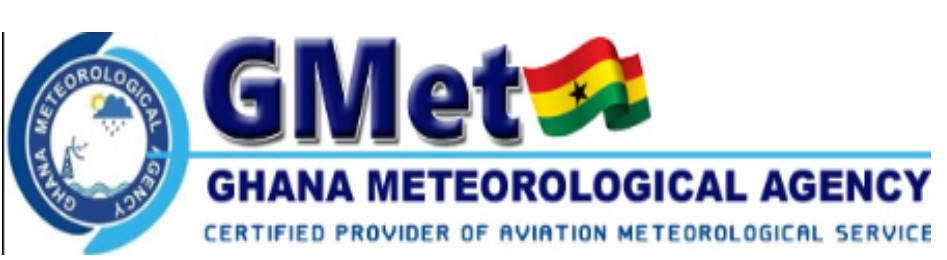
- Logo of the GMet.
  Keeps meteorological watch -over the Flight Information Region for the Ghana Civil Aviation Authority
- Rainfall and Evaporation data for management of the hydro-electric dams at Akosombo and Kpong to the Volta River Authority
- Briefing of trainee pilots and pilots of the Ghana Military Aviation
- Maritime weather to the Ghana Navy
- Six hourly maritime weather forecasts to ships both on high seas and in Port Operations on weather warnings, sea surface temperatures.

== Heads of Meteorological Organization ==
The current Director-General is Dr. Eric Asuman.
