= 2010 Agona Swedru flood =

2010 flood in Ghana

The Agona Swedru flood occurred in June 2010 following heavy rains that caused the Birim River to overflow, leading to widespread destruction in the Agona West District of Ghana's Central Region.

== Impact of the flood ==
The flooding affected numerous communities, including Salem and Sabon Zongo, where homes were destroyed or severely damaged. Over 2,300 people were displaced, with many seeking refuge in public buildings like town halls, schools, and churches. The flooding also caused the collapse of a major bridge, cutting off access to surrounding areas. Emergency services, led by the National Disaster Management Organization (NADMO), provided relief, but challenges remained due to the widespread destruction of homes, schools, and infrastructure. Health risks such as waterborne diseases were heightened due to poor sanitation, and immediate humanitarian aid was required to address food shortages and provide clean water and medical supplies.

The National Disaster Management Organisation (NADMO) record about 3,000 people as victims.
