= 2020 African Sahel floods =

Natural disaster in Africa

- Date: August–September 2020
- Location: Burkina Faso; Cameroon; Chad; Ghana; Kenya; Mali; Niger; Nigeria; South Sudan; Sudan; Uganda

In all of 2020, flooding affected 2.7 million people in 18 countries in West and Central Africa and destroyed 197,000 houses, with many regions recording excess rainfalls. The number of flood-affected people this year was more than twice the case in 2019. Particularly from August to September 2020, more than 1.21 million people in East, West, and Central Africa were affected by floods across Africa due to more extreme rainfall than the usual rainy season.

The flood in 2020 destroyed 422,000 hectares of farmland, which resulted in the destruction of crops and fields, threatening the livelihoods of communities whose majority rely on agriculture. The people in this region have already suffered from food insecurity, so the severe flood made their living conditions even worse. What threatened the East, West, and Central African region this year was not only the continuous floods but also the COVID-19 pandemic and Ebola epidemic in the Democratic Republic of Congo. The United Nations Office for the Coordination of Humanitarian Affairs (OCHA) warned that floods also risk increasing the incidence of water-borne diseases, impact hygiene and sanitation, and reduce the capacity to put in place effective preventative measures against COVID-19.

== Effect ==
The flood caused so much damage to properties, and even lives were lost. Thousands of people have been affected by flooding. Dozens of homes have been swept away by flash floods.

Burkina Faso

Due to the heavy rain from August 30 to September 4, three people died in Burkina Faso.

Cameroon

The heavy rain on August 21, 2020, destroyed Douala, Cameroon's economic city, and damaged its economic infrastructure. In addition, hundreds of homes were damaged resulting in the displacement of approximately 900 families. More than 26,000 hectares of crops have been damaged and 12,996 head of cattle have perished nationwide.

Chad

The rainfall in August 2020 in Chad displaced more than 120,000 people including 32,000 in its Capital city, N’Djamena. According to the International Organization for Migration (IOM), in the Lake Region, the rainfall in August 2020 recorded the highest in 30 years.

Ghana

In the northern and northeast regions of Ghana, 4 people died due to the flood in August 2020, and infrastructure and farmland were destroyed.

Kenya

Due to the flood of Lake Turkana in northwestern Kenya, at least 1,000 families were displaced. In the Western Kenya region, the flood in April 2020 forced about 400 families to move, so the August flooding worsened the situation in Kenya.

Mali

In Mali, the flood began in July 2020. It affected more than 10,000 people and destroyed 1,160 homes in total. The increasing number of displaced people could cause a lack of humanitarian supplies.

Niger

Heavy rain and flood hit Niger from August 23, 2020, resulting in a total of 2,283 households (approximately 15,981 people) have been affected with many of them displaced and taking refuge in local schools or host families in eight regions due to the water rise of the Niger River.

Nigeria

Heavy rainfall hit northwest and north central Nigeria from August 3 to August 9, 2020, resulting in 4 dead, 15,000 displaced. Additionally, due to the long-standing tensions between ethnic and linguistic groups in the area, plus numerous attacks by criminal groups, the latest attacks have affected another 3,552 individuals, including 153 injuries and 40 fatalities.

South Sudan

Due to the flooding of the White Nile, over 200,000 people have been displaced and thousands of homes have been reportedly destroyed, along with crops and livestock. In the northern area along the White Nile, the floods affected around 30,000 people.

Sudan

During the rainy season in 2020, at least 84 people died, and 381,770 were affected by heavy rains in 17 states out of 18 states in Sudan. More than 37,000 homes have been destroyed, forcing most of the families affected to seek shelter with relatives and host communities. In addition, 39,000 houses 34 schools, and 2,671 health facilities have been damaged.

Uganda

According to the Ugandan government, the severe rainfall in August 2020 caused rising water levels on Lake Albert and Lake Kyoga, which displaced over 8,700 people in Buliisa, Nakasongola and Amolatar districts. Amid this flood, Uganda's Red Cross warned the worse hygiene and sanitary conditions.

== International responses ==
Amid the urgent needs of humanitarian supplies, both domestic and international organizations provided immediant responses led by Civil Protection and Disaster Management Agencies, national Red Cross societies, NGOs, and community-based organizations. For example, Solidarités international immediately worked with them, such as South Sudan and Cameroon to provide water infrastructure and hygiene and sanitation kits. In addition, the Central Emergency Response Fund (CERF) has allocated US$5 million to Niger, and European Civil Protection and Humanitarian Aid Operations (ECHO) supports the flood response in 8 countries in the region with a total amount of $2.7 million as well as responding to the acute needs of the most vulnerable and displaced people.
