= 2023 Akosombo Dam spillage =

Flood in the south-eastern part of Ghana

The Akosombo Dam spillage flood was a riverine flood that occurred in the south-eastern part of Ghana in late 2023. This was due to a controlled spillage of the Akosombo Dam and the Kpong Dam by the Volta River Authority to address rising water levels.

According to BBC News, the cause of the flood was the heavy rainfall experienced in Ghana during 2023, leading to an increased volume of water in the two dams, which in turn led to the Volta River Authority's initiation of controlled spillage of the dam in September 2023.

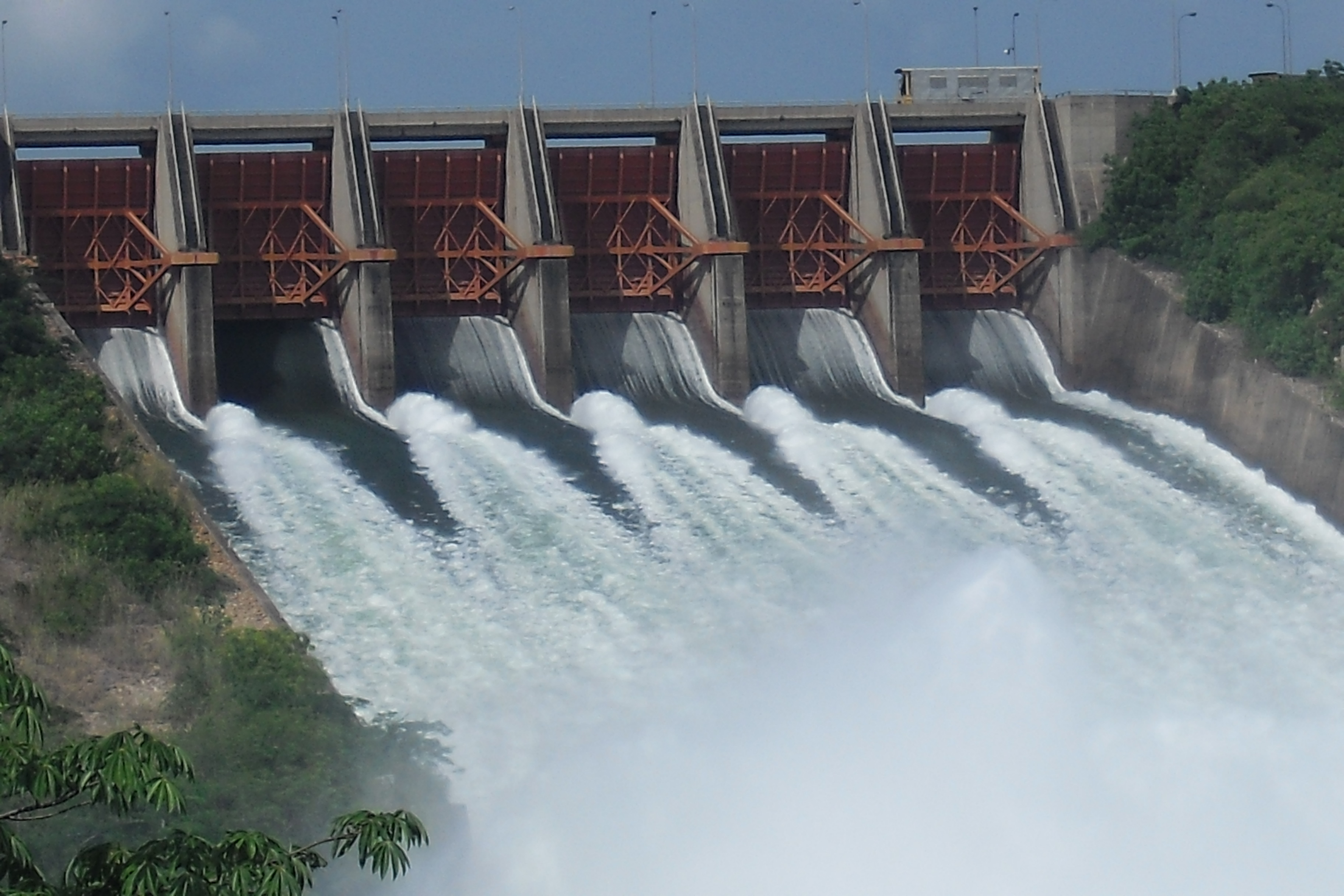
Akosombo dam spillage 2010

== Background ==
The Akosombo Dam has a 150-billion-cubic-meter storage capacity with a maximum operating level of 276 feet. Due to the effects of climate change, Ghana has been experiencing rising levels of rainfall, causing the water levels to rise beyond the maximum operation capacity. Without the spillage exercise, this could lead to dam failure. The spillage exercise started on 15 September 2023, at 183,000 cfs/day. This was increased on 9 October 2023, due to continued rise of the water level.

== Impact ==
The spillage led to the displacement of 8,000 people in 8 communities along the Volta River downstream, with Mepe being the most affected. The numbers had increased to 31,000 as of 19 October 2023. The number of affected people, children included, increased to 35,857 as at 17 November 2023.

Communities impacted by the flood included the districts of North, Central and South Tongu in the Volta Region, as well as the Asuogyaman District in the Eastern Region. Large portions of Tefle, Wume, Sokpoe and other riverbank communities were also affected by the floods, and at least 500 people were left without a place to live. Other localities, such as Alikekope, Agorme and Agbave, completely disappeared.
