= 2016 Accra floods =

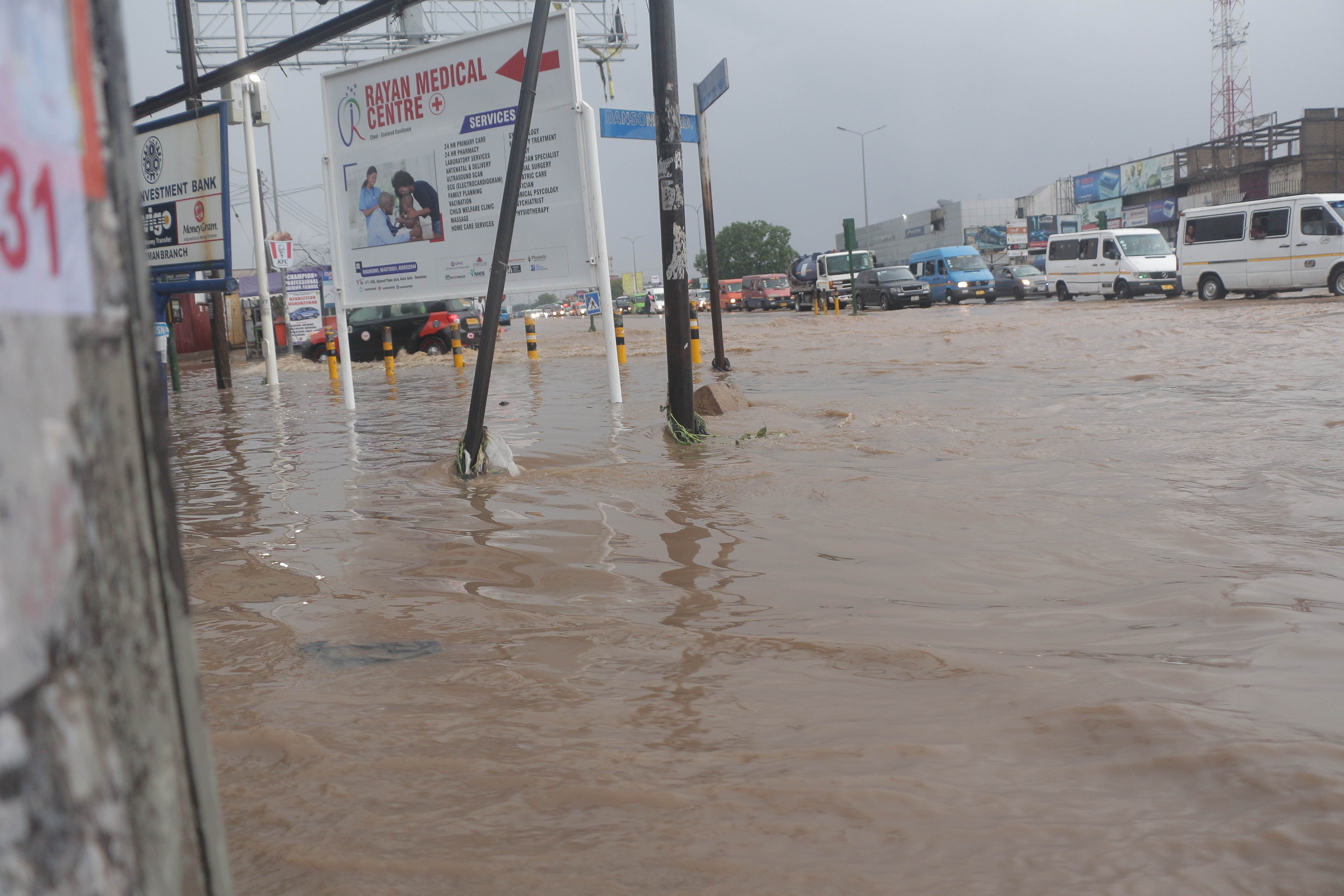
Most part of Accra mostly flooded during rainy season, causing environmental crisis in Ghana

The 2016 Accra floods were heavy rainfalls in Accra, the capital of Ghana in June 2016. The flood began on June 9, 2016. As of June 15, 2016, at least 10 people had been killed.

== See also ==
- 2015 Accra floods
