= 2011 Atiwa floods =

2011 Atiwa Flooding

The 2011 Atiwa District floods occurred in the early hours of Monday, July 20, 2011, in the Eastern Region of Ghana. A heavy downpour of about 10 hours of torrential rain caused the Birim River to overflow its banks, resulting in widespread flooding of houses and farmlands in various communities. The towns most affected included Anyinam, Asaman Tamfoe, Osonase, Abomosu, Jejeti, Akwabooso, and Asunafo, all located within the Atiwa District. The flooding led to severe damage to infrastructure, homes, and agricultural lands, displacing many residents and cutting off some towns from the rest of the country due to impassable access roads.

The floodwaters submerged vast areas of farmland, destroying crops and displacing farmers who depended on agriculture for their livelihoods. Fish ponds located on the outskirts of Anyinam, containing over 2,000 species of fish, were also swept away, adding to the economic toll of the disaster. In Jejeti, a local clinic's pharmacy suffered extensive damage, with floodwaters destroying essential drugs and supplies. Residents of the affected areas recounted significant losses of personal belongings and household items, many of which were damaged beyond recovery by the floodwaters.

Five people were reported dead, over 9,000 people displaced, and more than 700 houses affected by the floods. The extensive damage also impacted farms, roads, and personal property, following more than 36 hours of continuous rainfall in some parts of the Eastern Region.

The primary cause of the flooding was the unusually heavy rainfall, local residents attributed the severity of the disaster to the activities of illegal miners, known as "Galamsey" operators, along the Birim River. The miners had reportedly diverted the river's course which flowed into the river and conducted mining operations in the riverbed, massive deforestation and siltation was believed contributed to the river's overflow. The environmental impact of the illegal mining activities reduced the river's natural flood control capacity, making the surrounding areas more susceptible to flooding.

The flooding also disrupted transportation, cutting off some towns from the rest of the country as access roads became impassable, including the Anyinam-Nkawkaw portion of the Accra-Kumasi highway. Neighboring areas in the Fanteakwa District and East Akim Municipalities were similarly affected. Many residents reported significant losses, with household items destroyed and fish ponds near Anyinam, containing over 2,000 fish species, washed away by the floodwaters.

In response to the disaster, the late President John Atta Mills, accompanied by ministers of state and officials from the National Disaster Management Organisation (NADMO), visited some of the affected areas. The situation prompted the Member of Parliament (MP) for Atiwa West, Kwasi Amoako-Atta, to take immediate action. Amoako-Atta expressed concern over the illegal mining activities along the Birim River and called for government intervention to clamp down on these operations, which he believed had worsened the flooding.

The MP coordinated with local officials, including the National Disaster Management Organisation (NADMO) and the District Chief Executive (DCE), to provide relief to those affected. NADMO was tasked with distributing emergency supplies, such as food, water, and shelter materials, to displaced residents.
