= List of floods =

A flood is an overflow of water that covers land which is normally dry. In the sense of "flowing water", the term can also refer to the incoming flow of tides. Floods are studied within the field of hydrology and are a major concern in areas such as agriculture, civil engineering, and public health.

== List of floods ==
=== 20th century BCE ===
- Jishi Gorge outburst flood about 1920 BCE

=== 14th century ===
- Saint Marcellus' flood a storm tide is also called the "Second St. Marcellus flood".
- St. Mary Magdalene's flood occurred on and around the feast day of St. Mary Magdalene, 25 July; the passage of a Genoa low the rivers Rhine, Moselle, Main, Danube, Weser, Werra, Unstrut, Elbe, Vltava and their tributaries inundated large areas. Even the river Eider north of Hamburg flooded the surrounding land. Many towns such as Cologne, Mainz, Frankfurt am Main, Würzburg, Regensburg, Passau and Vienna were seriously damaged. The affected area extended to Carinthia and northern Italy. The overall number of casualties is not known, but it is believed that in the Danube area alone 6000 people were killed.

=== 15th century ===
- The All Saints Day Flood of 1436 (German: Allerheiligenflut) on All Saints' Day (1 November) 1436 was a storm tide that hit the entire North Sea coast of the German Bight. In the North Frisian village of Tetenbüll alone 173 people died. Eidum on the island of Sylt was destroyed; its inhabitants left and founded the village of Westerland as a result. List on Sylt was also abandoned after the floods and rebuilt further west. Dykes burst along the river Oste and in Kehdingen. The island of Pellworm was separated from neighbouring Nordstrand, Germany and only diked again in 1550.

=== 16th century ===
- 1530 St. Felix's flood
- Mississippi River Flood of March 1543. The flooding reportedly lasted for 40 days.

=== 17th century ===
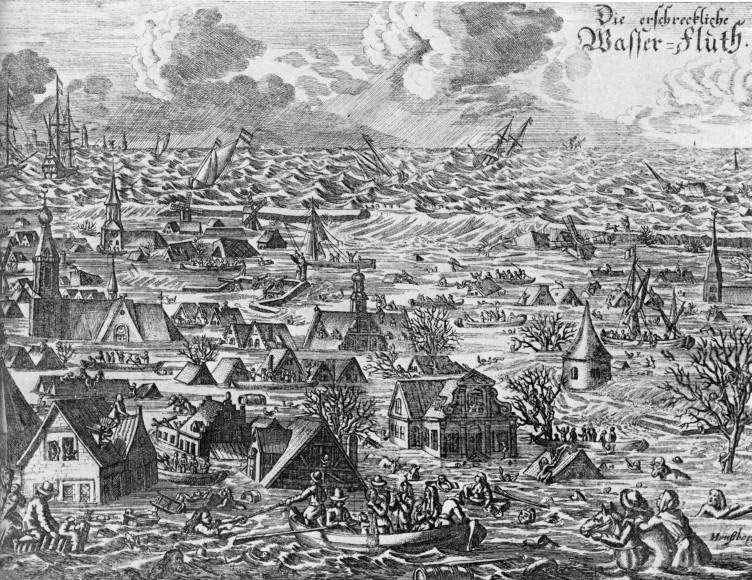
Contemporary picture of the flood that struck the North Sea coast of Germany and Denmark in October 1634

- The California Flood of 1605 was caused by heavy rains and covered many parts of California in water.
- The Burchardi Flood was a storm tide that struck the North Sea coast of North Frisia and Dithmarschen on the night between 11 and 12 October 1634. Overrunning dikes, it shattered the coastline and caused thousands of deaths (8,000 to 15,000 people drowned).

=== 18th century ===
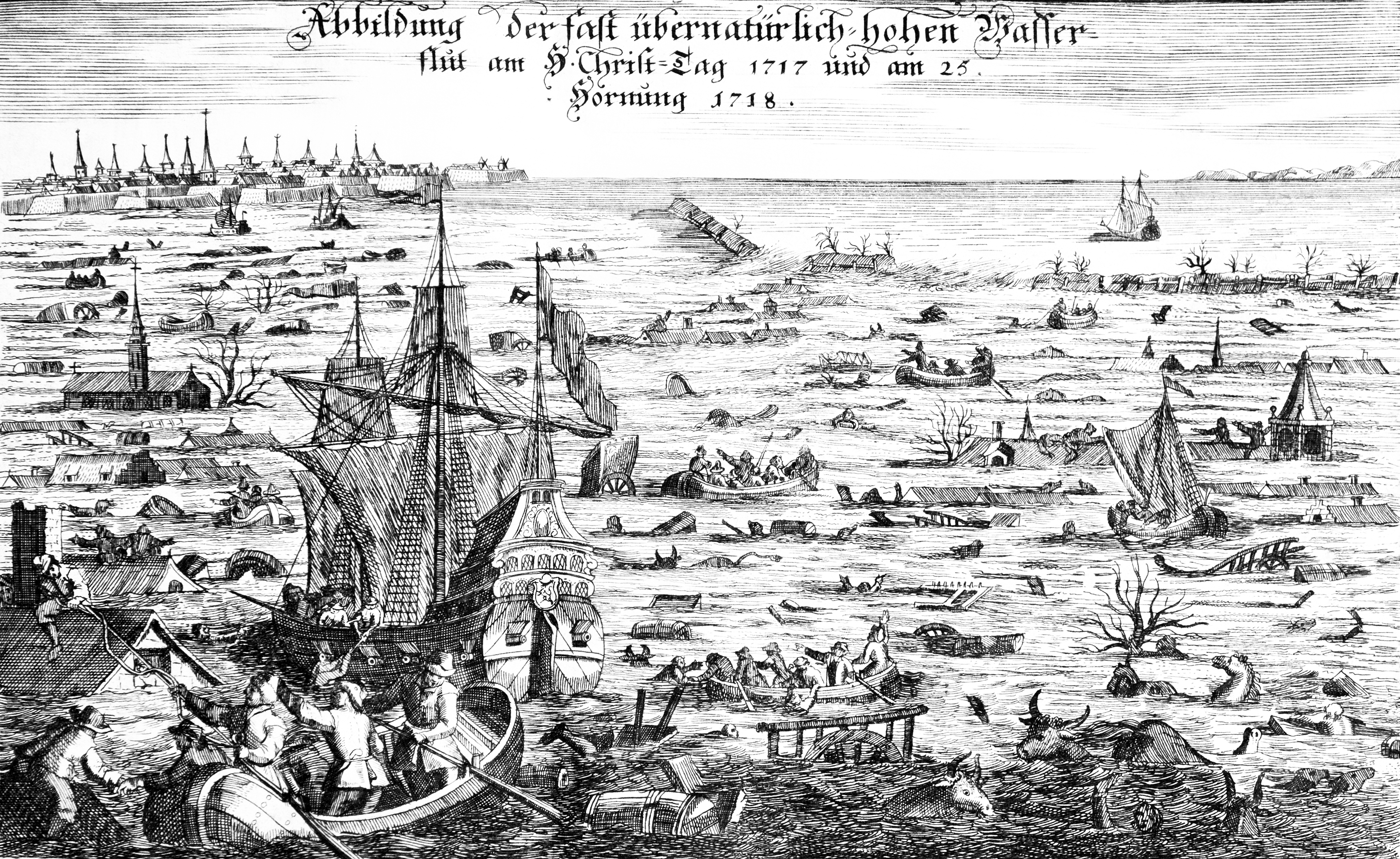
The Christmas flood of 1717

- Christmas Flood of 1717. Flood in Netherlands, Germany, and Scandinavia. 14,000 drowned.
- Mississippi River Flood of December 1734 to June 1735. New Orleans was inundated by the flooding.
- New Hampshire Flood of 1740. The Merrimack River flooded in December. It is the first recorded flood in New Hampshire history.
- New Hampshire/Maine Flood of October 1785. In New Hampshire, a significant flood struck the Cocheco, Baker, Pemigewasset, Contoocook and Merrimack rivers on 23 October which established records at Lowell which held until 1902. The Androscoggin River flooded significantly, which destroyed many homesteads in what would become Bethel, Maine. Those that survived the flood moved uphill into less valuable, 100-acre (0.40 km^{2}) plots. Turner's first mill was destroyed during this inundation.
- Great Pumpkin Flood of October 1786. Central Pennsylvania flood. Received its name due to the pumpkins that were washed away in the flood on 5 October. It was a major flood in the Susquehanna River basin.
- Mississippi River Flood of July 1788. Severe flooding of the Mississippi River resulted from a hurricane landfall
- Storofsen, Norway, flood of July 1789
- Red River of the South flood of 1800. According to the Caddo tribe, a "great flood" moved down the river and reinforced the "Great Log Raft" on the river. This raft was a natural dam that increased water levels on some of the Red River tributaries. This process formed Caddo Lake.

=== 19th century ===
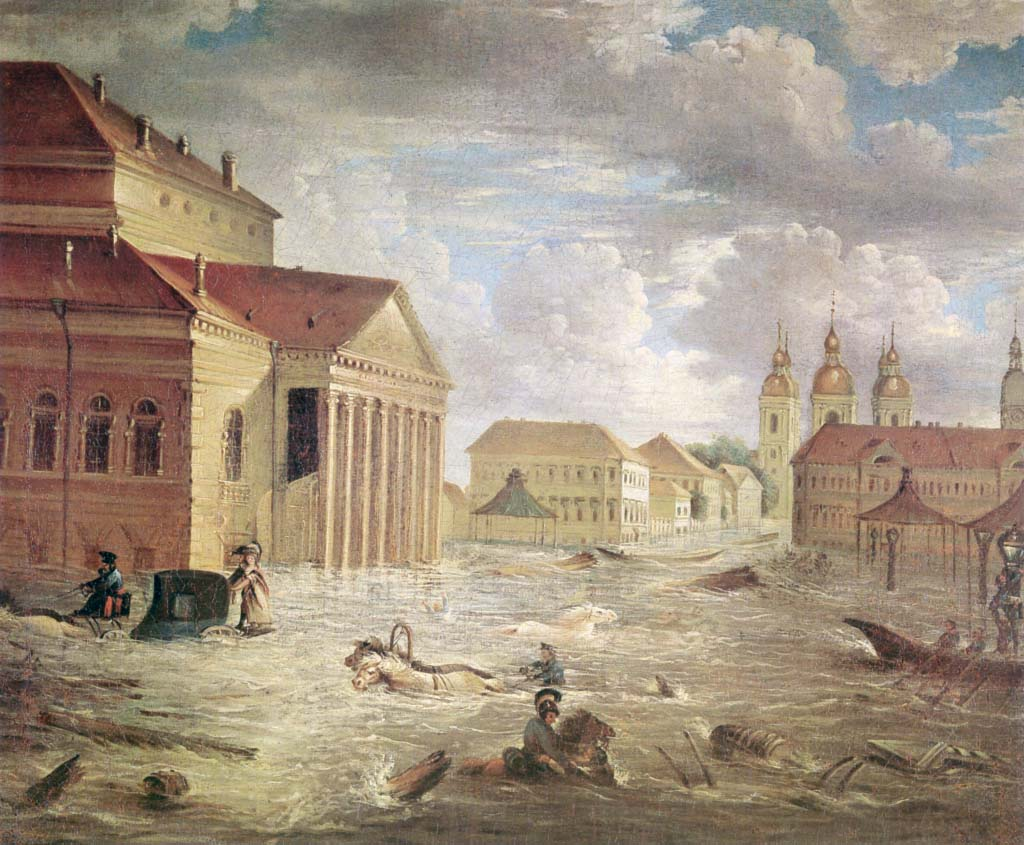
Floods in Saint Petersburg on 19 November 1824

- Mississippi River Flood of 1809. All of the lower Mississippi River was inundated by flooding.
- Mississippi River Flood of 1825. The flood of 1825 is the last known inundation of New Orleans due to spring flooding
- Great Mississippi River Flood of 1844. The largest flood ever recorded on the Missouri River and Upper Mississippi River in terms of discharge. This flood was particularly devastating since the region had few if any levees at the time. Among the hardest hit were the Wyandot who lost 100 people in the diseases that occurred after the flood. The flood also is the highest recorded for the Mississippi River at St. Louis. After the flood, Congress in 1849 passed the Swamp Act providing land grants to build stronger levees.
- Great Mississippi River Flood of 1851. The flood occurred after record-setting rainfalls across the U.S. Midwest and Plains from May to August 1851. The State of Iowa experienced significant flooding extending to the Lower Mississippi River basin. Historical evidence suggest flooding occurred in the eastern Plains, from Nebraska to the Red River basin, but these areas were sparsely settled in 1851. Heavy rainfall also occurred in the Ohio River basin. In June, major flooding on the Mississippi River was experienced.
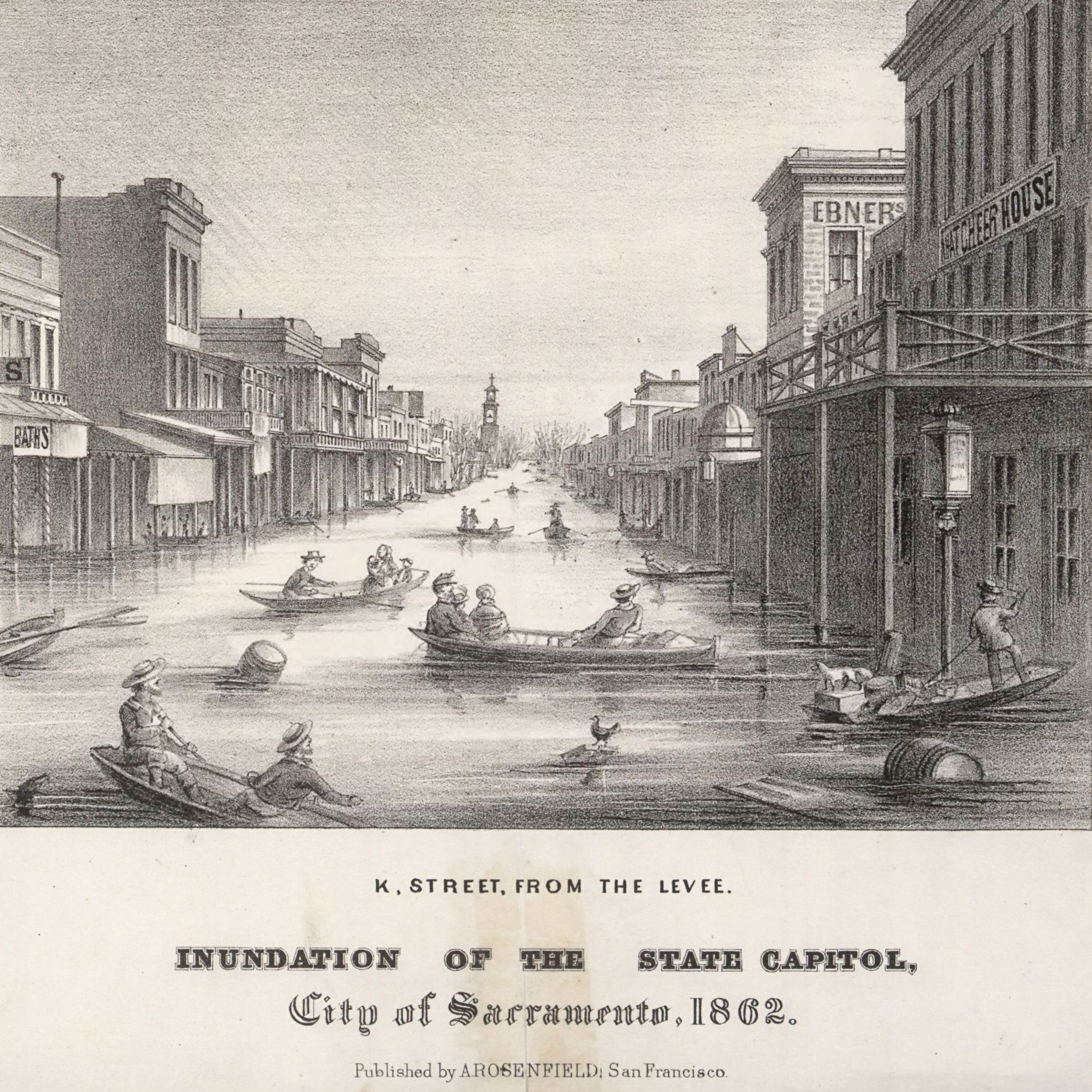
  Great Flood of 1862
- The Great Flood of 1862. Struck the west coast of North America in December 1861 and January 1862. An atmospheric river from the tropics brought 43 days of rain to the U.S. states of California, Utah and Oregon as well as the Mexican state of Sonora. It was the worst disaster ever to strike California; the state's Central Valley was effectively an inland sea for months afterwards. State government temporarily moved to San Francisco because the capital, Sacramento, was under 10 feet (3.3 m) of water; the damage and the ensuing shortfall in tax revenues nearly bankrupted the state.
- The 1872 Baltic Sea flood. Storm surge that affected the Baltic Sea coast from Denmark to Pomerania on the night of 12–13 November 1872. The flood cost the lives of at least 271 people on the Baltic Sea coast; 2,850 houses were destroyed or at least badly damaged and 15,160 people left homeless as a result.
- Great Mississippi River Flood of 1874. Heavy spring rains caused the Mississippi River to overflow, breaching levees and flooding enormous swathes of the Lower Mississippi Valley. The flooding began in February and only began to recede on 20 May. According to the New Orleans Daily Picayune of 3 May, thirty-one of Louisiana's fifty-three parishes (home to some 375,000 people) were entirely or partially underwater. The Picayune also reported that breaches at Hushpakana^{[sic.]} and Bolivar, Mississippi, had "transformed the Yazoo Valley into an inland lake." Mayor Louis A. Wiltz of New Orleans published a circular on 30 May addressed to "the Mayors of thirty-four large American cities" seeking contributions of cash and provisions for relief efforts. In the circular, the Flood of 1874 was described as the highest on record. It also included the observations of former U.S. Surveyor General for Louisiana William J. McCulloh, who estimated that a total of 12,565,060 acres had been flooded across Louisiana (8,065,000), Mississippi (2,500,000), and Arkansas (2,000,000).
- Mississippi River Flood of 1882. Intense spring rain storms, beginning on 19 February 1882, led to a rapid rise of the Ohio River and flooding along the river from Cincinnati to St. Louis. The effects were much more devastating in the Lower Mississippi Valley, with an estimated 20,000 people made homeless in Arkansas alone. Such was the devastation that, in its wake, Southern Democrats and Midwestern Republicans in Congress hailing from those states afflicted by the flooding made common cause to increase appropriations for the Rivers and Harbor Act to $19 million, $5.4 million of which was earmarked for internal improvements and federal aid to the flooded areas. While not opposed to internal improvements on principle, President Chester A. Arthur nonetheless vetoed the Act on 1 August 1882. Congress overrode his veto the following day.
- In 1889, the South Fork Dam broke, causing the massive Johnstown Flood of 1889 that took 2,209 lives in Johnstown, Pennsylvania.
- On 8 September 1900, in Galveston, Texas, a storm made landfall, leaving about 7,000 to 12,000 dead. It remains to the present day the deadliest single-day event in US history.

=== 20th Century ===
==== 1910s ====
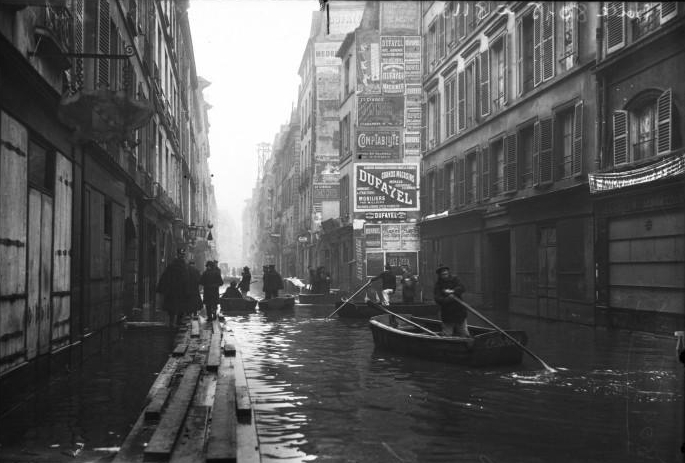
1910 Great Flood of Paris

- In January 1910, large areas of Paris were flooded when the river burst its banks.
- In June 1910 heavy rains caused extreme flooding throughout central Europe killing more than 1200 people.
- The Great Flood of 1913, which included the Great Dayton Flood, killed 650 people and destroyed 20,000 homes in the United States. It also damaged historic photographic plates belonging to Wilbur and Orville Wright. It ended canal transportation in Ohio.
- The 1916 Clermont, Queensland flood was the worst flood in Clermont history.
- The Hatfield Flood of San Diego, United States, of 1916 destroyed the Lower Otay Dam, damaged Sweetwater Dam, and caused 22 deaths and $4.5 million in damages.
- In 1919, The Great Molasses Flood swept through the North End of Boston, killing 21 people.

==== 1920s ====
- In 1920, The Great Flood of Tokyo, when 37 houses were swept away, 2200 were partially destroyed, and nearly 400,000 were damaged.
- The Great Mississippi Flood of 1927 was one of the most destructive floods in United States history and the impetus for many later Flood Control Acts.
- The Great Vermont Flood of 1927 which destroyed over 1200 bridges in Vermont, and one of the biggest floods in its history.
- The 1929 New Zealand cyclone caused the deepest flood ever to hit the city of Dunedin.

==== 1930s ====
- The 1931 Yellow River flood caused between 800,000 and 4,000,000 deaths in China, one of a series of disastrous floods on the Yellow River. It was one of the worst floods in history.
- The Ohio River flood of 1937 occurred in late January and February 1937, causing damage along the Ohio River and several smaller tributaries from Pittsburgh, Illinois, to Cairo, Illinois. This flood left close to one million people homeless, 385 dead, and $50,000,000 worth of damage.
- The Los Angeles flood of 1938 occurred from late February to early March 1938, causing the Los Angeles River and the Santa Ana River to overflow, causing $40,000,000 worth of damage and causing 115 lives to be lost.
- The 1938 Hanshin flood occurred in July 1938 in Kobe area in Japan, causing 925 lost lives as exceptionally heavy seasonal raining caused landslides at Rokko mountains.

==== 1940s ====
- The 1941 flood in Porto Alegre was the second biggest flood ever recorded in the city of Porto Alegre, surpassed only by the 2024 flood. For 22 days, in the months of April and May 1941
- 1948 Columbia River flood
- The 1948 Berwickshire flood occurred on 12 August, when extremely heavy rain for the preceding six days caused the rivers Tweed, Blackadder, Whiteadder, Till and Eye Water in southern Scotland to rise more than 10 feet and wash away 20 bridges. Railway service was interrupted for months.

==== 1950s ====
- The Lynmouth flood of 1952 killed 34 people, more than any other British flood up to then, it was also very destructive and destroyed over 80 buildings in the town of Lynmouth, Devon, United Kingdom.
- The North Sea Flood of 1953 caused over 2,000 deaths in the Dutch province of Zeeland and the about 50 in the United Kingdom (the coastlines of East Anglia and Lincolnshire were worst hit) and led to the construction of the Delta Works in the Netherlands and the Thames Barrier in London.
- 1953 North Kyushu Flood killed at least 890 and the killed and missing amounted to 1,001 in the northern Kyushu area of Japan.
- On 15 October 1954, Hurricane Hazel struck Toronto, Ontario, Canada. The resulting rainfall flooded the city, killing 81 people, destroying 20 bridges, and leaving over 2000 people homeless.
- The Hunter Valley floods of 1955 in New South Wales (Australia) destroyed over 100 homes and caused 45,000 to be evacuated.
- A levee failure on Christmas Eve, 1955, on the west bank of the Feather River, a large tributary of the Sacramento River in Northern California, flooded 90 percent of Yuba City, drowned 38, sent more than 20,000 in search of shelter, and resulted in some 600 helicopter rooftop rescues.
- The 1956 Murray River flood is considered the biggest flood in the history of Australia's Murray River affecting towns in three Australian states.
- 1957 Isahaya flood, due heavy torrential massive rain, maximum 1,108 mm (43.62 inches) in single day on July 24, 1957, following debris flow hit in Honmyō River and flash flood hit in Isahaya, Kyushu Island, Japan. 586 persons were perished in Isahaya, and overall death toll was 992, with 3,860 persons were hurt, according to Japan Fire and Disaster Management Agency official confirmed report.
- In 1957, the storm surge from Hurricane Audrey flooded southwest Louisiana, killing about 400 people.
- In 1957, the Great flood of Valencia in Spain.
- In 1959, the Río Negro flooded the central region of Uruguay, with disastrous consequences.

==== 1960s ====
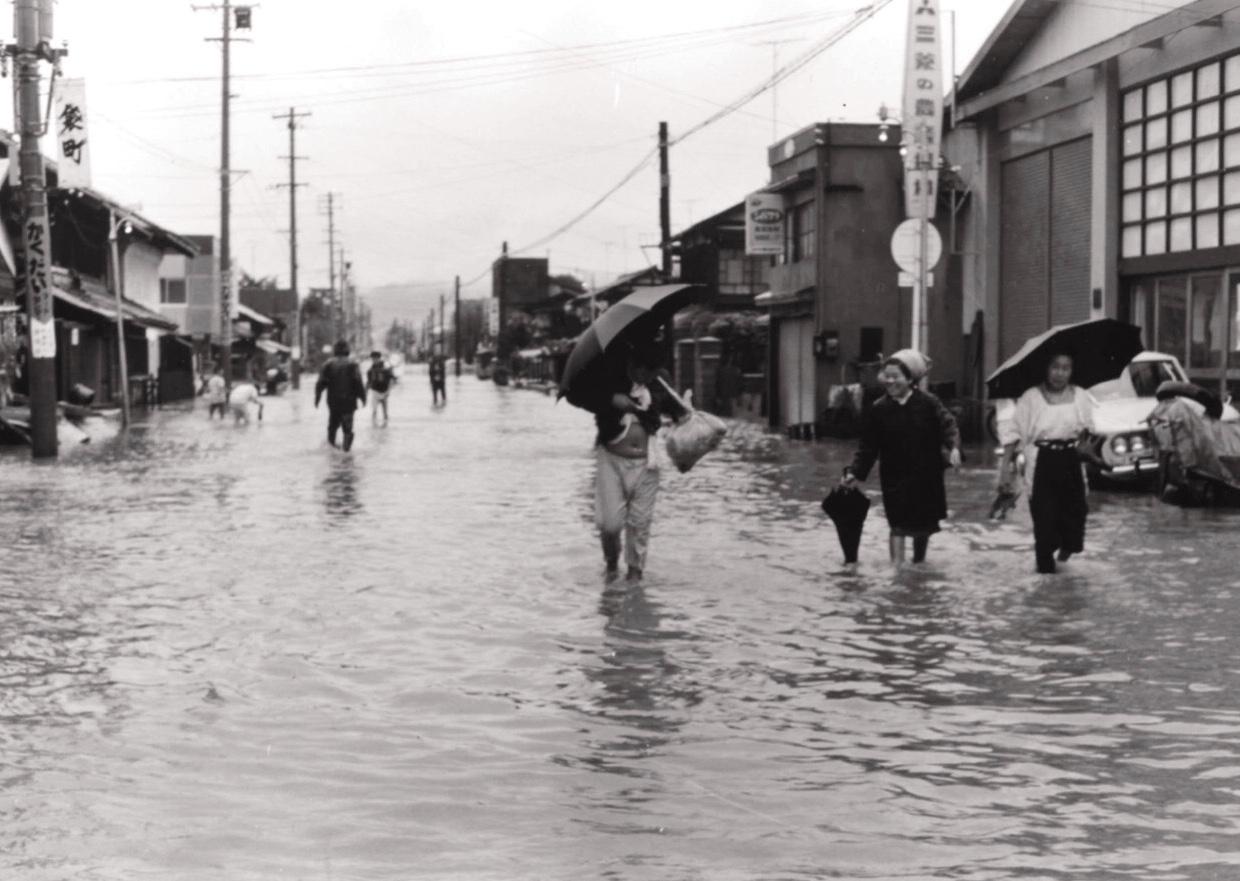
A flash flood from heavy massibie rain hit in Yonezawa, Yamagata Prefecture, Japan on 1967 Uetsu flood on August,

- In 1960, flooding from a deadly tsunami caused by the Great Chilean earthquake affected the towns of Riñihue, Riñihuazo, Los Lagos, Antilhue, Pishuinco, and Valdivia (all in Chile).
- The North Sea flood of 1962 killed almost 330 people along the coasts of southeastern England, Germany, and southern Denmark. 318 of the deaths occurred in Hamburg, Germany, and many millions of pounds' worth of damage was done.
- The Vallés floods on September 25, 1962, affected several towns and cities of Catalonia and resulted in 617 deaths and extensive material damage.
- On 25 October 1964, high water due to heavy rains upstream caused the River Sava to overflow its embankments in Zagreb, Croatia, killing 17 people, flooding much of the city, and causing devastating material damage.
- An earthquake in 1965 triggered the failure of six dams, two of which released millions of tonnes of water and debris that wiped away the town of El Cobre in the Valparaiso Region of Chile.
- In 1965, Hurricane Betsy flooded large areas of New Orleans, Louisiana, United States, for up to 10 days, drowning around 40 people.
- In 1966, the flood of the Arno River killed dozens of people and damaged or destroyed millions of masterpieces of art and rare books in Florence, Italy.
- 1967 Uetsu flood, a 200 to 700 mm (7.87 to 27.56 inches) of precipiotation observed in Murakami, Shibata and Oguni area, Niigata and Yamagata Prefecture, for four days, affective an autumn rain front line from Noto Peninsula to Iwaki, for these period on Honshu, Japan, where damaged multiple dams and river embankment collapse, and flood swept and debris flow on these area, total 146 persons were human fatalities, according to Japan Fire and Disaster Management Agency official confirmed report,

==== 1970s ====
- On the night of 9 June 1972 the people of Rapid City, South Dakota in the United States were struck by a deadly flood that lasted two days. It took 238 lives and caused millions of dollars in damage.
- On Luzon island in the Philippines, the "Great Luzon Flood" of 1972 was triggered by a series of storms during the 1972 Pacific typhoon season, namely Susan (locally named Edong), Rita (Gloring), Tropical Depression Huaning, Tropical Storm Winnie (Isang), and Tropical Depression Konsing. More than thirty days of constant rain over central Luzon left 565 dead (485 of whom had drowned), directly affected 5.5 million people, and left 2 Billion Philippine Pesos (unadjusted) in damage.
- In 1974, the dying cyclone Wanda triggered major flooding in Brisbane, Australia killing 6 people and leaving hundreds homeless.
- On 2 July 1975, many areas of Romanian Cuverture Charpatinas (e.g. Buzau, Prahova County), were struck by major flooding.
- In August 1975, the Banqiao Dam in China breaks apart under excess rainfall and damage from Typhoon Nina, drowning about 26,000 and caused the lives of another 140,000 in resulting epidemics.
- On July 31, 1976, a nearly stationary thunderstorm caused a major flash flood in the infamous Big Thompson River Canyon, claiming 139 lives. This occurred on the eve of Colorado's centennial.

==== 1980s ====
- During the 1980s, the Great Salt Lake reached record high water levels due to a large amount of rain and its lack of an outlet. Places such as Saltair were inundated.
- The South African town of Laingsburg was basically destroyed on 25 January 1981, when 104 of its 900 inhabitants died during a flood that swept through the town and left only about 25 houses standing
- In August 1982, Ulaanbaatar experienced a major flood that swept most of the houses for a few hours due to heavy rain, leaving 187 citizens dying.
- In 1982, the river Jucar in Spain breaks the Tous Reservoir, flooding the surrounding land in a deluge of 16,000 m^{3}/s of water, and killing 30 people.
- The 1983 Spanish floods in August led to the deaths of 34 people in northern Spain.
- In the winter of 1983, the Pacific Northwest of the United States saw one of the worst floods on record for that region, and some states recorded their wettest winter ever. Damage estimates are as high as $1.1 billion.
- Bangladesh floods

==== 1990–2000 ====
- January 1992 saw severe floods in South America, most notably Brazil.
- In Alaska, United States, from May to September 1992 it was unusually wet, causing the 100 year flood. Snow melt only made the floods worse.
- The Great Flood of 1993 was one of the most destructive floods in United States history.
- March 1993 the "No Name" storm, silently brought major flooding to Citrus County, Florida.
- The summer of 1993 was unusually wet for the United States, causing flooding in the southwest.
- The 1993 India floods killed more than a thousand people in Northern India, and more than 1800 people in Nepal, with fewer casualties in Bangladesh and Pakistan.
- 1994 South Georgina floods
- On 8 May 1995, severe floods caused extensive damage in Louisiana, United States.
- 1994-August, Massive Flood in Surat and burst of pneumonic plague
- 1996 Pacific Northwest floods
- A dying typhoon hit Kyushu, Japan, in September 1996, causing severe floods in that region.
- July 1996 saw severe floods in Central Honshū, Japan.
- In August 1996, 86 people died due to a flood in Las Nieves camping, in Biescas, Spain.
- 1997 Central European flood, the worst flood in Polish history hits the country in July 1997, killing 65 and causing extensive damage to Wrocław and Opole.
- The Red River Flood of 1997 (also called the Red River of the North Flood of 1997 in the United States) occurred in April and May 1997 along the Red River of the North in North Dakota, Minnesota (United States) and Manitoba. It was the most severe flooding of the river since 1826, with floodwaters peaking at 54 feet in Grand Forks, and reaching as far as 3 miles from the river in Southern Manitoba.
- Bangladesh was flooded in 1998, with millions of people affected and hundreds killed.
- The 1999 Pentecost flood (German: Pfingsthochwasser) was a 100-year flood around the Pentecost season in 1999 that mostly affected Bavaria, Vorarlberg and Tirol. It was caused by heavy rainfall coinciding with the regular Alpine meltwater. These were caused because of the low-lying area and they are replacing concrete with soil which affects the flow of water and can cause flash flooding.
- The 2000 Mozambique flood, caused by heavy rains followed by a cyclone, covered much of the country for three weeks, killing thousands, leaving the country devastated for years afterwards.

=== 21st century ===
==== 2000s ====
===== 2001 =====
- In June 2001, floods from Tropical Storm Allison killed over 30 people in the Houston, Texas, area.

===== 2002–2003 =====
- The 2002 Northern Chile floods and mudflow, hit Coquimbo and Valparaíso regions in Chile in June 2002 causing the deaths of 17 people.
- In 2002, the 2002 Glasgow floods hit Glasgow, Scotland, causing severe damage.
- In 2002, the 2002 European floods hit Central Europe, causing major damage.
- In July 2023, the 2023 Ulaanbaatar floods hit Ulaanbaatar, Mongolia, causing severe damage.
- On October 22, 2003, a large part of Western Sahara was hit by torrential rains, causing flooding.

===== 2004–2005 =====
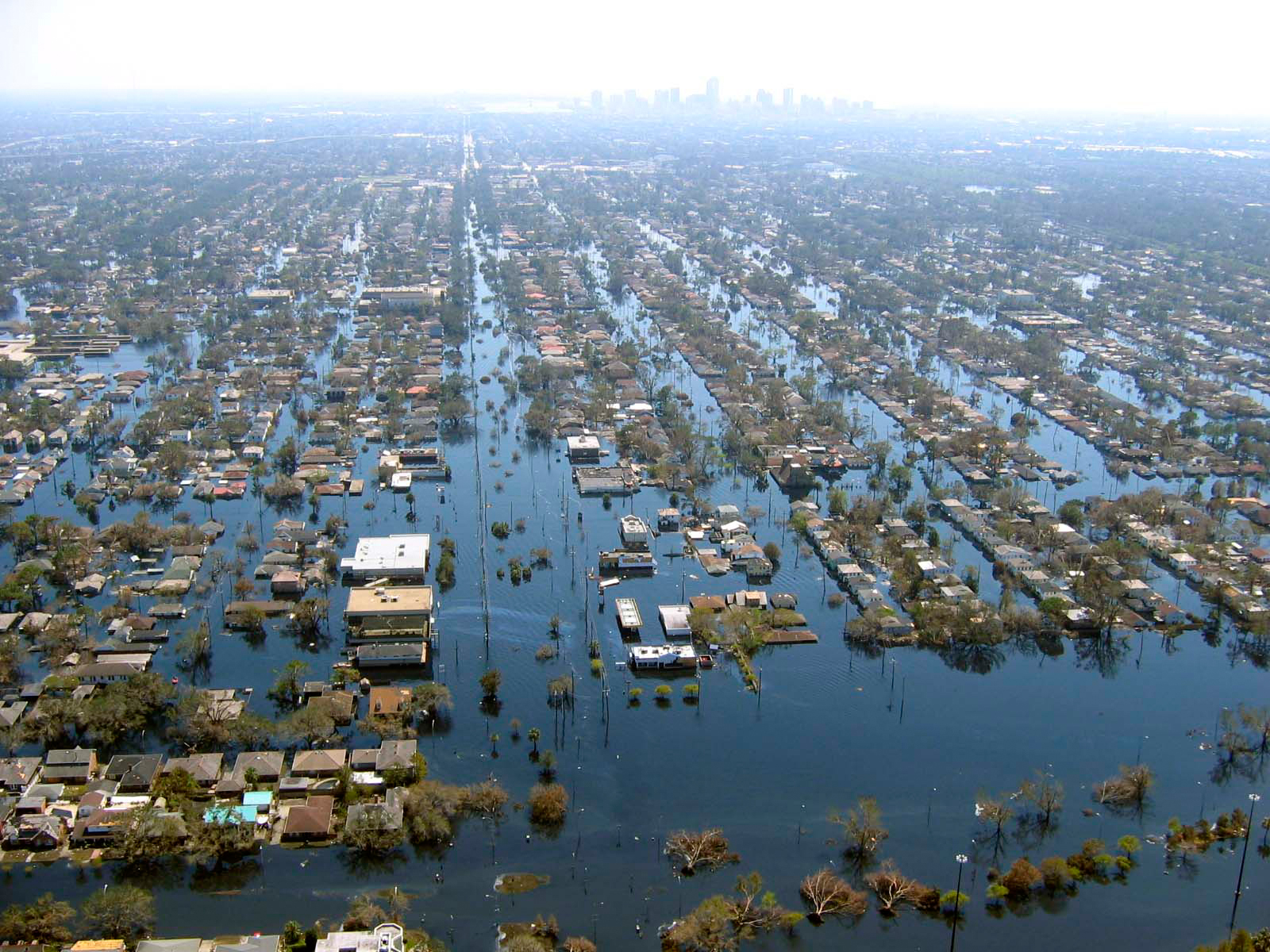
View of flooded New Orleans in the aftermath of Hurricane Katrina.

- The 2004 Boscastle flood on 16 August in the village of Boscastle, Cornwall, United Kingdom, caused much damage to buildings in the Valency River valley. Further flooding took place in surrounding valleys, and in the town of Camelford.
- In January 2005, flooding on the rivers Eden, Kent, Derwent, Greta and Cocker as well as others in Cumbria, England, flooded around 2,000 properties and caused in excess of £250 million of damage. At the time, it was the worst flood in Cumbrian history, but has since been overtaken by the Cumbria flooding of November 2009.
- One of Canada's most devastating floods occurred in southern Alberta in June 2005. The flooding affected many major metropolitan areas including Calgary. 4 deaths resulted from the three-week flood.
- Flooding in Mumbai, India, in July 2005 left over 700 dead. Some areas went under 5 m of water.
- Eighty percent of New Orleans, Louisiana, United States, was flooded due to the failure of several levees on 29 August 2005 during Hurricane Katrina. 1,833 people also died because of the hurricane.
- Record rain across eastern Europe in August 2005 caused very severe flooding.
- In November 2005, in the Indian states of Tamil Nadu and Andhra Pradesh, many villages were isolated due to heavy rains caused by low-pressure areas in the Bay of Bengal.

===== 2006–2007 =====
- From April 19 to 21 of 2006, a large part of Namibia's coast was hit by floods.
- Korea (both North Korea and South Korea) saw one of its worst floods ever in May 2006.
- The Mid-Atlantic States flood of 2006 in the eastern United States is considered to be the worst in that region since the flooding caused by Hurricane David in 1979.
- Ethiopia saw one of its worst floods ever in August 2006.
- Surat, a city of 5 million people in India, witnessed the largest flood in its history during 4 to 10 August 2006. Water discharged for 30 hours from Ukai dam, which flooded the city.
- Peninsular Malaysia, Sumatra, and Sabah suffered floods between December 2006 and January 2007. It killed hundreds and forced 100,000 people to be evacuated in Johor alone. Floods hit the country's capital Kuala Lumpur in January 2007, killing 80. It was the worst flood in Malaysia for over 100 years.
- The 2007 Hunter Floods inundated large areas of the cities of Maitland and Newcastle in Australia in June 2007, claimed 11 lives and forced the evacuation of 4,000 people in Central Maitland.
- Between late May 2007 and early August 2007, severe flash floods hit most of the United Kingdom, with the most affected area in the country being Yorkshire. The city of Sheffield (in Yorkshire) was the worst affected city in the country, a month's worth of rain fell on the city in just 18 hours on 25 June 2007, bursting the banks of the River Don in that city. There were also fears that the Ulley Reservoir in Sheffield would fail, if it did it would have killed hundreds. 6 people were killed across the country.
- The 2007 Africa Floods was one of the worst and most destructive floods in recorded history on the continent of Africa with 14 countries affected.
- In November 2007, Cyclone Guba, a slow moving storm caused deadly flooding in Papua New Guinea.
- The 2008 Indian floods affected several states in India between July 2008 and September 2008 during an unusually wet monsoon season. The floods caused severe damage, and killed an estimated 2404 people.

===== 2008–2009 =====
- 2008 Santa Catarina floods
- 2009 Brazilian floods and mudslides
- In June 2009, minor flooding hit parts of Sheffield City Centre in Sheffield, England. Waters reached only about half a foot deep as the River Don broke its banks, but considerable damage was still caused.
- In November 2009, record-breaking amounts of rain were dumped on Cumbria, England and Cork, Ireland, causing minor floods in Cork and major floods in Cumbria. During the floods, waters reached a UK record 8 ft deep in Cockermouth, Cumbria.

===== 2010 =====
- January 2010 Rio de Janeiro floods and mudslides
- Rio de Janeiro had its worst ever flood that killed over 250 people in April 2010.
- 2010 Northeastern Brazil floods
- Between June 2010 and August 2010, flooding in China affected more than 230 million people – with 15.2 million people evacuated and thousands dead.
- On 26 July 2010, heavy monsoon rains flooded most of Pakistan in the 2010 Pakistan floods.
- On 4 August 2010, at 9:25 am EST a major thunderstorm producing large hail and winds in excess of 60 mph (97 km/h) advanced at the leading edge of a cold front moving across the American Midwest, causing a flash flood that struck Louisville, Kentucky, and portions of the surrounding Kentuckiana region.
- In November 2010, many areas of Cornwall, UK, were struck by floods. The worst hit area was the town of Par.
- The November 2010 Colombia floods and associated landslides killed 138 people. 1.3 million were left homeless.
- The November 2010 Thailand floods and 2010 north Malaysian floods.
- The 2010–2011 Queensland floods are some of the worst the country of Australia has ever seen.

===== 2011 =====
- The January 2011 Brazil floods are considered the worst in the country's history. As of 18 January 2011, the floods had taken about 700 lives and 14,000 people were homeless mainly due to landslides.
- The Mississippi River floods in April and May 2011 were among the largest and most damaging recorded along the U.S. waterway.
- In June 2011, flooding in China affected more than 4.8 million people, with 100,000 evacuated and 54 reported dead.
- In late July, the 2011 Thailand floods spread through the provinces of Northern, Northeastern and Central Thailand along the Mekong and Chao Phraya river basins and persisted in some areas until mid-January 2012.
- In August–September 2011, there was floods in Khammouane Province in Laos, and then in northeastern Thailand, then came to Cambodia, and was drained via Mekong river to Vietnam then South China Sea.
- From September 4 to 11, Tropical Storm Lee made landfall on the central coast of Louisiana, bringing flash flooding to it as well as Alabama. Tracking up the Appalachian Mountains, 9-12 inches of rain fell in North-Central Georgia and up through the Tennessee Valley, where the low dissipated. Stalling over the Mid-Atlantic on the 7th-8th, moisture from Lee and ongoing Hurricane Katia interacted to produce up to 20 inches of rain along the Potomac River, with 9-12 inches falling over a huge majority of the Susquehanna Valley over Central Pennsylvania and the Southern Tier of NY. The Susquehanna and its tributaries would break record peaks by 1–4 feet on the 8th, producing the worst floods the areas have recorded.
- On 18 October 2011, Pulau Tioman of Malaysia was flooded in Kampung Tekek, and the jungle near the village, then came up to Salang on 23 October 2011, the drain was started in November.
- Around November 2011, northern part of Malaysia was flooded, and then to Narathiwat Province in Thailand.

===== 2012 =====
- In July 2012, heavy torrential rains caused floods in Kyushu, Japan, leaving 32 people dead or missing.
- In 2012 Great Britain and Ireland floods caused many floods in the United Kingdom, in April floods and gales hit most of England causing flooding and power outages, on 28 June 2012 there were two severe supercell thunderstorms which traveled across the West Midlands causing flash flooding, on 6 July 2012 heavy rainfall brought floods to the South West of England with the Met Office issuing red rain warnings, flooding later returned to the UK on 23 November 2012, as heavy persistent rainfall fell in South West England which caused rivers to burst their banks, the rain later pushed into the Midlands overnight causing more flooding, on 26 November 2012 another band of rain pushed into South West England, The Environment Agency issued three severe flood warnings for the South West England and 90 flood warnings, the following day the Environment Agency issued 110 flood warning for the Midlands, most of which were for the River Avon and the River Severn.

===== 2013 =====
- The 2013 North India floods and landslides caused by heavy rainfall. The floods struck the state of Uttarakhand. These floods killed 5,700 people.
- The 2013 European floods.
- Flash floods in Port Louis, Mauritius on 30 March 2013 cause drowning of 11 people in tunnels, waterways and carpark.
- 2013 Alberta flood — On 20 June 2013, widespread flooding in southern Alberta caused major damage in Canmore, Calgary and High River when the Cougar Creek, Highwood River, and other rivers and creeks overflowed caused by extensive rainfall. Other communities in the area were also affected, or were expected to be, by floods. Flooding also caused power outages and the closure of the Trans-Canada Highway and Highway 1A, as well as many other highways and roads. A man and a woman were reported missing after a mobile home was swept into the Highwood River near the town of Black Diamond; the man was later rescued, but the woman remained missing.
- The 2013 Southwest China floods.
- The 2013 Afghanistan–Pakistan floods.
- 2013 Colorado floods. At least four dead after floods in Colorado.
- On 18 November 2013 the heavy flood caused by Cyclone Cleopatra killed 18 people in the Italian island of Sardinia.

===== 2014 =====
- Many parts of the United Kingdom experienced flooding at the start of this year. In January and then again in February the River Thames breached its banks resulting in severe flooding to many homes and properties in heavily populated parts of the Thames Valley area.
- In early April 2014, Cyclone Ita caused disastrous flooding across the Solomon Islands, killing at least 21 people.
- Between 2 and 30 April 2014, flood events in the United-States, caused by an important tornado outbreak.
- In May 2014, multiple floods affected a large area of Southeastern Europe. A low-pressure area named "Yvette" brought flooding from 14 to 16 May. Bosnia, Serbia and Romania were hit by the biggest flood in their modern history. Several cities were left behind without fresh water or food.
- In June 2014, a flash flood in the Baghlan province of Afghanistan killed at least 73.
- 2014 Alberta floods — On 18 June 2014 the city of Claresholm, Alberta awoke to find its city streets flooded, and states of emergency were declared for many areas in southern Alberta including the Blood Reserve, Cardston, Claresholm, Coaldale, Crowsnest Pass, Lethbridge County, Medicine Hat, and Willow Creek.
- 2014 India–Pakistan floods- In September 2014, an estimated 557 people died in India and Pakistan as a result of flooding, which was caused by intense rainfall in the area.
- 2014 New York flood — Record setting rainfall creating 60 days of precipitation fell near New York, New York.
- At the end of November 2014, a large part of Morocco was hit by floods

===== 2015 =====
- 2015 Northern Chile floods and mudflow
- 2015 Tbilisi flood
- 2015 Missouri floods
- 2015 Houston – Memorial Day Flood
- 2015 South Indian floods
- 2015 Poland Flood
- 2015 Myanmar Flood

===== 2016 =====
- 2016 São Paulo flood and mudslide
- 2016 Houston Tax Day floods
- 2016 Egypt floods
- 2016 Ethiopia flood
- 2016 European floods
- 2016 Oklahoma floods
- 2016 Maryland flood
- 2016 Niger flood
- 2016 Louisiana floods
- 2016 Johannesburg flood

===== 2017 =====
- 2017 Benue State flooding
- 2017 China floods
- 2017 Southern Thailand floods
- 2017 Peru flood
- 2017 Payson flash floods
- 2017 Quebec floods
- 2017 West Attica floods
- 2017 Hurricane Harvey
- 2017 Hurricane Irma
- 2017 Flood of Chennai in Tamil Nadu

===== 2018 =====
- 2018 East Africa floods
- 2018 Japan floods
- 2018 Kerala floods
- 2018 Vietnam floods
- 2018 North Korean floods
- 2018 European floods
- 2018 Maryland flood
- 2018 Punjab flood

===== 2019 =====
- 2019 Iran floods
  - March 2019 north Iran floods
- 2019 Midwestern U.S. floods
- 2019 South Sulawesi floods
- 2019 Townsville flood
- 2019 Pakistan floods and storms
- May 2019 Houston Flash Flooding
- June 2019 Southern and Southeastern U.S. flooding
- 2019 Indian floods
- Venice floods
- 2019 Israeli flash flood
- 2019 Ubon Ratchathani, Thailand flood
- 2019 England floods
- 2019 Quebec, Ontario and New Brunswick floods
- 2019–2020 Congo River floods

===== 2020 =====
- 2019–2020 Congo River floods
- 2020 Jakarta floods
- 2020 China floods
- 2020 Kyushu floods
- 2020 Nepal floods
- 2020 Brazilian floods and mudslides
- 2019–2020 United Kingdom floods
- Storm Gloria (Spain and France)
- Southeast Kentucky floods of 2020
- 2020 East Africa floods
- 2020 Assam floods
- 2020 Korean floods
- 2020 Afghanistan flood
- 2020 Kerala floods
- 2020 Karachi floods
- 2020 Vidarbha floods
- 2020 African Sahel floods
- 2020 Yemen flood
- 2020 Central Vietnam floods
- 2020 Hyderabad floods
- 2020 Zagreb flash flood
- 2020 North Luwu flash flood

===== 2021 =====
- 2021 Evros floods
- 2021 Uttarakhand floods
- 2021 eastern Australia floods
- 2021 central New Zealand floods
- 2021 European floods
- 2021 Henan floods
- 2021 Oman floods
- 2021 Yalta floods
- 2021 Arizona floods
- 2021 Mumbai floods
- 2021 Lagos floods
- 2021 Hulunbuir dam collapse
- 2021 Maharashtra floods
- 2021 China floods
- 2021 Turkey floods
- 2021 August Japan floods
- 2021 Nuristan floods
- 2021 Afghanistan flood
- 2021 Tennessee floods
- 2021 Niger floods
- 2021 Bosnia and Herzegovina floods
- November 2021 Pacific Northwest floods

===== 2022 =====
- 2022 Petrópolis floods
- 2022 eastern Australia floods
- 2022 Assam floods
- 2022 Bukavu floods
- March 2022 Suriname flooding
- 2022 Montana floods
- 2022 Missouri floods
- 2022 Nigeria floods
- 2022 Kentucky floods
- 2022 Iranian floods
- 2022 China floods
- 2022 Texas floods
- 2022 Mississippi floods
- 2022 Pakistan floods
- January 2022 Montevideo Flood
- 2022 Florida floods
- 2022 South Carolina floods
- 2022 Saudi Arabia floods

===== 2023 =====
- 2022–2023 California floods
- 2023 North India floods
- 2023 South Korea floods
- 2023 Slovenia floods

===== 2024 =====
- 2024 Central Asian floods
- 2024 France floods
- 2024 United Kingdom floods
- 2024 Persian Gulf floods
- 2024 Rio Grande do Sul floods (southern Brazil)
- 2024 Nepal floods
- 2024 Central European floods
- October 2024 Spain floods
- 2024 UAE floods, April 16th

===== 2026 =====
- 2026 Mozambique floods
- 2026 Zimbabwe floods
- 2026 Zona da Mata floods
- 2026 Malawi floods
- 2026 Kenya floods
- 2026 Oman floods
- 2026 Chittagong floods
- 2026 Assam floods
- 2026 Anambra flooding

== Floods by region ==
=== Africa ===
- The 2000 Mozambique flood, caused by heavy rains followed by a cyclone, covered much of the country for three weeks, killing thousands, leaving the country devastated for years afterwards.
- Ethiopia saw one of its worst floods in August 2006.
- The 2005 African floods hit over 14 countries in Africa, affecting 2.5 million people and 250 deaths.
- The 2007 Mozambican flood affected 121,000 people and resulted in between 29 and 40 deaths.
- The 2008 Namibia floods affected 250,000 people, killing 42.
- The 2008 Benin floods affected 150,000 people in Benin.
- The 2009 Angola, Namibia and Zambia floods affected some 445,000 people across three countries and resulted in the deaths of at least 131 people.
- The 2009 West Africa floods affected close to one million people across twelve countries, and caused the deaths of at least 193 people.
- The 2011 in Rwanda of the Nyabugogo River causing 5 deaths and five million Rwandan francs
- The 2010 Rwandan flood of the Mwogo River affected two hundred people across Nyanza district, and causing the loss of six million of Rwandan francs.
- The 2015 Southeast Africa Floods
- The 2015 Accra floods in Ghana affected thousands of people in the city, killing about 200.
- The 2016 Egypt floods
- The 2016–2017 Zimbabwe floods
- The 2018 East Africa floods
- The 2018 Eastern Africa floods
- The 2019–2020 Congo River floods
- The 2021 Niger floods
- The 2022 Nigeria floods
- The 2025 South Africa floods
- The 2026 Angola floods
- The 2026 Kenya floods
- The 2026 Malawi floods
- The 2026 Mozambique floods
- The 2026 Zimbabwe floods

=== Asia ===
==== East Asia ====
===== China =====
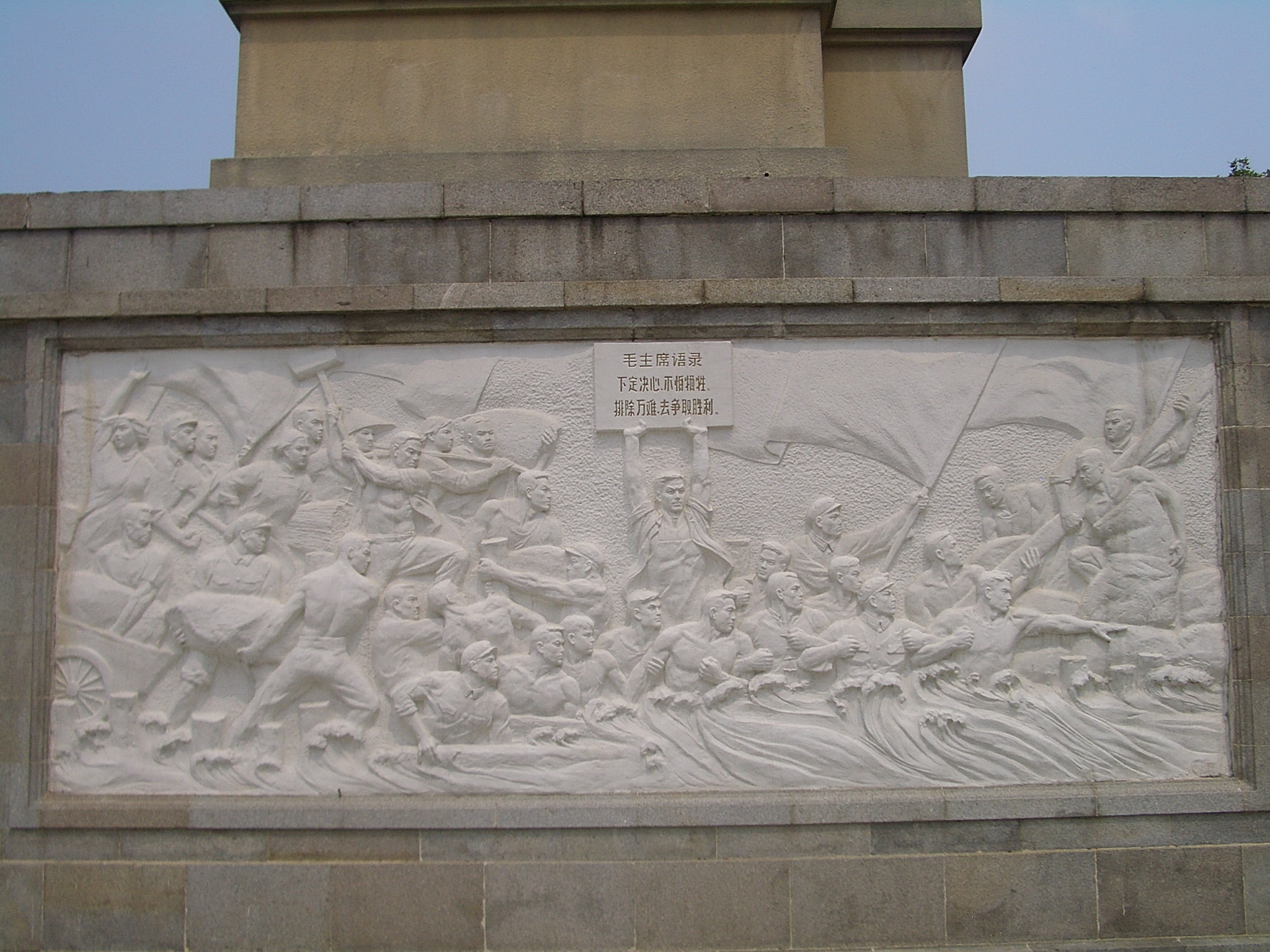
Fighting the 1954 Yangtze Flood, as depicted on a monument in Wuhan

- The 1887 Yellow River Flood caused between 900,000 and 2,0000,000 deaths in China. One of the deadliest floods ever.
- The 1911 Yangtze river flood. Killed up to 100,000 in China
- The 1931 Yellow River flood caused between 800,000 and 4,000,000 deaths in China, one of a series of disastrous floods on the Yellow River.
- The 1935 Yangtze river flood killed 145,000
- The 1939 Tianjin River flood
- 1948 Fuzhou River flood
- 1951 Manchuria River flood
- The 1954 Yangtze River Floods
- The 1983 Yellow River Flood left 900,000~2 million people dead and more than 2 million people homeless.
- The 1998 Yangtze River Floods left 14 million people homeless.
- The 2010 China Floods affected more than 230 million people – with 15.2 million people evacuated and thousands dead.
- 2011 China floods
- The 2013 Southwest China floods.
- On 23 May 2015, at least 57 people were killed in floods in six provinces. Among the dead were two schoolchildren on an overloaded bus that plunged into a pond.
- 2016 China floods
- 2017 China floods
- 2020 China floods
- 2021 China floods
- 2022 China floods

====== Hong Kong, China ======
- Hong Kong Typhoon of 1906
- Great Hong Kong Typhoon of 1937

===== Japan =====
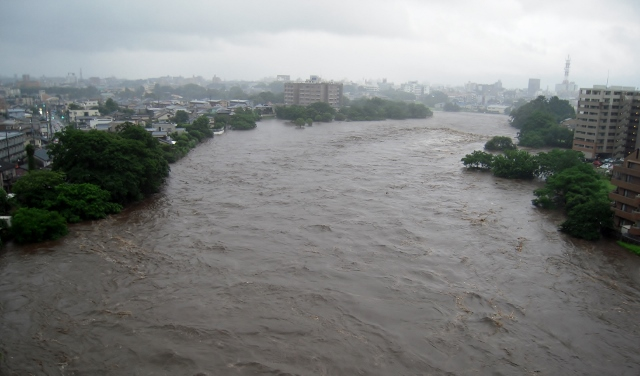
Picture show at heavy rain, following flood in Shira River, Kumamoto, Kyushu, July 2012

- 2021 August Japan floods
- In July 2012, heavy torrential rains caused floods in Kyushu, Japan, leaving 32 people dead or missing. Later in August incessant rains and storm caused floods in Kinki region, causing one casualty.
- In July 1996 a flood hit Central Honshū and 48 people died.
- On 21 September 1996, a typhoon hit Kyushu causing flooding along the coasts as huge waves crashed onshore and flooding onshore when the typhoon dumped much rain on the area.
- In 1953, the 1953 North Kyushu Flood killed 759 people and the killed and missing amounted to 1,001 in the northern area of Kyushu of Japan.
- The 1938 Hanshin flood occurred in July 1938 in Kobe area in Japan, causing 925 lost lives as exceptionally heavy torrential raining caused landslides at Rokko mountain.
- 2018 Japan floods

===== North Korea =====
- North Korea saw one of its worst floods ever in May 2006.

===== South Korea =====
- South Korea was also flooded at the same time but its floods continued through to the end of June 2006.
- 2023 South Korea floods

==== South Asia ====
- In 1993 South Asia Monsoon Floods hit Northern India, Nepal, Pakistan and Bangladesh.

===== Nepal =====
- 2024 Nepal floods
- 2026 Nepal floods

===== Bangladesh =====
- Bangladesh has been victim of numerous floods throughout the years, the major ones being in 1954, 1955, 1970, 1985, 1988, 1998, 2004, 2007 and 2012.

===== India =====
- Assam has been suffering floods regularly since 1998.
- Flooding in Mumbai in July 2005 left over 700 dead. Some areas went under 5 m of water.
- The 2008 Indian floods affected most of India throughout 2008.
- In October 2009, flooding occurred across many parts of South India. It was one of the worst floods in the area in the last 100 years, killing at least 299 people and making 500,000 homeless.
- The Leh floods occurred on 6 August 2010 in Leh, the largest town in Ladakh, a region of the northernmost Indian state of Jammu and Kashmir. At least 193 people are reported to have died, five of whom were foreign tourists, after a cloudburst and heavy overnight rains triggered flash floods and mudslides. A further 200 people were reported missing and thousands more were rendered homeless after the flooding caused extensive damage to property and infrastructure.
- The 2013 North India floods in Uttarakhand which destroyed many things and landslides caused by heavy rainfall.
- The 2014 South India floods in Visakhapatnam which destroyed many things and landslides caused by heavy rainfall and thousands more were rendered homeless after the flooding caused extensive damage to property and infrastructure.
- The 2015 South India Floods in Chennai due to the heavy rain fall of northeast monsoons in 2015 is considered one of the major disasters in the state of Tamil Nadu. It occurred from November end till the mid of second week of December.
- 2017 Gujarat flood
- 2017 South Asian floods
- 2018 Kerala floods
- 2020 South Asian floods
- 2021 Uttarakhand flood
- 2021 Maharashtra floods
- 2022 India–Bangladesh floods
- 2022 Balrampur floods
- 2023 North India floods

===== Pakistan =====
- In 2003, Sindh province was badly affected due to monsoon rains causing damages in billions of places.
- In 2007, Cyclone Yemyin submerged lower part of Balochistan Province in sea water killing 380 people. Before that it killed 213 people in Karachi on its way to Balochistan.
- In 2009, Karachi was flooded. (see 2009 Karachi floods)
- In 2010, from mid-July till mid-August – Pakistan's four provinces (Balochistan, Khyber Pakhtunkhwa and Southern Punjab and Sindh) were badly affected during the monsoon rains when dams, rivers and lakes overflowed, killing at least 1,750 people, injuring 2,500 and affecting 23 million people. The flood is considered the worst in Pakistan's history, affecting people of all four provinces and Asad Jamu and Kashmir Region of Pakistan. (see 2010 Pakistan floods)
- The 2013 Afghanistan–Pakistan floods.
- In 2022 Pakistan suffered the worst flood in the country's history.

==== Southeast Asia ====
- 2014 Southeast Asian floods.

===== Indonesia =====
- 1996 Jakarta flood
- 2006–2007 Southeast Asian floods
- Jakarta suffered floods that killed 80 people on February 2, 2007.
- The Situ Gintung dam in South Tangerang, Banten, failed on 28 March 2009, draining the lake, with resulting floods killing at least 100 people.
- 2010 West Papua floods
- 2011 Tangse flash flood
- 2012 Padang flood
- 2012 Batanguru Timur flash flood
- 2013 South Sulawesi flood
- 2013 Jakarta flood
- 2014 Manado flood
- 2014–2015 floods in Southeast Asia and South Asia
- 2015 Jakarta flood
- 2018 Jakarta flood
- 2019 South Sulawesi floods
- 2019 Jayapura flood and landslide
- 2019 Bengkulu flood and landslide
- Floods in Greater Jakarta (Jabodetabek) on 1–3 January 2020 killed at least 30 people, and more than 31,000 people were evacuated. Floods occur because of rain that occurred from 31 December 2019 to 1 January 2020.
- 2020 North Luwu flash flood
- 2024 Sumatra flash floods
- 2024 West Sumatra floods

===== Malaysia =====
- Floods in Peninsular Malaysia, Sabah and Sumatra in December 2006 and January 2007 were considered to be the worst in the area for 100 years, resulting in evacuation of over 100,000 people in the worst-hit state of Johor at its peak.
- The 2010 north Malaysian floods.
- The 2014–2015 Malaysia floods.
- The 2015 East Malaysian floods.

===== Philippines =====
- 1991 Ormoc flood
- 2009 Philippine flood
- 2010–2011 Philippine floods
- 2012 Luzon southwest monsoon floods
- 2016 Philippine southwest monsoon floods
- 2017 Visayas and Mindanao floods
- 2022-2023 Philippine floods

===== Thailand =====
- The 2010 Thailand floods.
- 2011 Thailand floods started from July 2011 until January 2012 resulted in a total of 815 deaths, 13.6 million people affected, 65 provinces were declared flood disaster zones, over 20,000 square kilometers of farmland was damaged and 7 industrial estates was temporarily shut down causing over US$45.7 billion (1.4 trillion Baht) of over all damage.

=== Europe ===
- The North Sea Flood of 1953 caused over 2,000 deaths in the Dutch province of Zeeland and the United Kingdom and led to the construction of the Delta Works and the Thames Barrier.
- The North Sea flood of 1962 killed 318 people and damaged parts of the Netherlands, United Kingdom and Germany, but mainly Hamburg, Germany.
- Record rain across central Europe in August 2005 caused very severe flooding.
- A series of floods in Ireland, Italy and France in 2011 causes several deaths across all three countries.

==== Czech Republic ====
- The 1997 Central European flood affected the Czech Republic, resulting in 50 deaths there and damage estimated at 63 billion CZK.
- The 2002 European floods affected the Czech Republic, where 17 people died and an estimated 73 billion CZK of damage was caused.
- The 2009 European floods affected the Czech Republic, where 13 people died and more than 5.6 billion CZK of damage was caused.
- The 2010 Central European floods caused a state of emergency to be called in the Zlín Region and Moravian-Silesian Region.

==== France ====
- One of France's worst floods of the 20th century occurred in 1910. The end of 1909 and early 1910 saw a period of heavy rain and snow fall over a period of 3 months. The level of the Seine began to rise rapidly from 18 to 20 January, rising to a maximum of 8.62 meters above normal on the 28th. Some 4 billion cubic meters of river water, contaminated with river sediment and municipal sewage, flooded over 5 square kilometers of Paris. There were over 150,000 casualties and over 20,000 buildings flooded.

==== Germany ====
- All Saints' Flood (1304)

Greece

- 2017 Attica floods
- 2021 Evros floods

==== Italy ====
- On 3 November 1844, the Arno river flooded Florence, Tuscany, and the Mugello region, Tuscany.
- On 22 October 1951, there were numerous casualties due to floods in the neighbourhoods of Benevento, Campania.
- On 14 November 1951, the Po river delta was hit by floods; there were 84 casualties and 180,000 people lost their homes.
- From 24 to 28 November 1959, rivers flooded under excess of rainfall causing hundreds people homeless and storm tide destroyed houses in Metaponto. One person death drowned in Policoro. Heavy rainfall caused also landslides in Pisticci.
- On 9 October 1963, the Vajont Dam, near Longarone, Veneto, experienced a landslide into an artificial lake, triggering a seiche wave and a megatsunami; 1,917 people were killed and many towns in the Piave river valley were obliterated.
- On 4 November 1966, the 1966 Flood of the Arno River in Florence, Tuscany, killed 34 people and damaged or destroyed millions of masterpieces of art and rare books in Florence.
- On 18 July 1985, near Tesero, Trentino-Alto Adige/Südtirol, the Val di Stava dam collapsed; an artificial reservoir breached the dam, killing 286 people.
- In the summer 1987, heavy precipitation caused the Valtellina disaster in the Valtellina valley in Lombardy, killing 53 people and inflicting serious damage to infrastructures, landscape, towns and economy.
- On 6 November 1994, the southern part of Piedmont was hit by floods from the Po and Tanaro rivers; there were 70 casualties and 2,226 people lost their homes.
- On 19 June 1996, the areas of Versilia and Garfagnana in Tuscany were hit by flash floods; there were 14 casualties.
- On 5 May 1998, Sarno, Campania, was hit by a flash flood that triggered a mudslide; there were 160 casualties.
- On 9 September 2000, a camping place near Soverato, Calabria, was wiped out by a flash flood; there were twelve casualties and one missing person.
- From 13 to 16 September 2001, there were floods in most of the Po river basin; there were 23 casualties, 11 missing people and 40,000 evacuees.
- On 18 November 2013 the heavey flood caused by Cyclone Cleopatra killed 18 people in Sardinia.

==== Poland ====
- The 1934 flood in Poland was the biggest flood in the history in Poland (then the Second Polish Republic) with 55 people killed.

==== Portugal ====
- In February 2010, severe floods and mudslides hit the Portuguese island of Madeira, killing at least 50.

==== Spain ====
- 13–14 October 1957, in Valencia, torrential rain results in a devastating flood, at least 81 people lose their lives.
- In 1982, the river Jucar (Valencia, Spain) broke the Tous Reservoir causing a flood that killed 30 people.
- 1983 Spanish floods
- 2024 Spanish floods

==== United Kingdom ====
- The North Sea flood of 1953 was one of the most devastating natural disasters ever recorded in the UK.
- The 2015 Great Britain and Ireland floods

===== England =====
- Great Sheffield Flood – Deadliest flood in the history of the UK, caused by the failure of the Dale Dike Reservoir. Affected Sheffield in 1864, 270 dead
- 1928 Thames flood
- Lynmouth flood of 1952 – 34 people were killed, with a further 420 made homeless. Over 100 buildings were destroyed.
- Flooding from snowmelt March 1947 in England including the 1947 Thames flood
- Floods in July and September 1968 in England
- Autumn 2000 flooding in England
- Boscastle flood of 2004 – Boscastle in Cornwall was heavily damaged due to flash floods.
- Eden, Kent, Derwent, Greta and Cocker as well as other Cumbrian Rivers flooded in January 2005 damaging around 2000 properties and causing over £250 million of damage.
- 2007 United Kingdom floods – 6 people killed. Whole country affected, with Yorkshire the worst hit county. Yorkshire suffers many road and rail closures, power cuts and evacuations with Sheffield the worst hit place in the country.
- November 2009 Great Britain and Ireland floods – heavy rain falls on much of the British Isles, but Cumbria worst affected. 2 people killed by the flood
- 2012 Great Britain and Ireland floods
- North Sea flood of 2013
- Winter storms of 2013–2014 in the United Kingdom – A continuous stream of major storms and heavy rain falls primarily on the southern British Isles, Somerset Devon and Cornwall worst affected. Loss of large areas of agricultural land, many flood records broken. Main Railway line to Cornwall severed at Dawlish.

===== Scotland =====
- 2002 Glasgow floods – 200 people immediately evacuated, but the water supply of 140 thousand people was affected.

===== Wales =====
- December 2015 – Flooding of Conwy River.

Llanrwst from the air during December 2015 flooding.

=== North America ===
==== Canada ====
- In May 1950, the Red River, also known as Red River of the North, reached its highest level since 1861 and flooded most of the Red River Valley. Winnipeg, Manitoba, was inundated on 5 May, also known as Good Friday to some residents, and had to be partially evacuated.
- On 15 October 1954, Hurricane Hazel struck Toronto, Ontario, killing 81 people, destroying 20 bridges, and leaving over 2,000 people homeless.
- On 14 July 1987, a series of strong thunderstorms crossed the Island of Montreal, between the noon hour and 2:30 p.m. causing the Montreal Flood of 1987. Over 100 millimetres (3.9 inches) of rain fell during this very short period of time. The sewer systems were overwhelmed by the deluge and the city was paralyzed by the flooded roads. Autoroute 15, a sunken highway also known as the Decarie Expressway, soon filled with water trapping motorists. Some 350,000 houses lost electricity, and tens of thousands had flooded basements. Two people died, one in a submerged car and another who was electrocuted.
- On 19 July 1996 The worst flood in the Quebec province, in Saguenay-Lac-St-Jean
- One of Canada's most devastating floods occurred in southern Alberta in June 2005. The flooding affected many major metropolitan areas including Calgary. Four deaths resulted from the three-week flood.
- 2013 Alberta floods — On 20 June 2013, widespread flooding in southern Alberta caused major damage in Canmore, Calgary and High River when the Cougar Creek, Highwood River, and other rivers and creeks overflowed caused by extensive rainfall. Other communities in the area were also affected, or were expected to be, by floods. Flooding also caused power outages and the closure of the Trans-Canada Highway and Highway 1A, as well as many other highways and roads. A man and a woman were reported missing after a mobile home was swept into the Highwood River near the town of Black Diamond; the man was later rescued, but the woman remained missing.
- 2014 Alberta floods — On 18 June 2014 the city of Claresholm, Alberta awoke to find its city streets flooded, and states of emergency were declared for many areas in southern Alberta including the Blood Reserve, Cardston, Claresholm, Coaldale, Crowsnest Pass, Lethbridge County, Medicine Hat, and Willow Creek.

==== United States ====
- In 1889, the South Fork Dam broke, causing the massive Johnstown Flood that took 2,209 lives in Johnstown, Pennsylvania.
- The Great Dayton Flood of 1913 killed 360 people and destroyed 20,000 homes in the United States. It also damaged historic photographic plates belonging to Wilbur and Orville Wright. It caused the end of canal transportation in Ohio.
- The 1916 Hatfield Flood of San Diego, California, destroyed the Sweetwater and Lower Otay Dams, and caused 22 deaths and $4.5 million in damages.
- The Vermont flood of 1927 is probably the worst flood in Vermont history doing $30 million in damages, which would be $270 million today, killed over 83 people and left 9,000 homeless.
- The Great Mississippi Flood of 1927 was one of the most destructive floods in United States history.
- The Ohio River flood of 1937 took place in late January and February 1937. With damage stretching from Pittsburgh to Cairo, Illinois, one million were left homeless, with 385 dead and property losses reaching $500 million.
- In 1957, storm surge flooding from Hurricane Audrey killed about 400 people in southwest Louisiana.
- In 1965, Hurricane Betsy flooded large areas of New Orleans, Louisiana, for up to 10 days, drowning around 40 people.
- In 1972, the Black Hills flood killed 238 people and caused $160 million of damage in western South Dakota.
- In 1983, the Pacific Northwest saw one of their worst winter floods, And some of the Northwest states saw their wettest winter yet. The damage was estimated at $1.1 billion.
- In Alaska from May to September 1992 unusually wet conditions, plus snow melt, caused the 100 year flood in areas of Alaska.
- The Great Flood of 1993 was one of the most destructive floods in United States history.
- On 8 May 1995, a flood hit Louisiana and caused extensive damage.
- The Truckee River overflowed on January 1, 1997, causing extensive flooding in Reno, Nevada.
- The Red River Flood of 1997 occurred in April and May 1997 along the Red River of the North in North Dakota, Minnesota, and Manitoba (Canada). It was the most severe flooding of the river since 1826.
- In October 1998, San Marcos, Texas, experienced flooding that had rain totals of 15 to 30 inches in a short period of time.
- In June 2001, floods from Tropical Storm Allison killed over 30 people in the Houston, Texas, area.
- Eighty percent of New Orleans, Louisiana, was flooded due to the failure of several floodwalls on 29 August 2005 in the aftermath of Hurricane Katrina. 1,833 people also died because of the hurricane.
- The Mid-Atlantic States flood of 2006 in the eastern United States is considered to be the worst in that region since the flooding caused by Hurricane David in 1979.
- The May 2010 Tennessee floods were 1,000-year floods in Middle Tennessee, West Tennessee, South Central and Western Kentucky and northern Mississippi as the result of torrential rains on 1 and 2 May 2010. The Cumberland River crested at 51.86 feet in Nashville, a level not seen since 1937.
- 2013 Colorado floods
- Between 27 and 30 April 2014, flood events in Arkansas/Missouri and Mobile–Pensacola, caused by an important tornado outbreak.
- 2014 New York flood — Record setting rainfall creating 60 days of precipitation fell near New York, New York.
- 2015 Missouri flood
- 2016 Oklahoma floods
- 2016 Louisiana floods
- 2017 Texas floods
- 2018 Hawaii floods
- 2018 Carolinas floods
- Mississippi River Floods of 2019
- 2019 Midwestern U.S. floods
- March 2021 Nashville floods
- March 2021 Hawaii floods
- 2021 Tennessee floods
- September 2021 Northeastern United States floods
- 2022 Montana floods
- July–August 2022 United States floods
- 2022–2023 California floods
- July 2023 Northeastern United States floods
- July 2023 Western Kentucky floods
- August 2023 mid-south U.S. floods
- September 2023 New York floods
- December 2023 Eastern United States floods
- July 2024 Illinois floods
- November 2024 Missouri floods
- February 2025 California and Ohio Valley floods
- July 2025 Central Texas floods.
- 2025 Pacific Northwest floods
- 2025 Milwaukee area floods
- 2026 Indiana floods

=== Oceania ===
==== Australia ====
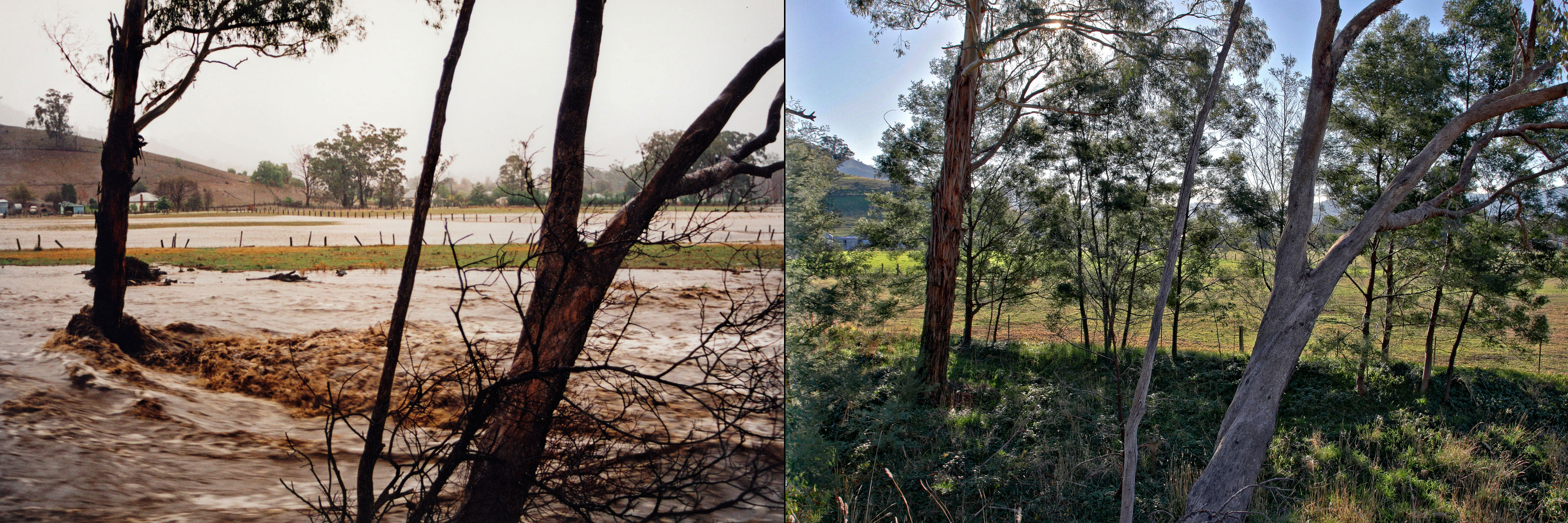
On the left is a photo taken during the 1998 floods in Swifts Creek in Australia. On the right is the same location 8 years later

- 1893 Brisbane flood
- 1940 saw severe floods in Queensland, Australia.
- The Hunter Valley floods of 1955 in New South Wales (Australia) destroyed over 100 homes and caused 45,000 to be evacuated.
- Floods hit Victoria in 1998 causing considerable damage and flooding in the Australian capital, Canberra.
- The 2007 Hunter Floods inundated large areas of the cities of Maitland and Newcastle, in June 2007 claimed 11 lives and forced the evacuation of 4,000 people in Central Maitland alone.
- The Gulf floods caused by Cyclone Charlotte isolated Karumba and Normanton with flood waters in January 2009.
- Flooding in Queensland in 2010 and 2011 was one of the worst flood events in Australia's history, 38 people were killed and entire towns, such as Grantham were severely damaged.
- Severe floods also occurred in Victoria in the years of 2010–2011.
- In January 2013, areas hit by flooding just a few years before were inundated again due to rain caused by Cyclone Oswald.
- 2022 eastern Australia floods
- 2025 New South Wales floods

==== Fiji ====
- The January 2009 Fiji floods are responsible for at least 16 deaths in the islands
- The January 2012 Fiji floods displaced 4,561 people, killed at least 8, and led to an outbreak of Leptospirosis
- Further flooding in March 2012 displaced another 15,000 people

==== New Zealand ====
- The 1858 Hutt River flood kills 14 people
- The 1878 of the Clutha River
- The 1897 flooding at Clive in Hawke's Bay kills 12 people
- The 1929 New Zealand cyclone caused severe flooding in the city of Dunedin
- In 1938, a flash-flood at a railway workers' camp at Kopuawhara kills 21 people
- The 1978 flood of the Clutha River, known as the "Hundred years flood" hit one day before the 100th anniversary of the great flood of 1878
- The 1984 Southland flood
- In 1988, extensive flooding is caused in several parts of the North Island due to Cyclone Bola
- The 2004 Manawatu flood inundated the town of Feilding

==== Solomon Islands ====
- On early April 2014, the Cyclone Ita caused disastrous flooding across the Solomon Islands, killing at least 21 people.

==== Papua New Guinea ====
- In November 2007, Cyclone Guba, a slow moving storm caused deadly flooding in Papua New Guinea.

=== South America ===
==== Brazil ====
- In January 1992, Brazil saw severe floods.
- 2008 Santa Catarina floods
- 2009 Brazilian floods and mudslides
- January 2010 Rio de Janeiro floods and mudslides
- Rio de Janeiro had its worst ever flood that killed over 250 people in April 2010.
- 2010 Northeastern Brazil floods
- The floods of January 2011 in Brazil were considered the worst in the country's history. As of 18 January, the floods had taken about 700 lives and 14,000 people were homeless mainly due to landslides.
- 2016 São Paulo flood and mudslide
- The 2024 Rio Grande do Sul floods, considered to be the country's worst flooding in over 80 years.

==== Chile ====
- The Great Chilean earthquake was followed by a tsunami that flooded the settlements of Riñihue, Los Lagos, Antilhue, Pishuinco and Valdivia
- The 2015 Northern Chile floods and mudflow

==== Peru ====
- The 2017 Peru flood was a natural disaster in Peru in which more than 100 000 homes were demolished, over 100 bridges washed out, and multiple roadways rendered inoperable. Over 70 people have lost their lives as a result of the flooding.

==== Uruguay ====
- The 1959 flood in Uruguay was provoked by an overflow in the Río Negro. The consequences were disastrous for an already stagnant economy.

== Deadliest floods by year ==
=== 21st century ===
- 2001 - 2001 Southeastern United States floods - 55 dead
- 2002 - 2002 European floods - 232 dead
- 2003 - 2003 Santa Fe flood - 154 dead
- 2004 - May 2004 Caribbean floods - 2,000 dead
- 2005 - 2005 Maharashtra floods - 1,094 dead
- 2006 - 2006 North Korean floods - 54,700 dead
- 2007 - 2007 South Asian floods - 2,000 dead
- 2008 - 2008 Indian floods - 2,400+ dead
- 2009 - 2009 Indian floods - 299 dead
- 2010 - 2010 China floods - 4,245 dead or missing
- 2011 - 2011 Southeast Asian floods - 2,828 dead
- 2012 - 2012 Pakistan floods - 455 dead
- 2013 - 2013 North India floods - 6,054 dead
- 2014 - 2014 Baghlan floods - 400 dead or missing
- 2015 - 2015 South India floods - 506 dead
- 2016 - 2016 North Korean floods - 525 dead
- 2017 - 2017 South Asian floods - 1,300 dead
- 2018 - 2018 Laos floods - 1,171 dead or missing.
- 2019 - 2019 Indian floods - 1,600 dead
- 2020 - 2020 South Asian floods - 6,511 dead
- 2021 - 2021 South Asian floods - 1,107 dead
- 2022 - 2022 South Asian floods - 4,422 dead
- 2023 - 2023 Derna flood - At least 6000 dead
- 2024 - 2024 Nigeria floods - At least 415+ dead

== See also ==
- Floods by country
- Floods in Germany
- Floods in China
- Floods in the United States before 1901
- Floods in the United States: 1901–2000
- Floods in the United States: 2001–present
- List of droughts
- List of flash floods
