= Congolese Red Cross =

Congolese Red Cross may refer to:

- Red Cross of the Democratic Republic of the Congo
- Congolese Red Cross (Republic of the Congo), see 2019–2020 Congo River floods
