= 2009 El Salvador floods and mudslides =

Natural disaster in 2009

Meteorological history
- Duration: 7–8 November 2009

Overall effects
- Fatalities: 199 total
- Damage: $239 million (2009 USD)
- Areas affected: El Salvador

The 2009 El Salvador floods and mudslides occurred November 6–9 affecting areas including San Salvador, La Paz, Cuscatlan, Usulutan and San Vicente. The disaster was triggered by a low-pressure system from the Pacific, and flooding from heavy rains caused mud and rock slides that killed approximately 130 people and left 60 missing.

== Meteorological history ==
In early November, an area of low pressure formed in the Pacific Ocean west of Central America. The low pressure system in the Pacific moved closer to the coasts of El Salvador and Guatemala triggering light to moderate rainfalls beginning on November 6 and continuing through November 7. 355 mm of rain accumulated in 24 hours, and the total amount of rainfall reached approximately 483 mm near the Saint Vincent Volcano and between 75 mm and 350 mm in other parts of the country.

== Damage ==
A total of 108 landslides occurred causing 209 buildings to be destroyed and damaging 1,835 more. The floods and mudslides accounted for 130 deaths and 60 people missing. The most affected regions were La Libertad, San Salvador, San Vicente, Cuscatlan and La Paz. Verapaz was also heavily affected by a landslide from the Chichontepec volcano which damaged 300 homes. Several rivers rose above flood levels, and 18 bridges were affected. The United Nations World Food Programme reported the floods washed entire harvests and up to 10,000 people were in need of food assistance.

== See also ==
- 2009 Brazilian floods and mudslides
- 2009 Messina floods and mudslides
