= 1938 Hanshin flood =

Natural disaster in Japan

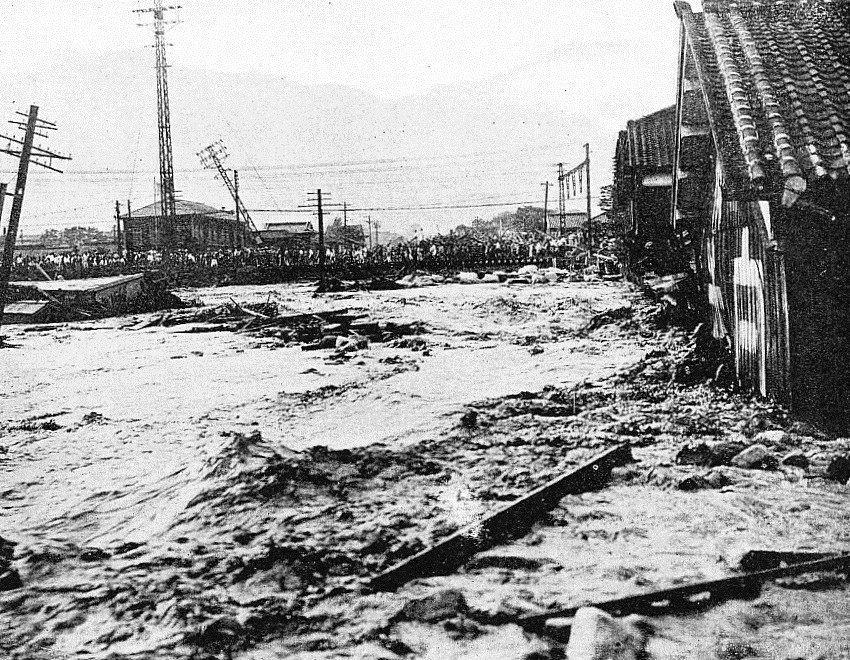
1938 Hanshin flood damage at Sannomiya

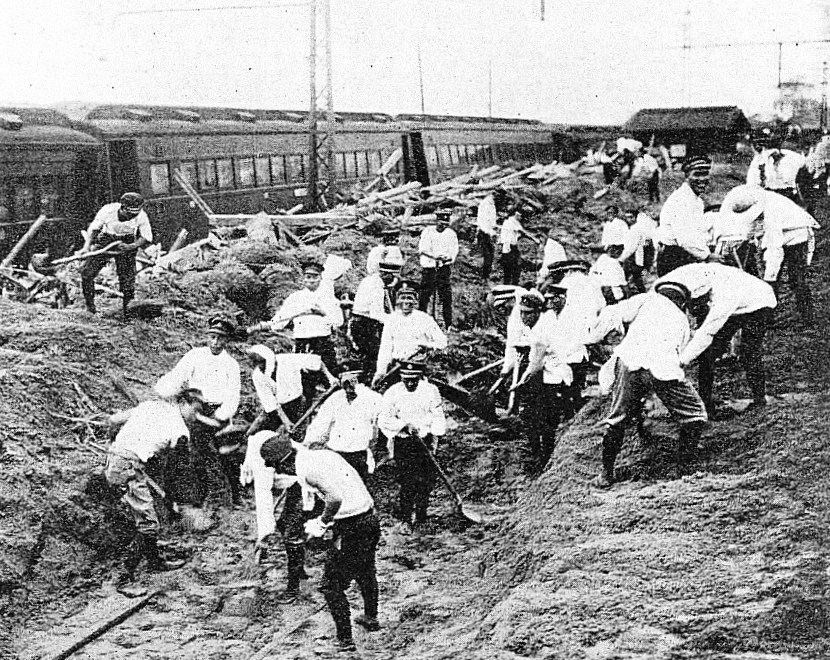
1938 Hanshin flood damage at Ashiya

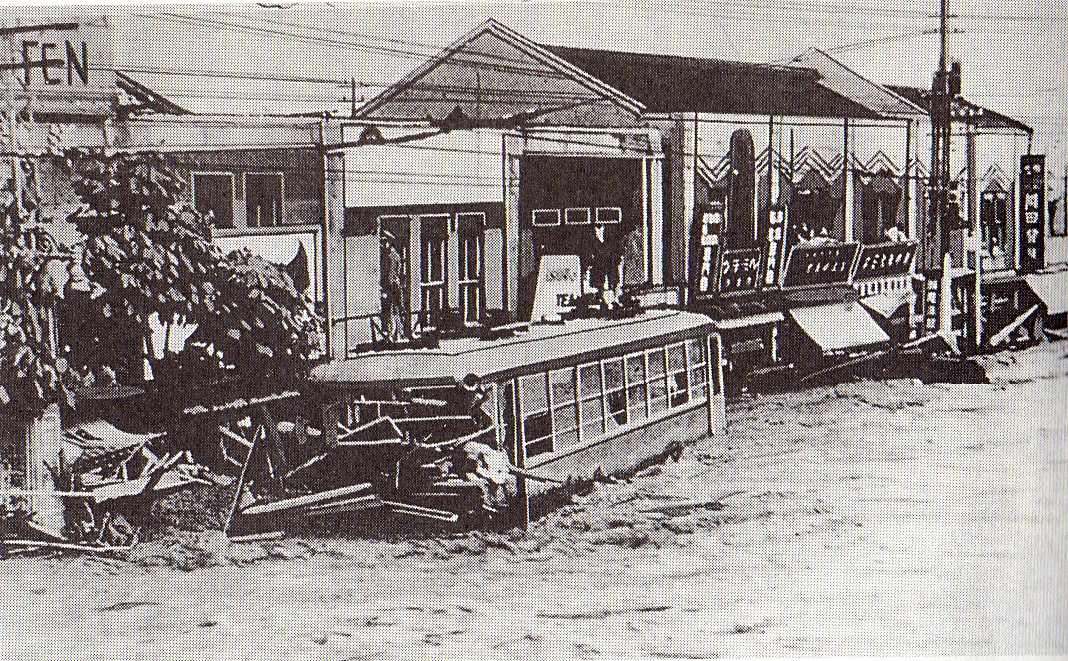
Kobe city tramway damaged by Hanshin flood

The 1938 Hanshin flood (Japanese: 阪神大水害) was caused by heavy rains, which resulted in landslides and floods in the Mount Rokkō area, Hyōgo Prefecture in Japan in July 1938. According to the official government report, torrential rains resulted in flash floods and debris flows that affected the Mount Rokko area, including Kobe and Nishinomiya. At least 715 people lost their lives. The floods feature in Junichirō Tanizaki's novel The Makioka Sisters.

== See also ==
- Great Hanshin earthquake (1995)
- List of floods
