= 2026 Oman floods =

Natural disaster in Oman

- Date: 20–30 March 2026
- Location: Oman
- Cause: Heavy rainfall
- Deaths: 10
- Injuries: Multiple
- Missing: 1

In March 2026, flash flooding caused by heavy rainfall affected parts of Oman, which killed 10 people with 1 missing.

== Background ==
Floods have occurred repeatedly in Oman since 1977, recorded in Muscat's Wadi Adai region. Over 50 significant flood events have affected the country. The National Centre for Statistics and Information (NCSI) reports increased frequency and severity over the past 20 years. Wadis like Wadi Adai, Wadi Kabir, and Wadi Dayqah which flow through the populated areas have caused flooding.

== Flooding ==
Heavy rainfall began on 20 March, which triggered flash floods across northern Oman. The incident came as Oman faced a powerful low-pressure system, bringing rain, thunderstorms, and wind speeds of up to 155 km/h across several governorates. Overflowing wadis were also a cause of violent flash floods that swept away multiple vehicles, disrupted transport, and submerged low-lying areas.

On 22 March, four people were fatally injured, two in the Wilayat of Barka in the Al Batinah South Governorate, while search operations later confirmed the deaths of the three others.

On 23 March, two children were fatally injured in Barka and Al Maawil in the Al Batinah South Governorate.

On March 25, a women was killed in a flash flood in Khasab.
