= 2016 São Paulo flood and mudslide =

Natural disaster in São Paulo, Brazil

2016 Brazil flood and mudslides
- Location of São Paulo state in Brazil
- Date: 11 March 2016
- Location: São Paulo (state), Brazil
- Deaths: 21+

Intense flooding and mudslides struck São Paulo (city) and São Paulo (state), Brazil, following heavy rain and killed at least 21. The downpour in São Paulo and the surrounding areas set new records for rainfall levels for the month of March and left cities covered in up to a meter of slowly draining mud and flood water. The rain occurred after months of drought.

== Events ==
Beginning on March 10 and continuing until the morning of March 11, torrential rain poured up to 61 mm in Sorocaba, west of São Paulo and up to 87 mm in Mirante de Santana, in the north. The towns of Francisco de Morato and Itepavi were both affected by a landslide that left 13 people dead. The towns of Cajamar and Guarulhos also experienced heavy flooding that led to the deaths of four people. Of the 21 killed, reports state that 18 victims died as a result of the mudslides, while 3 others drowned in the flood. Both travelers and local residents were stranded as roads were covered in water. Also, as a result of the rain, São Paulo's International Airport was forced to close for approximately 6 hours. The downpour also halted commuter train travel for several hours.

== See also ==
- 2009 Brazilian floods and mudslides
- January 2010 Rio de Janeiro floods and mudslides
- January 2011 Rio de Janeiro floods and mudslides
