= 2023 Ulaanbaatar floods =

Natural disaster in Ulaanbaatar, Mongolia

Heavy rainfall in July 2023 resulted in severe flooding across Ulaanbaatar, Mongolia.

== Background ==
Continuous heavy rainfall in the Mongolia's capital city resulted in the overflowing of Tuul River and Selbe River which cross the city. The flood damaged a dam along the Selve River, causing it to flood along its river bank. On 25 July 2023, flood warning was issued by the city government.

== Impact ==
More than 20,000 residents of Ulaanbaatar were displaced and subsequently evacuated to safe places. The flood flooded basements of apartments and trapped cars. Electricity was also cut in some buildings in the capital. Several people died during the disaster.

== Response ==
The Government of Mongolia declared a state of high alert for Ulaanbaatar, citing the rain was the heaviest in the past 50 years. Mongolian Ground Force and civil defense were deployed for rescue efforts. UNICEF and Mongolian Red Cross Society distributed various humanitarian aids to the flood victims. The Ulaanbaatar City Council donated apartments to the families of the deceased or left homeless.

== See also ==
- List of floods
