= 2018 Vietnam floods =

Natural disaster in Vietnam

- Date: 23–25 June; 21 July; 1–3 August; 2 September; 19 November; 25 November; 9-10 December
- Cause: Floods

In 2018, Vietnam faced a series of devastating floods. Starting in June, floods impacted northern regions, claiming 23 lives and causing significant damage to homes and agricultural lands. Tropical Storm Son-Tinh in July exacerbated the situation, resulting in further casualties and widespread destruction of crops and infrastructure. Subsequent floods in August and September continued the cycle of destruction, with landslides and overflowing rivers adding to the toll of lives lost and properties damaged. The year culminated in November and December with Tropical Storm Toraji and Typhoon Usagi, which brought more flooding and destruction to various parts of the country, including central provinces.

== June northern Vietnam floods ==
On 23 June, floods started across the country. The flood waters have receded from the northern mountainous provinces of Lai Chau, Ha Giang and Lao Cai while several towns and villages were inaccessible. 23 people were confirmed dead in the floods: in Lai Chau 16 were killed, 5 in Ha Giang Province while two others in other provinces. An estimated VND530 billion ($23.2 million) of damage was recorded in Lao Cai, Ha Giang and Lai Chau and over 80 houses had been destroyed and over 700 hectares of rice fields damaged.

== Tropical storm Son-Tinh ==
On 21 July, floods triggered by heavy rains hit the northern part of the country after tropical storm Son-Tinh made landfall in northern coastal areas, killing 27 people and wounding 14, while 7 others were declared missing. Also, 17,000 animals were killed, 82,000 hectares of crops were damaged and 5,000 houses were destroyed.

== August northern Vietnam floods ==
On 1 August, two children and a man drowned as new floods has overflowed one bank of the Bui River, engulfed several villages and threaten to submerge parts of Hanoi. On 3 August, floods triggered landslides in Phong Tho, Lai Chau that killed six people, injuring two and leaving five others missing.

== September northern Vietnam floods ==
On 2 September, floods started again across northern provinces of the country. As of 4 September, at least 14 people were confirmed dead, mostly in Thanh Hoa, while four others are declared missing. Also, 375 houses were damaged and 661 cattle killed.

== Tropical Storm Toraji ==
On November 16, a tropical disturbance formed east of Vietnam and strengthened into a tropical-depression. Toraji made landfall on November 18 . Toraji caused flooding in Nha Trang, resulting in 19 dead and a damage of ₫396 billion (US$17.2 million).

== Typhoon Usagi ==
On November 25, Usagi made landfall in Mekong Delta as a severe tropical storm. The typhoon caused flooding in Ho Chi Minh City, Nha Trang and Binh Thuan, killing three people. Losses in Vietnam were at ₫347 billion (US$15 million).

== December central Vietnam floods ==
Torrential rains triggered heavy flooding and landslides in central provinces of Quang Tri, Da Nang, Quang Nam and Quang Ngai causing deaths of at least 7 people. In 24 hours, Da Nang received a record rain level of 635 mm, the highest since 1975.
