= 2020 North Luwu flash flood =

Flash floods in Indonesia

The 2020 North Luwu flash flood was a severe flash flood that occurred in the North Luwu Regency due to heavy rainfall (300-400+ mm) on 13 July 2020. Much of the flooding had occurred within the night of 13 July. Following the flooding, the mayor of North Luwu declared a state of emergency in the affected area for 30 days.

== Damage and casualties ==
The floods dealt significant damage to various types of buildings, including 9 schools, 13 places of worship, three health facilities, and eight government offices. It also damaged 12.8 km (7.9 mi) of roads, nine bridges, two public facilities, 100 meters of water pipes, two dams, a market, and 61 micro-business units were affected. Furthermore, at least 219 hectares of agricultural land and 241 hectares of rice fields were destroyed. Layers of mud; some up to 5 meters thick were present in the entire affected area. 4,390 houses were damaged, affecting at least 15,994.

Local officials reported that the floods left 38 dead, while 40 were still missing.

== See also ==
- 2020 Jakarta floods
