= May 2016 North American storm complex =

- Location: Arkansas, Kansas, Nebraska, Oklahoma, and Texas
- Deaths: Several

The May 2016 United States storm complex was a storm system that triggered a flood in the United States on May 31, 2016, affecting the states of Arkansas, Kansas, Nebraska, Oklahoma, and Texas. The inundation set precipitation records in Texas and Oklahoma. On June 2, 2016, the rising of the Brazos River required evacuations for portions of Brazoria County, Texas. Meteorologists attributed this storm's devastation to the power of the El Niño climate cycle.

== Statewide Disaster Proclamation ==
On June 1, 2016, Texas Governor Greg Abbott issued a statewide Disaster Proclamation in 31 counties, including: Austin, Bandera, Bastrop, Brazoria, Brazos, Burleson, Coleman, Colorado, Erath, Fayette, Fort Bend, Grimes, Hidalgo, Hood, Jasper, Kleberg, Lee, Leon, Liberty, Lubbock, Montgomery, Palo Pinto, Parker, Polk, Robertson, San Jacinto, Tyler, Walker, Waller, Washington and Wharton counties.
