= 2017 Benue State flooding =

Major floods in Nigeria in 2017

- Map of Nigeria
- Date: September 2017
- Location: Benue State, Nigeria
- Cause: Long-term rainfall leading to flash floods and river overflowing
- Property damage: 2,000+ houses destroyed

The 2017 Benue State flooding took place in September 2017 in Benue State, Nigeria. It displaced at least 100,000 people, and damaged more than 2,000 homes.

== Causes ==
Weeks of rainfall led to flash floods, discharges and river overflowing in Benue State in North-central Nigeria. 21 out of 23 local government areas in Benue are affected. Flooding in the area is common due to heavy rains and the Benue River flowing through the area.

== Effects on climate change ==
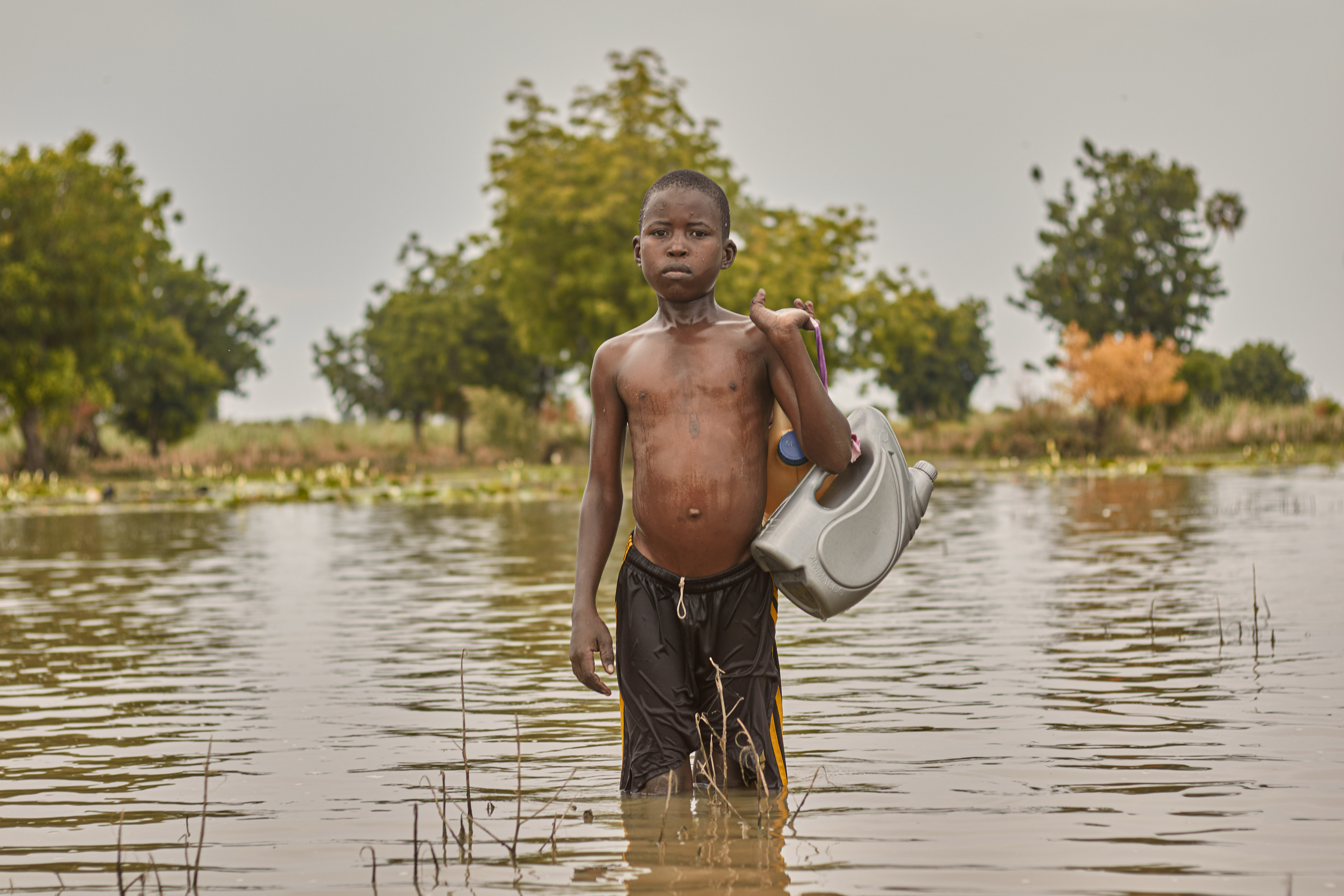
In the mouth of flood

The flooding was similar to the severe one in 2012. The flood submerged two major bridges on River Guma at Tor Kpande and Mande Ortom. Farmlands and food barns were also destroyed in the affected communities. The newly constructed Daudu-Gbajimba, and University of Agriculture Makurdi roads, were not spared as they became impassable after several portions of the roads were washed away by the rising flood waters. Agriculture in Benue faces several challenges which threaten the future of agriculture. Rainfall intensity seemed to be increasing with a gradual reduction. The average discharge at Makurdi hydrological station was 3468.24 m^{3}/s, and the highest peak flow discharge was 16,400 m^{3}/s. The daily maximum temperature and annual average temperature are gradually rising, leading to increased heat. Analysis showed that the soils are moderately fertile but, require the effective application of inorganic and organic fertilisers. The main occupational activities in the area are based on agriculture.

== Flooding in Benue 2024 ==
On 7 May 2024, there was a flooding incident in Makurdi, Benue State, that affected various communities and evacuated many people. The event overwhelmed homes, businesses, and infrastructure. There by causing damages to buildings, social resources and agriculture of the immediate environment.

- Affected areas include Kighir, Idye-Nenger, Zone 4, Wurukum, Wadata, Akpehe, Madonna, Judges Quarters, Gyado-Valla, and Achusa communities.

- The number of people affected has been estimated to be around 2,000.
