= Willow Creek Provincial Park =

Provincial park in Alberta, Canada

Coordinates: 50°07′02″N 113°46′09″W

Willow Creek Provincial Park is a provincial park in Alberta, Canada.

The Wilson Creek Natural Area is an extension of the park. It is located in the Municipal District of Willow Creek No. 26, Alberta, northwest of the Town of Claresholm.

It was established on December 10, 1957.

== See also ==
- List of provincial parks in Alberta
- List of Canadian provincial parks
- List of National Parks of Canada
