= June 2019 Southern and Southeastern U.S. flooding =

Natural disaster in the United States

June 2019 Southern and Southeastern U.S. floods
- Date: First half of June 2019
- Location: Southern United States
- Deaths: 3

The remnants of an earlier tropical disturbance once situated over the Gulf of Mexico brought heavy rainfall and flooding to several states in the Deep South and Southeast during early June 2019. The states worst impacted by this storm were Texas and North Carolina, where over a month of, and in some cases, up to a foot of rain fell at certain locations.

== Meteorological history ==
During late May into early June, a tropical disturbance meandered over Central America and eventually made its way into the Bay of Campeche/Southern Gulf of Mexico. Although it had a moderate to high chance of developing into a tropical depression or tropical storm, it did not and the storm moved into Texas as a non-tropical area of low pressure with the added tropical moisture from the Gulf, fueling localized heavy downpours in severe thunderstorms.

== Impacts ==
=== Texas ===
Along the Gulf Coast of Texas, tropical downpours dumped extremely heavy rain and resulted in flooding, including some urban flooding in Houston.

=== Georgia ===
Ahead of the storm, moderate drought plagued Georgia and surrounding states. The rain reversed these conditions.

=== North Carolina ===
Mayor Lee E Moritz, Jr. of Conover, North Carolina, declared a state of emergency along with Catawba County due to flooding. Near Raleigh, North Carolina, motorists that drove into flooded areas had to be rescued by officials. Three people died in Lincolnton, North Carolina, after their vehicle hydroplaned off the road, hit a tree and overturned into a rising creek.

=== Virginia ===
Several roads in Franklin County have closed due to flash flooding after the area was inundated with 3 to 6 inches of rain.
