= 2026 Malawi floods =

Natural disaster in Malawi

- Date: 2026
- Cause: Heavy rainfall
- Deaths: 40+

In early 2026, floods caused by heavy rainfall affected parts of Malawi, killing dozens of people. Rural areas where agriculture industries are based have been particularly affected. An extimated 160,000 people have been affected by the floods. In a statement signed by Commissioner for Disaster Management Affairs Wilson Moleni, the Department of Disaster Management Affairs (DoDMA) said that the floods have impacted 36,283 households in 29 councils since the rain began. Particularly affected is Chikwawa District in the Southern Region where the basin of the Shire River has flooded. Other districts affected include Balaka, Blantyre City, Blantyre District, Chiradzulu, Chitipa, Dedza, Dowa, Karonga, Kasungu, Lilongwe City, Lilongwe District, Likoma, Machinga, Mangochi, Mchinji, Mulanje, Mzimba, Neno, Nkhata Bay, Nkhotakota, Nsanje, Ntcheu, Ntchisi, Phalombe, Salima, Thyolo, Zomba City and Zomba District. The government's disaster management agency has provided aid and support to those affected. The European Union also announced aid. The Malawi Red Cross provided assistance to 20,000 people in Nkhotakota.
