= 2022 Qinghai floods =

Natural disaster in Qinghai, China

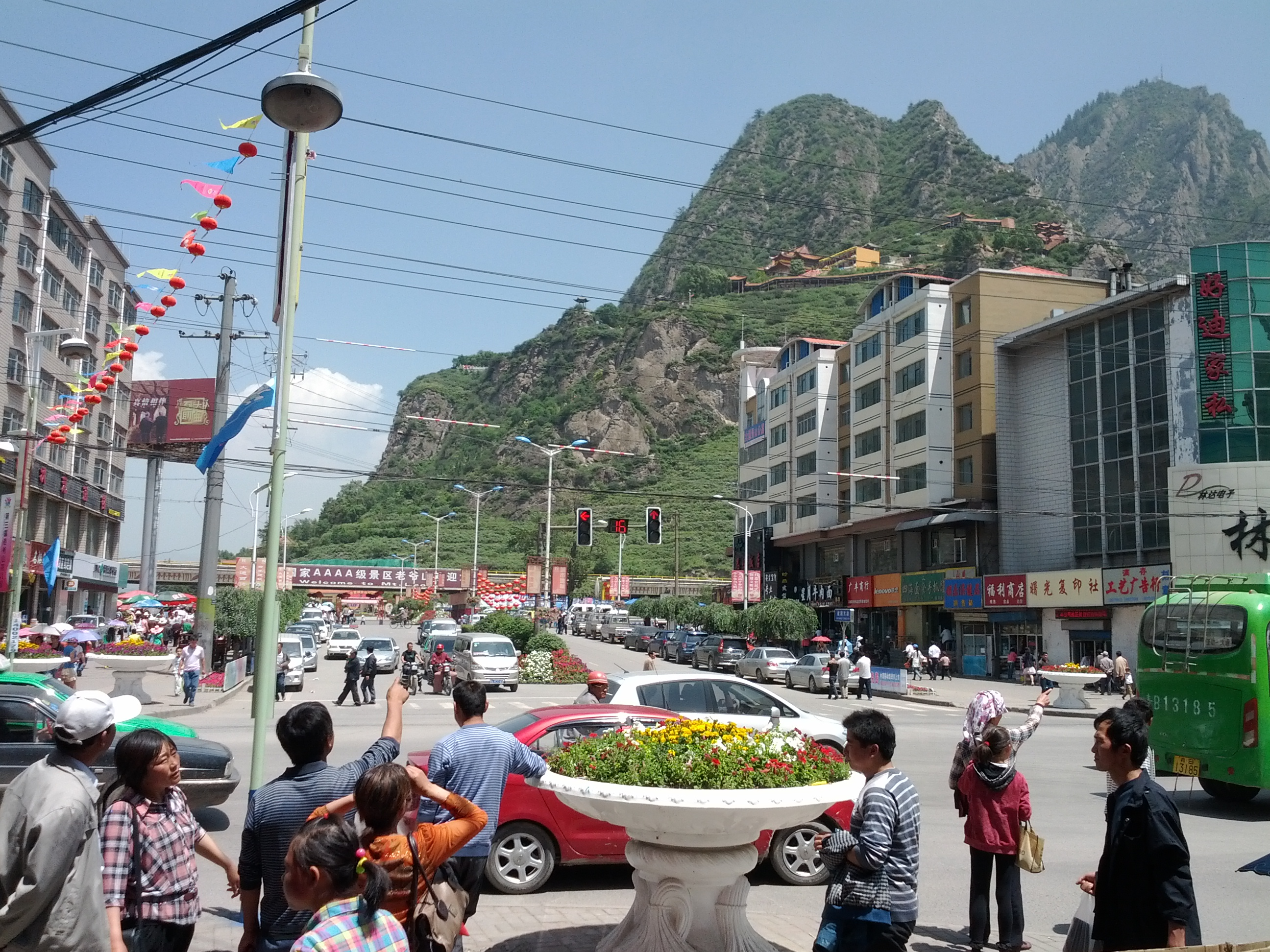
- Mount Laoye from Datong town
- Date: August 2022
- Location: Datong Hui and Tu Autonomous County
- Cause: Rainstorm
- Deaths: 16

In August 2022, flash floods hit Datong Hui and Tu Autonomous County. At least 16 people have been killed and 36 others are missing in Qinghai Province. According to CCTV News, a sudden rainstorm triggered a landslide that diverted a river.
