= 2020 Vidarbha floods =

Natural disaster in Maharashtra, India

2020 Vidarbha Floods
- The Vidarbha region of Maharashtra within India
- Date: August 2020 – September 2020
- Cause: Heavy rainfall

The 2020 Vidarbha Floods were a series of flooding events that occurred in the Vidarbha region of Indian State of Maharashtra in 2020. The floods affected the districts of Nagpur, Bhandara, Chandrapur, Gadchiroli and Gondia. Over 92,000 people were affected in the region.

== Cause ==
The flooding was cased due to excess rainfall at the catchment area of the rivers of Wainganga basin, in the neighbouring state of Madhya Pradesh, forced authorities to open the gates of Chaurai dam in Chhindwara district. On August 28 Central Water commission had released a flood warning. for the region On August 28 and 29, the rivers Pench, Kanhan, Bagh and Wainganga and their numerous tributaries were in their full fury. So were the dams Sanjay Sagar and Gosekhurd (on river Wainganga), Chaurai (on Machchagora), Totladoh-Pench (on Pench), Rajeev Sagar (on Bawanthadi), the Upper Wardha dam (on Wardha) and three reservoirs on river Bagh.

== Aftermath ==
Over 53,000 people were evacuated by eleven rescue and relief teams including the National Disaster response force (NDRF) and State Disaster Response Force (SDRF) and the Indian Army. 88,864 hectares of farmland in 34 talukas of Nagpur division were affected due to floods, while 23,000 houses have also been damaged.
