= 2026 Anambra flooding =

Natural disaster in Nigeria

2026 Anambra flooding was a flooding event that affected parts of Anambra State, Nigeria, particularly Awka and surrounding communities, following heavy rainfall on 22 September 2026. The flooding caused flash floods in several parts of Awka, trapped vehicles carrying schoolchildren and resulted in emergency rescue operations. One of the incidents led to the death of a six-year-old pupil of Nnamdi Azikiwe University (UNIZIK) Primary School.

== Background ==
On 22 September 2026, heavy rainfall lasting several hours caused flooding in parts of Awka, the capital of Anambra State. Several roads and areas were affected by rapidly rising floodwaters, creating dangerous conditions for motorists, pedestrians and residents.

The Anambra State Government had previously issued a flood alert following a forecast by the Nigerian Meteorological Agency (NiMet), which identified Anambra among the states at risk of above-normal flooding. The government advised residents to avoid unnecessary movement during heavy rainfall, take precautions and relocate from flood-prone areas where necessary.

Emergency response agencies, including the Anambra State Fire Service, the State Emergency Management Agency (SEMA) and the National Emergency Management Agency (NEMA), were involved in responding to flooding incidents in Awka.

== Nibo–Isiagu Road incident ==
One of the most serious incidents occurred along the Nibo–Isiagu Road, also known as the Ring Road, in Awka South Local Government Area. A vehicle carrying schoolchildren and adults became trapped in floodwater during the early hours of 22 September.

The Anambra State Police Command said its Safe School Operatives responded to the incident and worked with members of the local community to rescue people trapped by the flood. Seven schoolchildren and two adults were rescued and taken to safety, while one child remained missing.

The missing child was identified as Success Ezenwafor, a six-year-old pupil of UNIZIK Primary School, Awka. He had been travelling to school with other children when the vehicle became trapped and was overwhelmed by floodwater.

A search and rescue operation was subsequently launched involving police officers, community members and other responders. The search continued overnight as authorities attempted to locate the missing pupil.

== Death of Success Ezenwafor ==
Ezenwafor was swept away by floodwater during the incident on 22 September 2026. His body was recovered on the morning of 23 September after an overnight search operation.

Prince Chinedu Okafor, the Chairman of Awka South Local Government Area, confirmed the recovery of the boy's body. The other children and adults rescued from the incident were taken to Chukwuemeka Odumegwu Ojukwu University Teaching Hospital, Amaku, Awka, where they received medical treatment.

According to an account given by a member of Ezenwafor's family and reported by news organisations, the boy broke one of the vehicle's windows during the incident, creating an escape route through which some of the other occupants were able to get out. He was, however, unable to reach safety.

The Ezenwafor family subsequently confirmed his death and said arrangements were being made to move his remains from Amaku to his hometown of Ula, Ekwulobia.

== Response ==
The incident prompted renewed warnings from government officials and emergency authorities about the dangers of travelling through flooded roads and waterways during periods of heavy rainfall.

The Anambra State Government urged residents to heed flood warnings, avoid unnecessary movement during heavy rainfall and relocate from areas at risk of flooding when necessary.

Authorities also urged parents and guardians to keep children away from floodwaters, drainage channels and other potentially dangerous areas during periods of intense rainfall. Residents were advised to report emergencies promptly and to avoid attempting to cross flooded roads or waterways.

The incident also drew attention to the risks faced by schoolchildren and other road users when flash flooding occurs rapidly in urban areas.

== See also ==
- Flooding in Nigeria
- Awka
- Anambra State
- Nnamdi Azikiwe University
