= National Centre for Statistics and Information =

Omani government agency

Agency overview
- Formed: May 26, 2012
- Jurisdiction: Sultanate of Oman
- Agency executive: Khalifa bin Abdullah Al Barwani, Chief Executive Officer

National Centre for Statistics and Information is a government agency in Oman. It was established in 2012 in accordance with the Supreme Council for Planning. It is responsible for the development and sustainability of the Oman economy. It provides statistics to the Sultanate of Oman.
