= 2025–26 Mozambique floods =

Natural disaster in Mozambique in 2026

Meteorological history
- Duration: December 2025 – present

Overall effects
- Fatalities: 146 (as of 30 January 2026)
- Damage: 30,000 homes damaged or destroyed
- Areas affected: Southern Mozambique

Southern Mozambique has been hit by severe flooding that by late January 2026 had left hundreds of thousands of displaced or otherwise affected people. Weeks of heavy rainfall in December and January overwhelmed key reservoirs and swelled rivers, affecting heavily populated areas around the Limpopo and Incomati rivers especially. The flooding has so far affected 600,000-800,000 people and damaged or destroyed 30,000 homes by 27 January 2026, according to Mozambique's National Disasters Management Institute. Some of the hardest-hit cities include Maputo, Xai-Xai, and Chokwe. The disaster is considered the worst flooding in a generation and its severity has led to comparisons to the 1997 Mozambique floods. The state-owned Mozambique Railways (CFM) has lost three million US dollars following the suspension of services on the Limpopo line due to flooding.

== Floods ==
=== December 2025 – February 2026 ===
Flooding began in late December 2025, developing into a hydrological emergency as sustained rainfall saturated river systems. Rainfall coincided with the rainy season's peak, leaving soil saturated. Monitoring

== Response ==
The disaster has caused rescue teams to be mobilized from Brazil, South Africa and the United Kingdom. Portugal also dispatched a military contingent with supplies, experts and money channeled through Instituto Camões to help the beleaguered population. Notwithstanding the heavy weather which has also caused serious damages in Portugal at this time, the Portuguese Secretary of State of Foreign Affairs and Cooperation Ana Xavier has declared that "the Portuguese Government is once more committed to Mozambique and always on the side of the Mozambicans, despite being also focused on managing the bad weather in our country". The Aga Khan Foundation also collected 20 tons of essentials at Lisbon to send to Mozambique. Besides these, the European Union, the United States, Angola, Spain, East Timor, Norway, Japan and neighbouring countries have also sent emergency humanitarian aid to Mozambique.

On the platform Zooniverse, people can help detecting road blockages with satellite imagery in order to help humanitarian organisations access affected regions.

== See also ==
- 1997 Mozambique floods
- 2000 Mozambique flood
- 2007 Mozambican flood
