= 2009 India floods =

Floods that affected various states of India in July 2009

Meteorological history
- Duration: July 2009

Overall effects
- Fatalities: At least 299
- Areas affected: Karnataka, Orissa, Kerala, Andhra Pradesh, Maharashtra

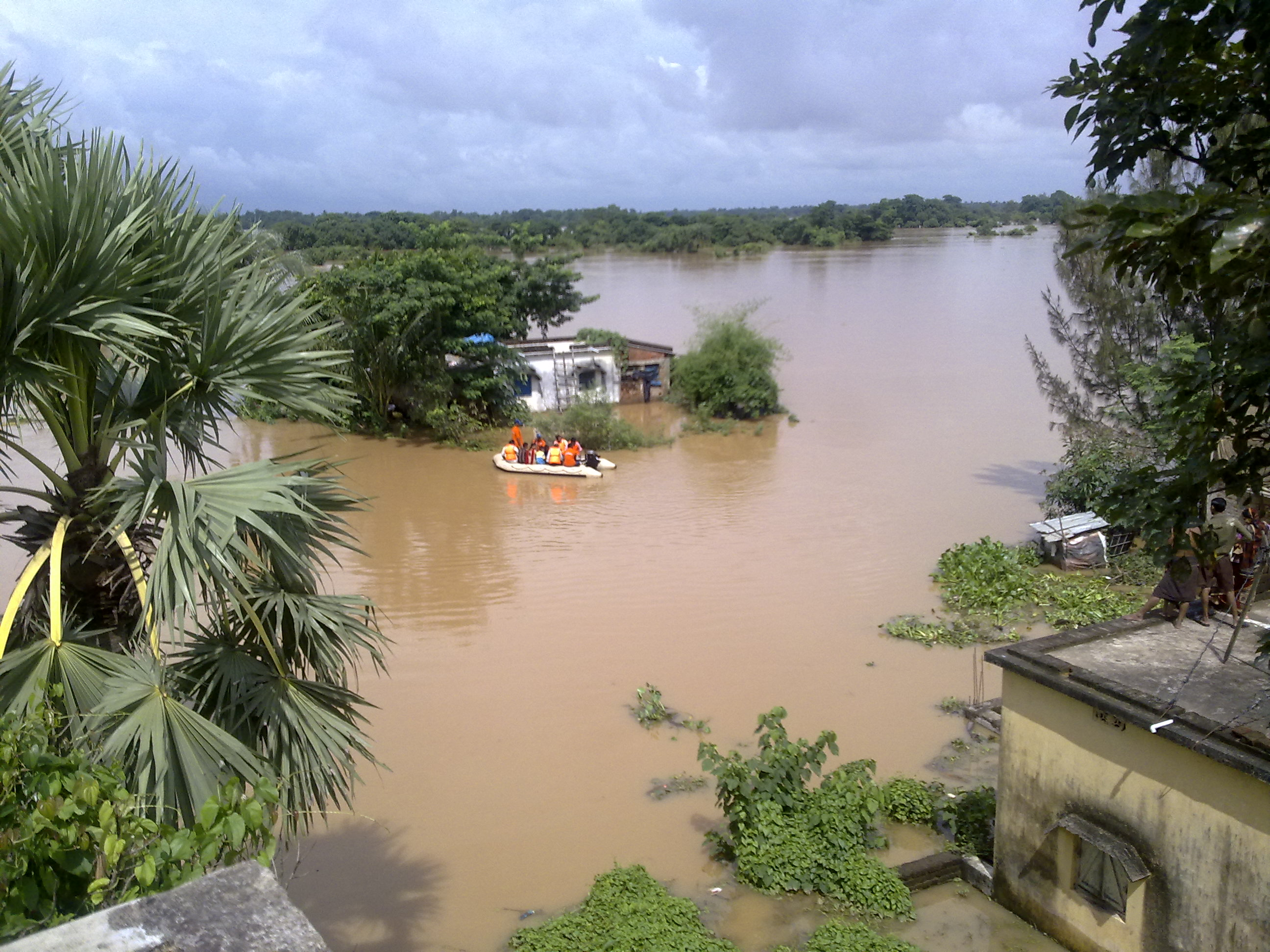
ODRAF Rescue team in action

The 2009 India floods affected various states of India in July 2009, killing at least 36 people in Orissa and 13 in Kerala. The most affected states were Karnataka, Orissa, Kerala, Gujarat and North-East Indian states.

Floods triggered by heavy monsoon rains killed at least 36 people in the eastern Indian state of Orissa alone and inundated half a million homes. On 13 July, seven people were killed and many others missing when a bus fell into a rivulet after being swept away by flood waters in Nayagarh district in Orissa. Nayagarh is 87 km from the Orissa state capital, Bhubaneswar. The world-famous Sun Temple at Konark is also water-logged, causing hardship for tourists. The most flood affected districts in Orissa are Nayagarh, Cuttack, Ganjam, Keonjhar, Koraput and Kandhamal.

Several parts of Kerala were affected with the torrential rains with losses amounting to crores of rupees. At least 13 people in Kerala state are reported dead due to floods in the state. The most affected districts of Kerala are Kannur, Ernakulam, Kozhikode, Kollam Thrissur, Malappuram, Wayanad, Kasaragod and Alappuzha districts. A number of relief camps are opened throughout the state. The Revenue Minister of Kerala state, K. P. Rajendran at Kozhikode has convened a meeting on 20 July 2009 to review the damage caused by rain. District Collectors and officials of the various departments of Kasaragod, Kannur, Wayanad, Kozhikode, Malappuram and Palakkad districts are likely attend the meeting.

Over three lakh people have been hit after incessant rains in Assam and other north eastern states of India.

At least 10 people, including four children and two women, were killed and nine others injured on 27 July 2009 when a wall collapsed due to heavy rains in the satellite township Noida of the national capital of Delhi.

== Losses and damage ==
State	No of deaths reported	Losses ( in Rupees)
Orissa	36	
Kerala	13	
Delhi	10	
Karnataka	178	
Andhra	37	
Maharashtra	25	
