= 2016 Johannesburg flood =

2016 flooding in South Africa

- Date: 9 November 2016
- Location: Johannesburg, Gauteng
- Deaths: 6, with 1 missing

The 2016 Johannesburg flood was a natural disaster in South Africa that took place on 9 November 2016. The flooding, which occurred in the area east of Johannesburg, affected both Johannesburg and Ekurhuleni. The storm and flash floods caused significant damage to the township of Alexandra, while the suburb of Buccleuch was declared a disaster area. The flooding was caused by a significant cloud burst from a convective system.

== Flood event ==
On the afternoon of 9 November, a severe thunderstorm moved across Gauteng bringing with it rain and hail. Unconfirmed reports estimate that between 90 mm and 150 mm of rain fell within an hour leading to flash floods. According to the South African Weather Service, O.R. Tambo International Airport received 89.6mm of rain in approximately three hours. Some of the most destructive flooding occurred on key roads during rush hour traffic as particularly the Witkoppen road and the Linksfield road off- and on-ramps to the N3 (Eastern Bypass) incurred significant damage. By ten o'clock that night 100 vehicles were still stuck in submerged roads, the M1 was still flooded at the Athol Road on- and off-ramps in Melrose, and both the N3 Buccleuch interchange and Linksfield road off- and on-ramps were flooded in both directions. One of the heavily affected routes was the R24 westbound where vehicles were submerged. There was also widespread traffic gridlock with flooding in all directions at Gillooly’s interchange. Access roads to O.R. Tambo International Airport were flooded as was the airport's lower basement parking. An estimated 26 aircraft diversions took place between 17:10 and 18:30, with aircraft diverted to King Shaka International, Lanseria, Wonderboom and Gaborone.

Heavy rain caused the Jukskei River to burst its banks, affecting the R55 in Kyalami where a bridge was covered in debris and blocked off. The suburb of Buccleuch was allegedly declared a state of emergency, Woodmead Drive was closed to traffic as was Tom Jones Road in Benoni. Around 10 cars were pushed down an embankment off the N3. Trains running between Germiston and Kaalfontein were affected by the flooding, while trains from Johannesburg to Pretoria and Tembisa were turning around at Germiston station, and trains from Pretoria and Tembisa were stopping at Kaalfontein. Flooding was reported in Midrand, Edenvale and Bedfordview; while a three-year-old girl was swept away in Alexandra. Housing and cars were also swept away in Alexandra, and the Gauteng Human Settlements Department was providing temporary accommodation while the Province had set up the Johannesburg Disaster Management Centre. A boundary wall collapsed at the Johannesburg Zoo and another wall collapsed in Houghton. According to emergency services, six people died during the flooding. According to the Johannesburg Road Agency, the R55 bridge in Kyalami collapsed, the John Nhlanhla bridge in Alexandra and the Buccleuch bridge washed away, and all low-lying bridges between Kyalami and Dainfern flooded.
