= December 2023 nor'easter =

Storm which affected East Coast of America

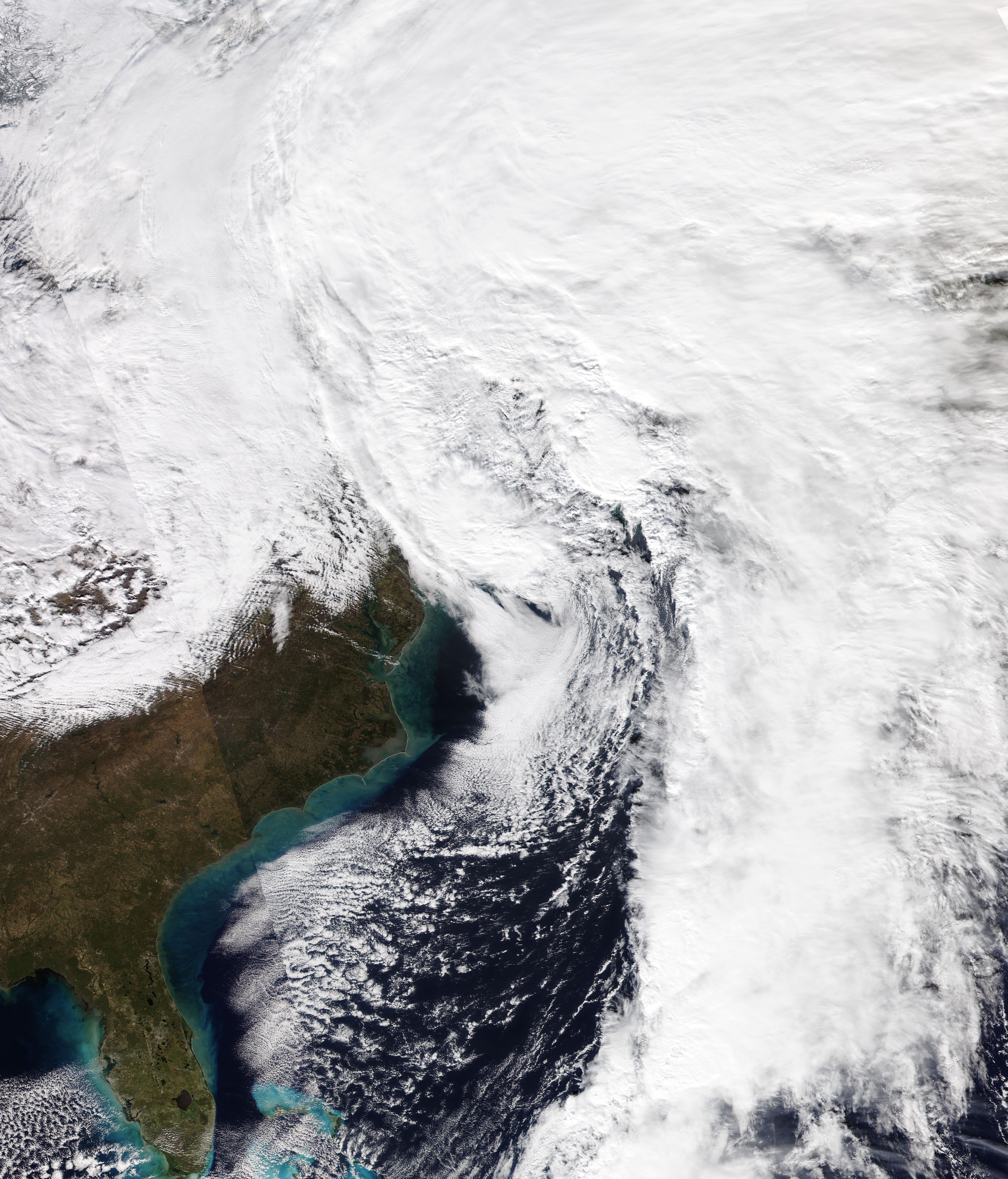

Meteorological history
- Formed: December 16, 2023
- Dissipated: December 18, 2023

Winter storm
- Max. snowfall: 5 in (13 cm) in West Virginia, U.S.

Extratropical cyclone

Tornado outbreak
- Tornadoes: 1
- Max. rating: EF1 tornado

Overall effects
- Fatalities: 4
- Damage: $1.3 billion (2023 USD)
- Areas affected: Southeastern United States, Mid-Atlantic states
- Power outages: >600,000
- Part of the 2023-24 North American winter

A nor'easter occurred in the East Coast of the United States, bringing heavy rain to Florida, Georgia, and other states in the Southeastern United States, as well as the Northeastern United States, during December 2023.

== Meteorological synopsis ==
A stationary front was draped over the Gulf of Mexico and Florida Keys, connected to a cold front extending from the northwestern Bahamas to the area southeast of Bermuda, around December 15. A surface trough was also formed in the southwestern Gulf. By 1205 UTC on December 16, a 1013 millibar low-pressure system had developed in the western Gulf. The low was forecast to deepen in the Gulf as it developed gale-force winds, eventually to a maximum of 45 knots, before moving into Florida by December 17, while a cold front connected to the low would exit the Gulf by early December 17. Two high-pressure systems, one a 1033 mb system over the mid-Atlantic states, and the other being the 1029 mb Bermuda High, would form a gradient with the low-pressure system, which had deepened in intensity to 1009 mb by 1805 UTC, that'd result in high, often gale-force, winds over the seas near Florida. The low deepened further, at 1004 mb by 0605 UTC on December 17th, and being 999 mb by 1205 UTC. The areas north of the system's warm front were the sites of intense convection, and thus hours of heavy rainfall, at times reaching rates of 0.75 inches per hour, resulting in flash flooding in some areas and rain accumulations of anywhere from two to four inches.

The system had moved ashore Florida by 1805 UTC, then over Jacksonville, Florida, as a 996 mb low, with its warm front running from the low to around the southeastern Bahamas.

== Impact ==
The storm resulted in 5200 flight delays and 115 cancellations just on December 17. Damage from the storm totaled $1.3 billion.

=== Southeastern United States ===
On December 16, heavy rainfall affected Central Florida, with all 7 climate sites breaking daily rainfall records. Powerful winds also affected Florida, with a peak gust of 61 mph (98 km/h) in West Palm Beach. Flooding resulted in 11,000 power outages in Florida. The next day, record rain struck the Charleston metropolitan area, South Carolina, with over 3 in (76 mm) of rain. Further north around Myrtle Beach, South Carolina, a flash flood emergency was issued with some areas receiving over 13 in (330 mm) of rain. The storm also brought the 4th highest tide to Charleston Harbor. Property damage in the region was nearly four times that of Hurricane Idalia. A tornado touched down in Horry County, South Carolina during the storm. The storm also resulted in 31,000 power outages in South Carolina, with 14,000 people losing power in North Carolina. A fatality occurred in South Carolina.

=== Northeastern United States ===
The storm moved up the coast from December 17 into the 18th, causing major flooding in the Northeastern United States. In the Northeast, over 400 flights were canceled and 1400 delayed, with a ground stop imposed at Boston Logan International Airport. Over 600,000 customers lost power in the Northeast, and a travel advisory issued in New York City. 300,000 power outages were in Maine alone. The Salisbury Zoo closed due to flooding. The Port Washington Branch of the Long Island Rail Road had a partial suspension, with delays on the New Jersey Transit as well. Further north, all Amtrak service in the state of Vermont was suspended on December 18. High winds also resulted in the Verrazzano–Narrows Bridge closing down. In the state of West Virginia, snowfall up to 5 in (13 cm) fell. Wind gusts reached 90 mph (140 km/h) at the Blue Hill Observatory in Massachusetts. The storm resulted in three fatalities across the region.

== Aftermath ==
Following the storm, the Department of Transportation gave $60,000 to reimburse costs for Moosehorn National Wildlife Refuge, $150,000 to reimburse costs for Rachel Carson National Wildlife Refuge and $220,000 to reimburse costs for Maine Coastal Islands Complex.
