= 2026 Zimbabwe floods =

Natural disaster in Zimbabwe

- Date: 2026
- Cause: Heavy rainfall
- Deaths: 100+

The 2026 Zimbabwe floods were a series of floods and other rain-related disasters that affected Zimbabwe during the 2025–26 rainy season. Heavy rains caused rivers and streams to overflow in several parts of the country, leaving communities cut off, damaging roads and bridges, flooding homes and schools, and causing deaths. There have been reports of 70 deaths and approximately 250,000 people affected.

== Background ==
Zimbabwe's 2025–26 rainy season brought repeated periods of heavy rainfall. As rivers filled and dams reached high levels, several communities faced flooding and dangerous travelling conditions.

The floods did not affect the country in exactly the same way everywhere. Some areas experienced flooded roads and bridges, while others suffered from collapsed houses, overflowing rivers or people becoming trapped by rising water.

Manicaland was among the provinces with the highest number of deaths. By January 30, it had recorded 36 deaths, followed by Mashonaland West with 19 and Matabeleland South with 16. Harare Metropolitan Province, meanwhile, had the highest number of affected households, with 5,093 reported at that time.

== Damage ==
Widespread rains and flash floods continued across Southern Africa since mid-December 2025. On 4 January 2026, heavy rains triggered flooding in the Dumbujena Street, Mbare, New Canaan and Highfield areas of Harare. The Zimbabwe National Water Authority (ZINWA) issued flood warnings. On 13 January 2026, Harare City Council warned residents to leave the central business district. In March 2026, floods swept away the Jeka-Chegato Bridge across the Mwenezi River in Mberengwa North District. The initensity of the floods was linked to climate change. 237 schools have been damaged.
