= 2019–2020 Congo River floods =

2019–2020 floods of the Congo and Ubangi rivers

- Date: October 2019–January 2020
- Location: Democratic Republic of Congo; Republic of Congo; Central African Republic
- Deaths: 41+

The 2019–2020 Congo River floods resulted from torrential rains from October 2019 to January 2020 that caused the overflow of the Congo and Ubangi rivers, floods and landslides throughout the Democratic Republic of Congo (DRC) and Republic of Congo (RoC) and led to the displacement of hundreds of thousands of people.

== Background ==
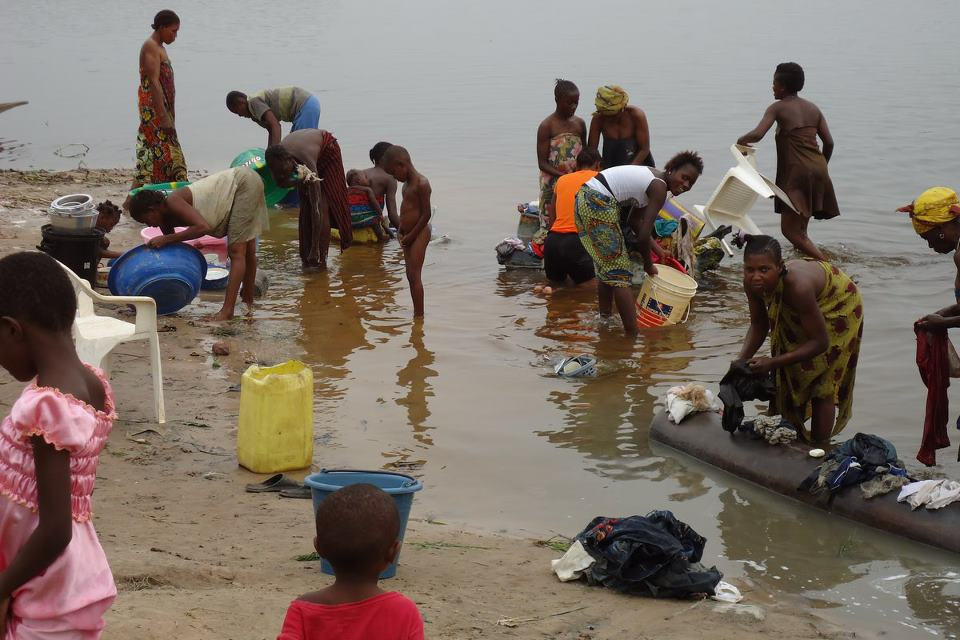
People washing in the Congo River

The DRC and RoC have historically experienced recurrent flooding along the Congo River and its main tributaries during the rainy season, causing erosion and landslides, and negatively impacting human settlements, agriculture, and public health. The Congo River, situated within the Congo Basin, is expected to be increasingly impacted by climate change as temperatures rise and rainfall increases both in intensity and seasonal duration.

== Floods ==
From October 2019 to January 2020, heavy rains affected 16 of the 26 provinces of the DRC and eight out of 12 departments of the RoC. The most affected provinces in the DRC were Nord-Ubangi, Sud-Ubangi, Mongala, Equateur, and Tshopo, and the most affected in the RoC were Likouala, Cuvette, Plateaux and Brazzaville. By December 2019, the Congo carried 70,000 cubic meters of water per second (2.5 million cu ft/s) past Kinshasa, the capital of the DRC.

In January 2020, the flooding resulted in the longest turbidity current ever recorded, when approximately one cubic kilometer (0.24 mi^{3}) of sand and mud descended for 1,100 kilometers (680 mi) underwater over two days, traveling from the mouth of the Congo River, through the Congo Canyon and across the ocean floor. The current damaged two submarine communications cables, slowing internet traffic between Nigeria and South Africa.

== Impact ==
The floods were the most severe to impact the region in the last 20 years. The event has been attributed to climate change; however, it was exacerbated by poor drainage and infrastructure. In the RoC, more than 100 villages were submerged with homes destroyed along the departments of Likouala, Cuvette and Plateaux, impacting around 170,000 of the most vulnerable of the population, of which around 30,000 were refugees. Significant damage occurred in the capital of the RoC, Brazzaville, in January 2020 with heavy rain causing major damage to infrastructure across the city. Around 6,302 hectares (15,570 acres) of farmland were destroyed in the RoC. Government figures in the DRC estimated that over 923,000 people were affected by the flooding, of whom more than 400,000 were displaced. Over 41 people were killed in Kinshasa in November 2019 by flash floods and landslides that destroyed roads, bridges, and hundreds of homes.

== Response ==
On November 19, 2019, the government of the RoC declared a humanitarian disaster and state of emergency in the departments of Likouala, Cuvette and Plateaux, while seeking assistance from the international community. A rapid humanitarian assessment was undertaken by the RoC national government and the United Nations in December 2019. Access problems and minimal operational presence hampered coordination efforts. A UN report suggested the government had limited capacity to deal with the emergency and that there was insufficient human and financial resources to ensure coverage of those affected. The United Nations Emergency Relief Fund was rapidly deployed and local responsibility for coordination was assigned to the RoC's Ministry of Social Affairs and Humanitarian Action.

Numerous local and international organizations responded to the disaster. Local organizations included Civil Protection, an agency of the Ministry of Social Affairs, the Water Hygiene and Sanitation Technical Committee, the Red Cross of the Democratic Republic of the Congo and the Congolese Red Cross. United Nations agencies included the Central Emergency Response Fund (CERF), World Food Program (WFP), United Nations Children's Fund (UNICEF), Food and Agriculture Organisation (FAO), UN Refugee Agency (UNHCR), United Nations Office for the Coordination of Human Affairs (OCHA) and the United Nations Populations Fund (UNFPA). Various organizations also provided financial assistance, including the Red Cross Disaster Relief Emergency Fund Humanitarian Aid Department of the European Commission, Government of Canada Emergency Disaster Assistance Fund and the United States Agency for International Development (USAID).
