= 2009 Brazilian floods and mudslides =

Natural disaster in Brazil

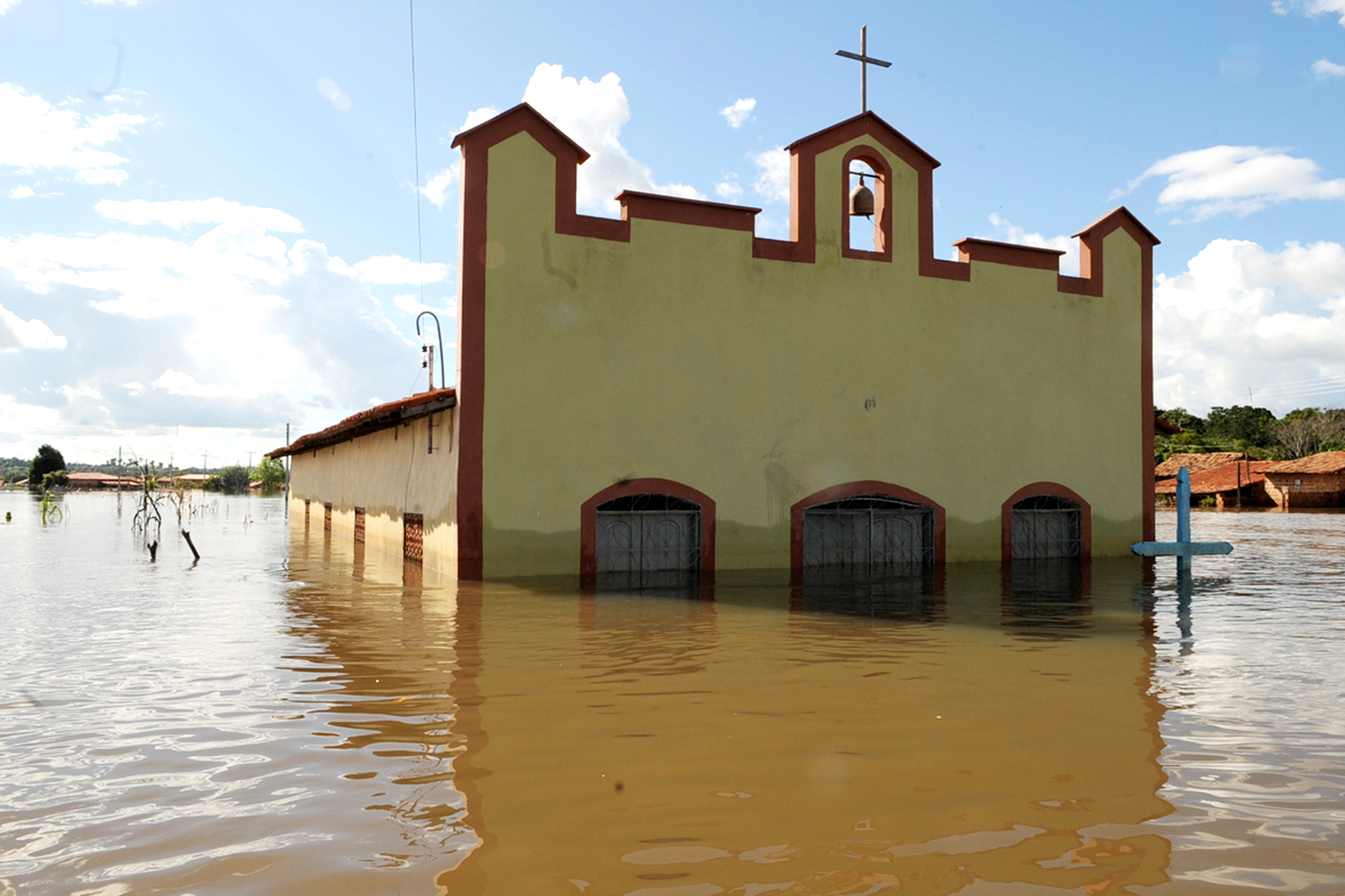
- Flooded church

Meteorological history
- Duration: April–May 2009

Overall effects
- Fatalities: 44
- Damage: Estimates at £1 billion
- Areas affected: Northeastern Brazil

The 2009 Brazilian floods and mudslides were a severe natural disaster principally affecting five northeastern states of Brazil. As a result of heavy rains, fourteen people were reported dead over a period of one month and at least 62,600 others had been left homeless as of 2 May 2009. Nineteen people were dead by 5 May 2009, with a significant increase in homeless people being reported, estimated at 186,000. The death toll by 8 May was thirty-nine and 270,000 people were reported homeless.

The state of Santa Catarina in the South of the country was also been damaged. A total of seven states were affected across the country. Maranhão was the worst affected state, with at least six deaths and at least 40,700 homeless people occupying shelters.

The Amazon River Basin suffered its second-heaviest flood in one hundred years during this period. These are already the worst floods Brazil has experienced in over twenty years.

Reconstruction from the floods and mudslides are expected to take 3–5 years.

== Developments ==
Heavy rain in Brazil began in early April 2009, affecting 40,000 people. 13,000 people were immediately left homeless and there were two quick deaths in Maranhão's state capital, São Luís, both as a result of mudslides. The homeless were half in shelters and half in the care of relatives. Thirteen of the state's municipalities declared a state of emergency.

On 23 April, it was reported that the disaster had already killed three people, including a one-month-old child from Salvador, the capital of Bahia, who was suffocated by a mudslide. Over 33,000 people had been made homeless at that stage; 30,000 of these were in Maranhão and 3,400 were in the adjacent state of Bahia.

At least 3,000 people lost their homes in Santa Catarina, whilst one died. The governor of Amazonas, Eduardo Braga, initiated a state of emergency in every one of his state's sixty-two municipalities. Fourteen people were reported dead within one month and at least 62,600 others were left homeless by 2 May 2009.

Nineteen people were dead by 5 May 2009, as a sharp rise in homelessness occurred. Homeless totals have been estimated at 186,000 individuals. Images of citizens travelling around in boats and barely visible rooftops were broadcast on television. Emergency shelters were said to be "packed" with homeless people. At least six major highways were closed in Maranhão. A railway used to transport iron ore and 1,300 people each day was also shut down. The governor of the state of Piauí declared a state of emergency in nineteen of the state's towns and cities, and requested help from the military in rescuing people from the floods.

By this time, over 186,000 people were homeless. The death toll by 6 May was reported at twenty-nine.

The death toll by 8 May was thirty-nine and 270,000 people were reported homeless.

By 10 May, it was being reported that over 300,000 people were homeless and 44 had been killed.

== Reaction ==
President of Brazil, Luiz Inácio Lula da Silva, inspected the damage by air and brought food to those displaced by the disaster. He commented: "We need to look more seriously into the climate situation these days. Something is changing and we still have time to fix it." (i.e.: Mass De-Forestation?) Brazil's Health Minister José Gomes Temporão had promised to deliver medical supplies to Maranhão.

== See also ==
- 2009 Messina floods and mudslides
- 2009 El Salvador floods and mudslides
- 2010 Northeastern Brazil floods
- 2020 Brazilian floods and mudslides
