= 2017 China floods =

Natural disasters in China

- In June 2017, it had been raining for a week. As the water level rises, some of Orange Isle were submerged.
- Location: Guangxi, Guangdong, Hunan, Hubei, Jiangxi, Jiangsu, Anhui, Zhejiang, Shandong, Shaanxi, Yunnan, Sichuan, Gansu and Henan
- Deaths: 203+ (44 deaths in Ningxiang, Hunan)
- Property damage: US$5.70 billion

The 2017 China floods were floods in China that began in early June 2017. More than 14.9017 million people in 10 provinces and municipalities and regions were affected, especially the southern and central provinces and regions of Guangxi, Guangdong, Hunan, Hubei, Jiangxi, Jiangsu, Anhui, Zhejiang, Shandong, Shaanxi, Yunnan, Sichuan, Gansu and Henan. Hunan was the hardest hit. A total of 18,100 houses were destroyed, and more than 9,821-square-metre (105,710 sq ft) of crops were inundated.

Many major rivers and lakes in China, including the Yangtze River, Zhujiang River, Dongting Lake, Poyang Lake were flooded to danger levels. The State Flood Control and Drought Relief Headquarter said on Sunday, July 2, that water levels in more than 60 rivers in southern China were above the warning levels due to sustained rainfalls in recent days.

== Floods among eight provinces in the summer ==
Since June 29, several regions in South China suffered heavy rainfall. According to the Ministry of Civil Affairs, 9.564 million people from 238 county level administrations are affected, and 48 deaths ending the morning of July 3.

== Flooding by province ==
=== Chongqing ===
The rainfall led to widespread flooding that destroyed the No. 201 Provincial Highway, causing traffic disruption and traffic congestion.

=== Hunan ===
According to the latest data for July 1, 1.159 million people in Hunan were affected. 7 deaths, 1 missing, 9,080-square-metre (97,700 sq ft) of crops affected, 382 homes destroyed and 969 damaged. The direct economic loss about CN¥1.9 billion. Rainstorms lashed 832 towns in southern and eastern Hunan from Saturday morning to Sunday morning, with Huangtang Township in Ningyuan County receiving the most precipitation at 264.2 millimetres (10.40 in) within 24 hours.

By July 2, more than 7 major rivers (Xiangjiang River, Liuyang River, Laodao River, Wei River, Zi River, Yuan River, Qingjiang River) and many more had reached a moderate major, or record flood stage. Four rivers reached record level including Xiangjiang River, Liuyang River, Laodao River and Wei River.

==== Ningxiang ====
In some towns and townships in Ningxiang the power systems and water supply systems have been devastated, and phone line were out. On July 1, a mudslide left 9 dead and 19 injured in Zuta Village (祖塔村) of Weishan Township.

According to the Government of Ningxiang, heavy downpours pounded Ningxiang since June 22, leading to Ningxiang's worst natural disaster in 60 years. The affected population reached 815 thousand, 44 people deaths, 212-square-metre (2,280 sq ft) of crops affected, accounting for 56% of the population in the city, more than 14,000 houses collapsed or partially damaged, more than 900 dams damaged, more than 70 roads damaged, the direct economic loss about CN¥9 billion.

==== Xiangxiang ====
Vice chairman of Xiangxiang Municipal Committee of the Chinese People's Political Consultative Conference (CPPCC), Liu Hequn (刘鹤群), was washed away by the flood.

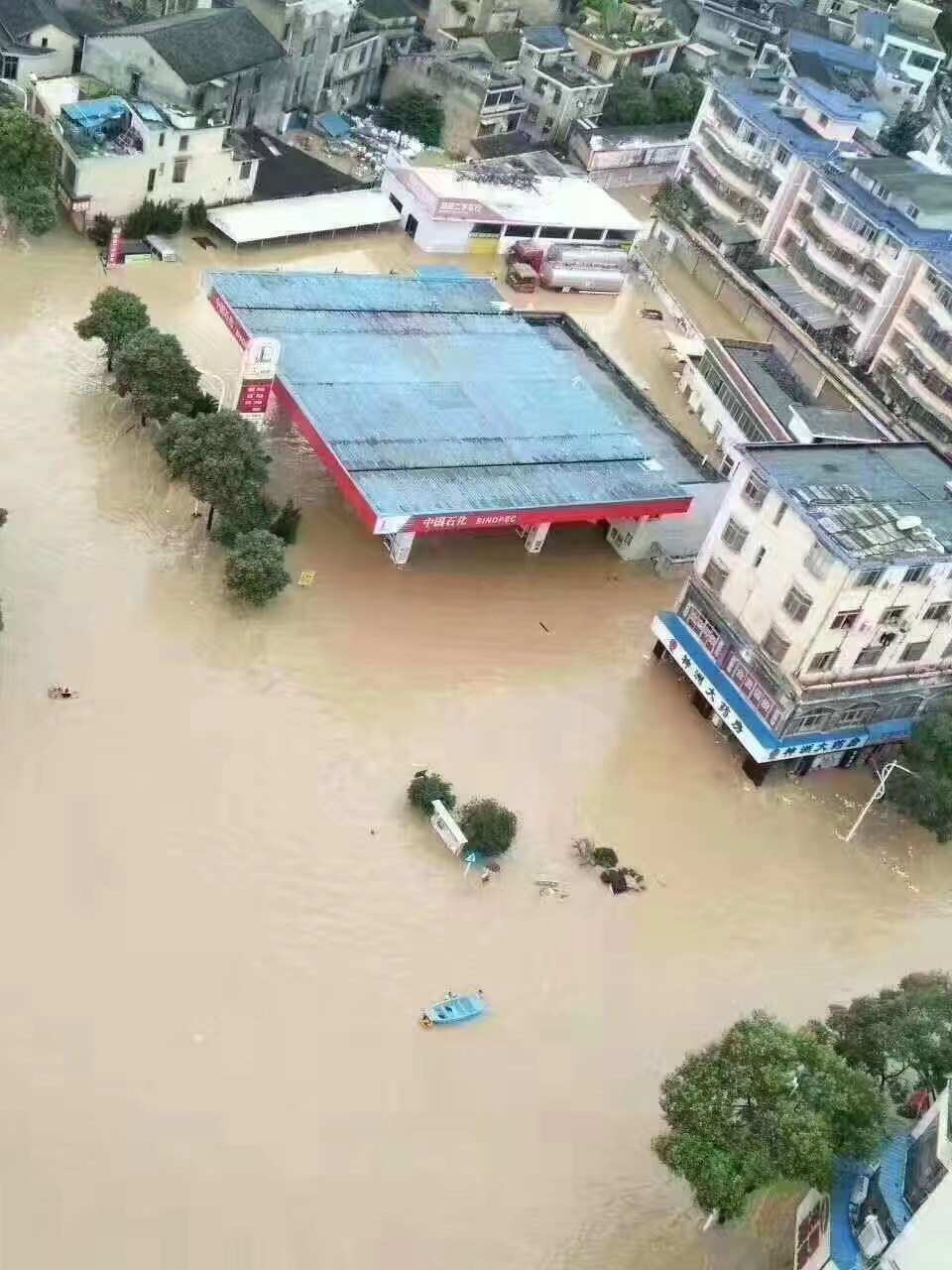
Photo taken on July 2, 2017 shows the flooded area in Changsha, capital of central China's Hunan province.

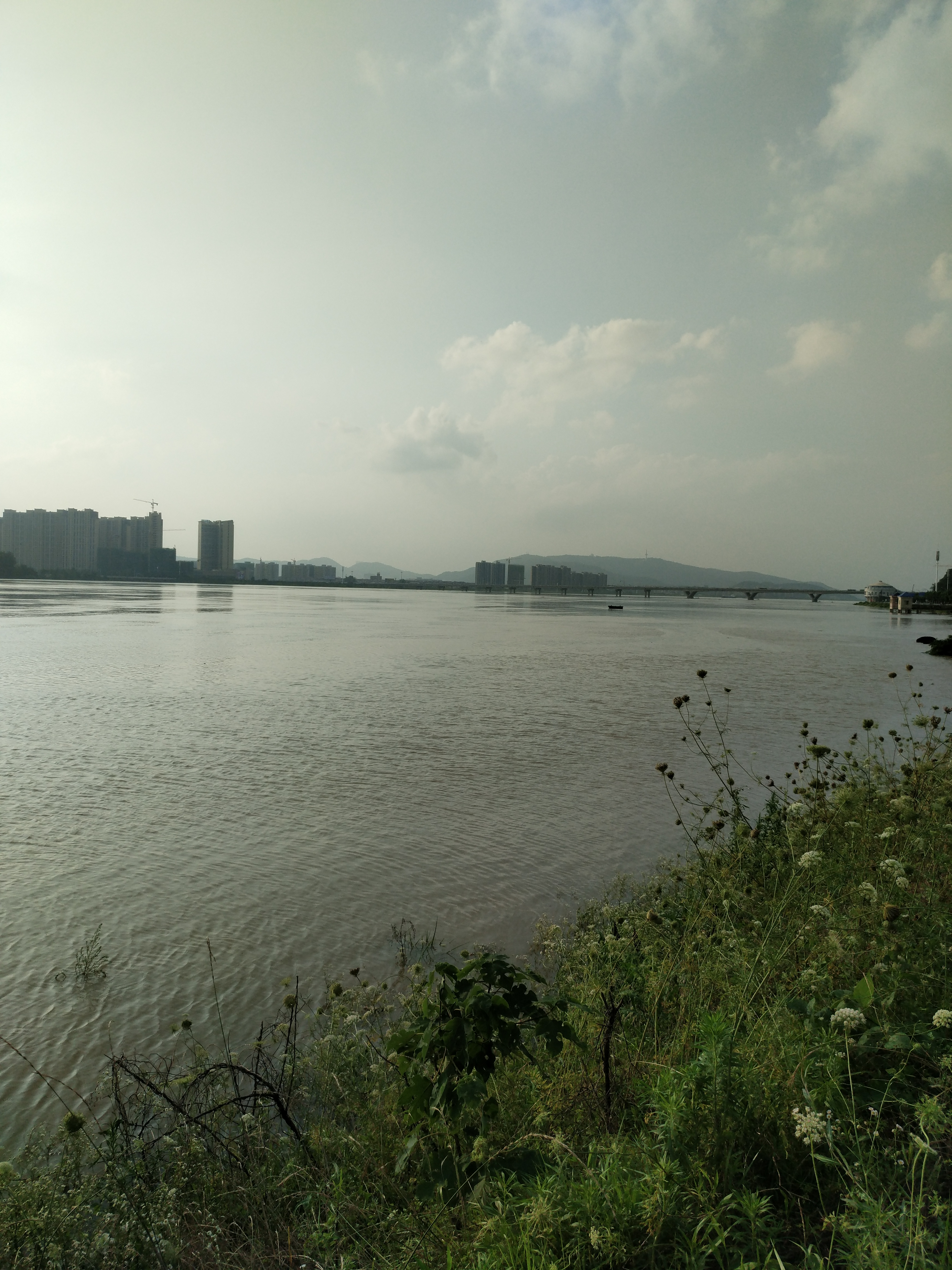
Photo taken on July 2, 2017 shows the Xiangjiang River in Changsha, capital of central China's Hunan province. The level of the Xiangjiang River in Changsha stood at 39.21 meters at 6:30 a.m. Sunday, July 2, 2017, well above the warning level of 36 meters and only 56 cm lower than its highest record level.

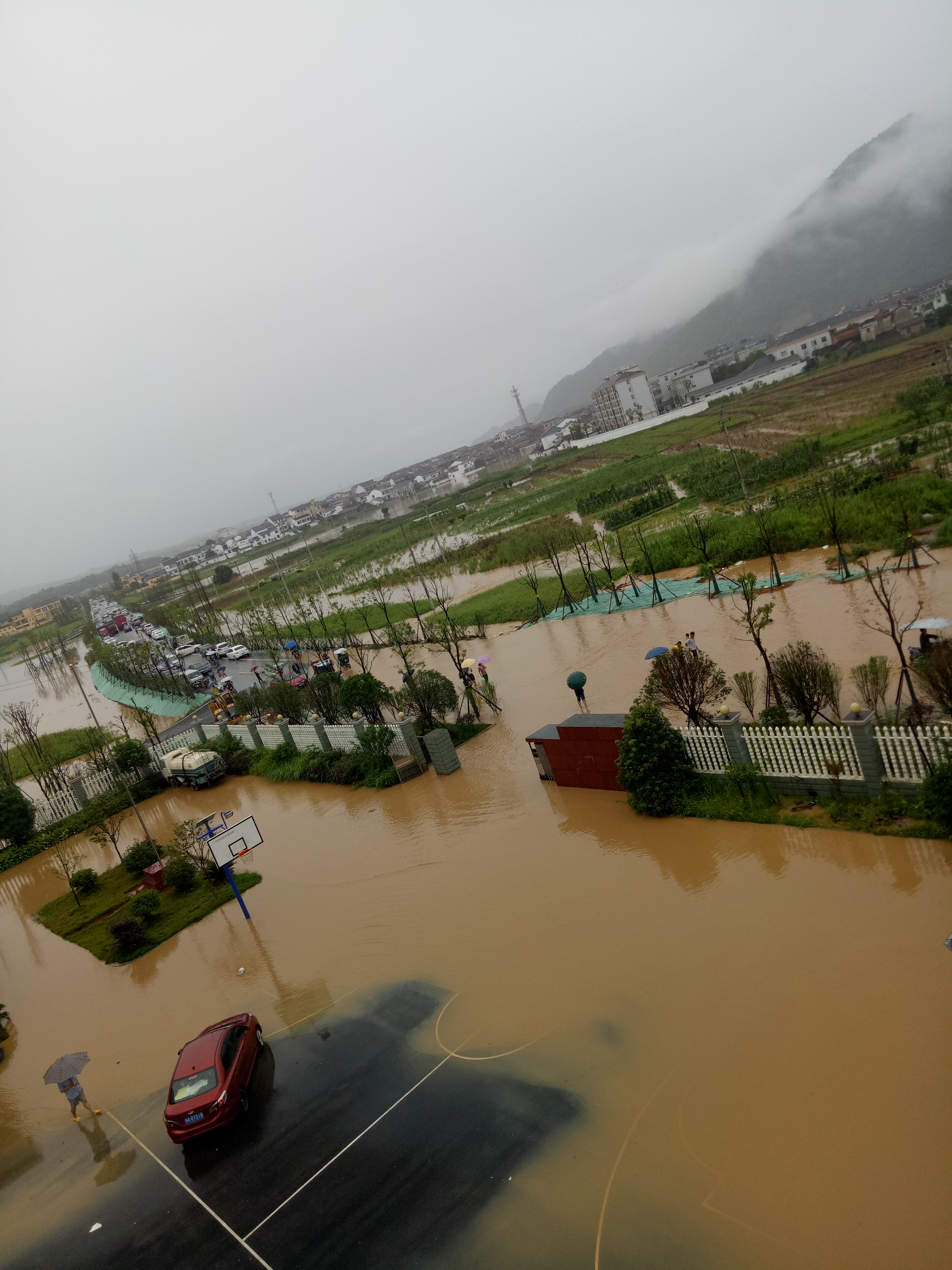
On July 1, 2017 in Huangcai Town of Ningxiang, Hunan, China, the flood flooded the road.

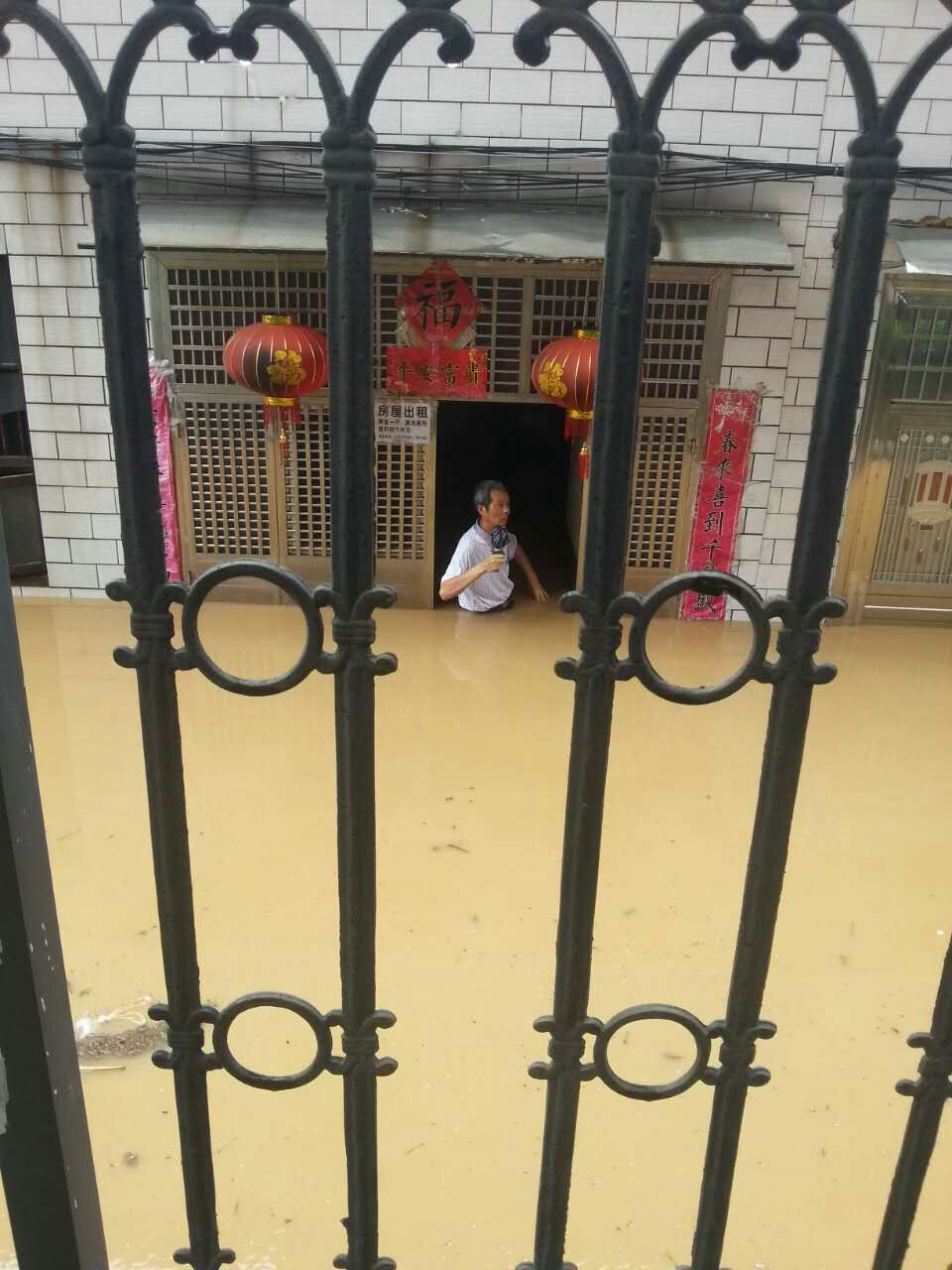
Photo taken on July 1, 2017 shows the flooded area in downtown Ningxiang, Hunan, China. The flood has flooded the half floor of the building.

=== Guangxi ===
Some small and medium-sized rivers in Guilin, Liuzhou, Hechi and other places have experienced the biggest floods in 20 years.

The latest round of torrential rain since Saturday has affected more than 400,000 people in more than 20 counties and districts in Guangxi, left 20 people dead and 14 missing. Around 20,000 houses collapsed or were damaged.

=== Guizhou ===
The city of Duyun was seriously affected by the floods, as the heavy rain started at 7:00 at night, June 29, inundating several streets and stranding many subdistricts.

=== Jiangxi ===
Heavy rains in northwestern Jiangxi have led to landslides and collapsing homes. About 480,000 people were evacuated in Jiangxi. Seven people died and seven were missing due to flooding during a 10 day period.

== Investigation ==
On August 24, 2017, in Hunan, the Hunan Provincial Commission for Discipline Inspection said in a statement that more than 15 officials were punished: "(the Party) gives Li Shiqiu (Chinese: 黎石秋; former Communist Party Secretary of Ningxiang) a warning as a measure of party discipline; (the Party) gives Li Chunqiu (Chinese: 黎春秋; former Communist Party Secretary and County Governor of Ningxiang) an admonishing conversation; (the Party) gives Tan Xiaoping (Chinese: 谭小平; former Communist Party Secretary of Ningxiang) an admonishing conversation; (the Party) gives Zhou Hui (Chinese: 周辉; Communist Party Secretary of Ningxiang) a serious warning as a measure of party discipline; (the Party) gives Wang Xiongwen (Chinese: 王雄文; County Governor of Ningxiang) a serious track record; (the Party) gives Deng Jieping (Chinese: 邓杰平; Chairman of Ningxiang of the Chinese People's Political Consultative Conference) a serious warning as a measure of party discipline; Director of the Water Affairs Bureau Wu Limin (Chinese: 吴利民) was removed from the post; Party secretary and Chairman of Ningxiang State-owned Capital Pan Liqiang (Chinese: 潘立强) was removed from the post."

== See also ==
- 2010–2011 China drought
- 2010 China floods
- 2011 Seoul floods
- 2011 Pacific typhoon season
- Chinese water crisis
- Water resources of the People's Republic of China
- 2013 China floods
- 2020 China floods
