= 2011 China floods =

- Date: June 4–27, 2011
- Location: China
- Deaths: 239 dead, 68 missing
- Property damage: $6.65 billion USD

A series of floods from June to September 2011 occurred in central and southern parts of the People's Republic of China. They were caused by heavy rain that inundated portions of 12 provinces, leaving other provinces still suffering a prolonged drought, and with direct economic losses of nearly US$6.5 billion.

== Effects ==
Conflicting reports suggested that either 12 or 13 provinces and autonomous regions had been hit by heavy floods. Weather forecasts predicted the rain would continue, and the government warned of possible mudslides.

On 10 June 2011, China's Flood Control Office reported that the tropical storm Sarika would land somewhere between the city of Shanwei in Guangdong province and Zhangpu in nearby Fujian province on 11 June, bringing more severe flooding.

China's Meteorological Administration issued a level 3 emergency alert for the Yangtze on 12 June. As of 17 June, the flood alert had been raised to a level 4 (the maximum alert level) – with 555,000 people being evacuated across the Yangtze Basin.

Severe tropical storm Meari caused flooding in Liaoning, Zhejiang and Shandong provinces, by 27 June flooding had forced the evacuation of 7,500 people, destroyed 400 homes and covered 17 counties including 33,000 hectares of farmland, affecting 164,000 people.

=== Casualties ===
At least 54 people had died by 9 June as a result of the flooding. A further forty-one people were reported dead on 10 June, bringing the total dead to at least 97, and by 13 June official totals reported at least 105 were dead and 63 missing.

National media announced that between 13 and 17 June, a further 19 people were killed, with seven more missing from Anhui, Zhejiang, Jiangxi, Hubei, Hunan, Sichuan and Guizhou provinces and Chongqing municipality. Later updates suggested 25 dead and 25 missing between those dates.

However, unofficial totals on 17 June (based on the reports from the various provinces) have the casualties at 178 dead and 68 missing.

Official totals from the National Flood Control and Drought Relief Headquarters on 30 June: at least 239 dead, 86 missing. 36.7 million people have been affected, about 106,500 houses and about 1.16 million hectares of crops destroyed, with a total of 43.2 billion yuan ($6.65 billion) in economic costs.

=== Economic cost ===
By 9 June, the floods were estimated to have destroyed nearly 7,500 houses and submerged 255,000 hectares (630,000 acres) of farmland, causing direct losses of 4.92 billion yuan (US$760 million, €745 million).

By 10 June, an estimated 4.81 million people were affected by the floods. Four days later (14 June), a total of over 10 million people were affected, and direct economic losses of 8.7 billion yuan (US$1.3 billion) had been inflicted.

On 17 June, official reports of direct economic losses resulting from this round of rainstorms amounted to 12.85 billion yuan (US$1.98 billion, €1.5 billion), which is more than the combined direct economic losses that resulted from the two previous rounds of heavy rains, bringing the total losses to nearly US$3.3 billion, €2.5 billion.

The Chinese government plans to spend 35 million yuan (US$5.39 million, €5 million) to provide relief to those in Guizhou.

On 22 June, the Chinese government set aside 340 million yuan for flood relief.

=== Other specifics ===
- Two people were killed and one was injured by lightning in Beijing, where more than 1,000 lightning strikes were recorded late Tuesday and early Wednesday (7 and 8 June)
- On 17 June, rain-triggered landslides buried parts of a railway line between Sichuan and Yunnan leaving 5,000 passengers on four trains stranded and forced many other trains back to their starting point.
- On 19 June: the Yellow River Flood Control and Drought Relief Headquarters launched a 20-day operation to discharge water from three reservoirs (held back by the Wanjiazhai Dam, Sanmenxia Dam and Xiaolangdi Dams) in a bid to clear sediment in the fever.

==== Drought still ongoing in some regions ====
- by 7 June: there were still 2.15 million people affected by water shortages from the preceding drought.
- by 18 June: Despite the flooding in many provinces, drought was still affecting parts of northern Gansu and Ningxia provinces.
- 20 June: Drought still affecting 72.19 million mu (4.81 million hectares) in unflooded parts of Hubei, Anhui, Jiangsu provinces and some northern provinces.

== Flooding by province ==
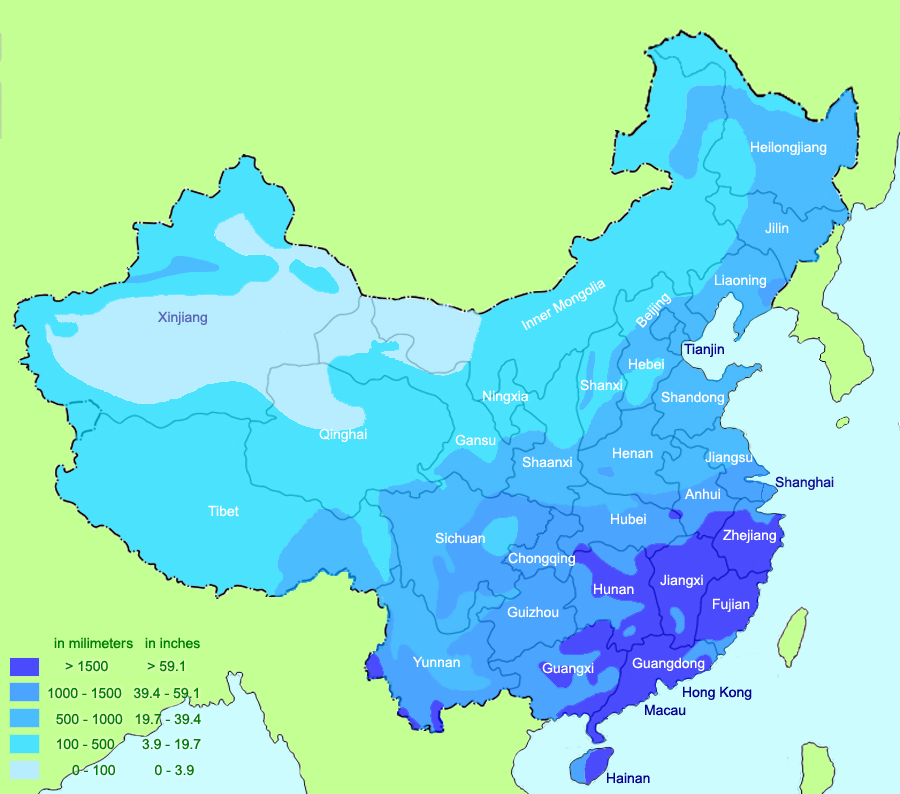
The average annual precipitation in different regions of Mainland China and Taiwan.

=== Anhui ===
- By 14 June, in the city of Huangshan in southern Anhui, water overflowed from 35 reservoirs and exceeded the warning levels in 124 reservoirs, according to the city flood control and drought relief headquarters
- By 20 June, damage had been confirmed at 117.6 km of dikes, 1,824 irrigation facility sites, 36 drinking water projects and three hydropower stations.
- By 21 June, the continuous rain had caused over 660 reservoirs to overflow, and had damaged hundreds of kilometers of dikes in the southern parts of the province.
- The Shuiyang and Qingyi rivers, tributaries of the Yangtze River, run through Anhui. Both had risen above the warning safety mark.

=== Chongqing ===
- By 13 June: the biggest daily rainfall had reached 104.2 millimeters, more than 110,000 people had been affected, 120 houses had toppled, with a direct economic loss of 55.5 million yuan

=== Fujian ===
- From 13–14 June: As a result of Tropical Storm Sarika, rainfall in 24 hours reached 50 to 80 mm. 7 were killed in the ensuing landslide, and the water level in two hydrologic stations has exceeded the warning line.
- 28 June: streets are flooded in Jinjiang City

=== Gansu ===
- 17 June: the road to the Mogao Grottoes was closed due to flooding, the Mogao Grottoes World Heritage Site itself was also closed.

=== Guangdong ===
- A middle school student became the first casualty in the province when fencing collapsed on Saturday, 18 June 2011.

=== Guizhou ===
- by 6 June: 9 were reported dead, and a further 13 missing.
- by 7 June: the economic losses were estimated at 170 million yuan ($26.23 million)
- 8 June: it was reported that nearly 100,000 had been evacuated since 3 June
- by 8 June: reports suggested that 21 had been killed and 32 were still missing,
- by 9 June: Reports had reached 21 dead, 30 missing in the county of Wangmo, in the province of Guizhou, approximately 100,000 residents of the province of Guizhou were forced to evacuate their homes. Wangmo, recorded 122.5 millimetres (4.8 in) of rainfall in one hour, the most rainfall in the county in 200 years.
- by 13 June: 24 had been killed, with 39 still reported missing.
- A report on 13 June suggested 25 killed, 31 missing
- 13–14 June: 3 were killed by lightning and 2,700 more were evacuated from areas at risk of flooding
- 20 June: 312 millimetres (1 ft 0.3 in) of rain fell in 3hrs in Wangmo county, 200mm fell in other regions
- 22 June: Five people were killed, 7,200 evacuated, more than 100 houses collapsed, and 316,000 mu (21,067 hectares) of farmland submerged with an estimated economic cost of 65 million yuan (US$10 million).

=== Hainan ===
Hainan went mostly unscathed until two typhoons which hit Philippines passed through in late September early October, which resulted in 57 villages flooded and brought water levels in six reservoirs in Haikou to dangerously high levels.

=== Henan ===
- 19 June: Four reported missing after flash flooding in Xinjiang County.

=== Hubei ===
- 10 June: 22 people were confirmed dead including 1 when rain destroyed a wall, which killed one person and injured six more. 110,000 people had been evacuated. Wuhan, the capital of the province, was flooded, with parts of the city losing power.
- by 10 June 10: other reports suggested more than 127,500 people had been evacuated in total, with direct economic losses of 866 million yuan (US$133 million).
- During the morning of 11 June the tropical storm Sarika made landfall in Shantou, China, 23 people were killed in Xianning, and ten more were declared missing, and estimated damage of $248 million.
- by 13 June: Reports suggested that 29 had been killed, and 10 people were reported missing
- 14 June: 53,000 people were evacuated as level of a local river had risen by five meters as of 7 p.m in the City of Xianning
- 15 June: a landslide left 6 missing and formed a dam blocking the Pingdu River, forcing 2,000 residents to evacuate due to the risk of collapse.
- 17–18 June: 2 killed, 2 missing, 3.01 million people in 31 counties affected, 24,400 people evacuated, 261,200 hectares of crops damaged, 2,194 houses collapsed and 5,077 houses damaged, with estimate economic losses of 730 million yuan. The affected area included Yichang county where Three Gorges Dam is located, where 278,200 people and 21,500 hectares of crops were affected.

=== Hunan ===
- 4 June: the Tuo River, which runs through Fenghuang County, broke its banks submerging roads, the flash flooding blocked some roads in the county for more than 3 hours.
- on 10 June 19 were reported as having died, and 33 people were reported missing.
- By 11 June: 36 had been killed, 21 were missing, 3.61 million people had been affected, with 149,000 evacuated and economic losses estimated at 2.22 billion yuan ($340 million). There was reported to be the most rain for 300 years in parts of the province.
- By 13 June: the totals had reached 39 killed, with 21 still missing

=== Inner Mongolia Autonomous Region ===
- 13 June: 4 people and nearly 1,000 farm animals killed

=== Jiangsu ===
- 18 July: Nanjing City had had 36 days of continuous rainfall – the longest in the past 10 years. With significant flooding in Nanjing.

=== Jiangxi ===
- 7 June: A family of five were confirmed dead after their home was washed away in Jiangxi's Shangrao City.
- 10 June: 26,000 were evacuated, about 20 people were trapped after their homes collapsed in rain-triggered floods. The maximum precipitation in some areas totaled 228 mm in five hours and 13,600 people had been displaced from the province.
- by 13 June: it was reported that 13 had been killed in the province.
- by the afternoon of 15 June: 70,100 people had been evacuated, 1,320 houses had toppled, and in the worst-hit city of Dexing 5,200 were people trapped by floods and needing to be moved to safe places.
- 16 June: in the east of the province, troops helped 122,400 residents move from low-lying areas.

=== Liaoning ===
- 27 June: No specific details but there was significant flooding as a result of Meari

=== Shandong ===
- 27 June: No specific details but there was significant flooding as a result of Meari

=== Shaanxi ===
- 5 July: 18 people were killed, and 4 injured, after heavy rain caused a 5000m^{3} landslide which engulfed 8 houses in the northwestern Lueyang County.

=== Sichuan ===
- By 17 June: no details had been confirmed for this province though there had been significant flooding here.
- 18 June: Xinhua reported 8 dead and 29 more missing in the province.
- 23 June: Six people were killed and two were reported missing.
- 4 July: All the 20 schools in Wangcang county have been damaged or in danger of collapse, 29 thousand houses without power in the county.
- 5 July: a 10-year-old male giant panda which drowned as a result of flooding 2 or 3 days earlier was washed up on the shores of the Zipingpu Reservoir having been swept into the Minjiang River.
- 6 July: Officials report 7 deaths and 5 missing since 30 June, State Highway 213 has been damaged by mudslides and collapses, including a 400m stretch as a result of the nearby river being diverted by a mudslide.

=== Xinjiang Uygur Autonomous Region ===
- 21 June: 4 bodies recovered after trucks swept away by flash floods

=== Yunnan ===
- on 19 June: 5 were killed and one left missing after floods during a hailstorm

=== Zhejiang ===
- Zhejiang had already received 100 to 200 millimeters of rain between Saturday 4th and Monday 6 June.
- by 15 June: 2,059 people in 17 counties had been evacuated, 79 houses had toppled and 2,370 hectares of farmland had been damaged.
- 16 June: it was reported that 2,500 houses had toppled in addition to two Dikes being breached, flooding 2 towns and 21 villages resulting in 120,000 being evacuated.
- 17 June: the Qiantang River was reported to be 2.4m above safe levels, its highest level since 1955.
- by 19 June: flood had caused 6bn yuan ($925 million) of damage, reducing vegetable production by 20% and pushed prices in the provincial capital of Hangzhou up by as much as 40%
- 19 June: A mudslide killed two and left two more missing in Longtan Village of Tianma Town in Changshan County
- 20 June: 292,000 people had been evacuated along the Qiantang River which was reported as dangerously swollen. A 70 km length of dyke along the Lanjiang river in the city of Lanxi was overflowing at some points, as the river had reached the highest levels since 1966, the authorities were reported to be preparing to evacuate the area due to the risk of the dykes bursting. Direct economic losses in this province so far are estimated as 7.69 billion yuan ($1.19 billion).
- 21 June: Xin'anjiang Reservoir in Hangzhou began discharging water by opening three of its nine floodgates, releasing water into the Lanjiang river. The reservoir was at risk of overflowing and will take 30 to 40 hours before it returns to safe water levels. Officials ordered the action on the 21st as the water downstream was deemed to have receded below danger levels. This was the first time since 1999 that the reservoir (the largest in eastern China) had been forced to release water.
- 27 June: Flooding continues as a result of Meari

== See also ==
- 2010–2011 China drought
- 2010 China floods
- 2011 Seoul floods
- 2011 Pacific typhoon season
- Chinese water crisis
- Water resources of the People's Republic of China
- 2013 China floods
