= 2010 China drought and dust storms =

Natural disasters in China

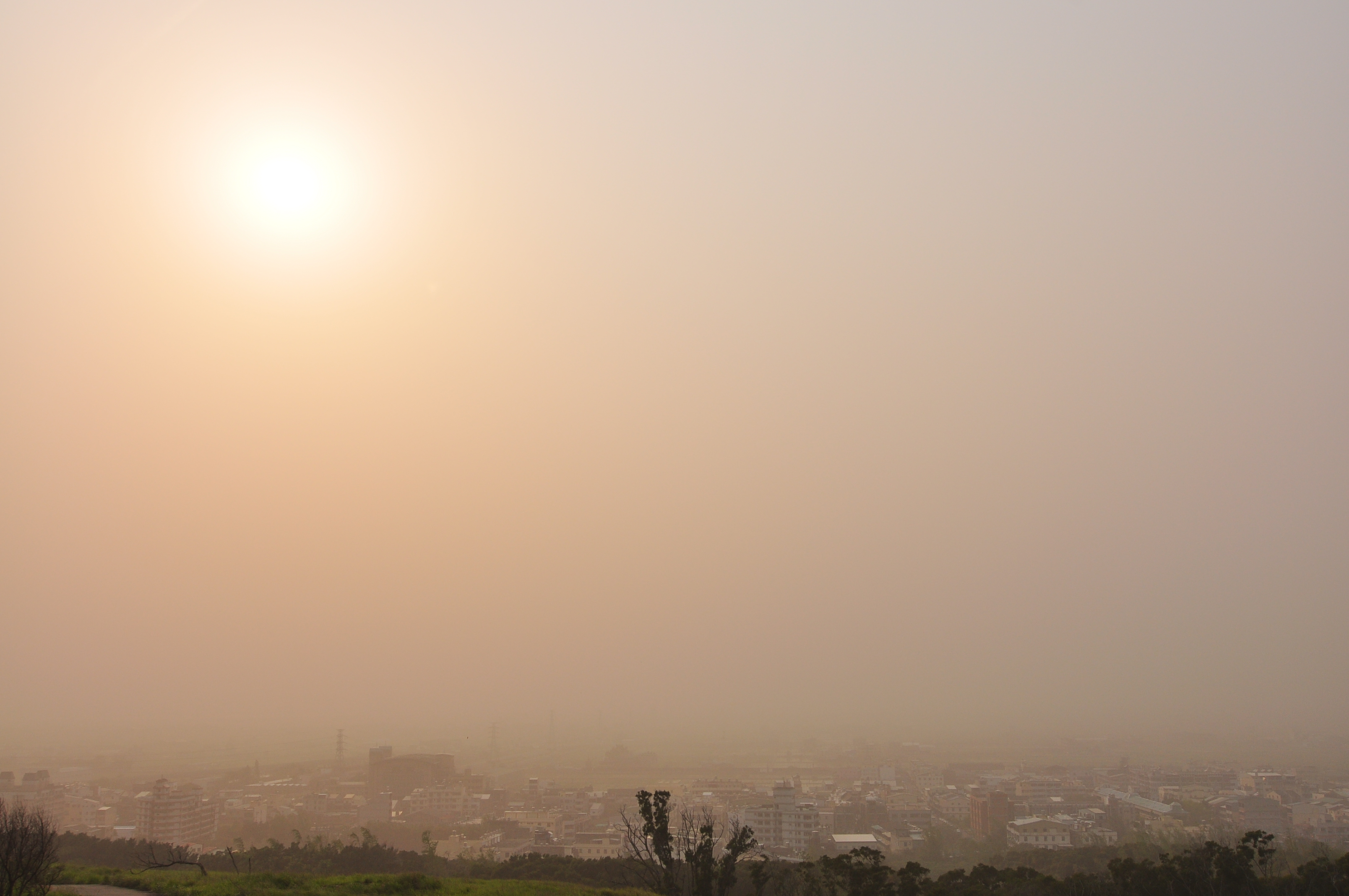
A sandstorm hits Longjing Township, Taichung County, in Taiwan on March 21, 2010.

The 2010 China drought and dust storms were a series of severe droughts during the spring of 2010 that affected Yunnan, Guizhou, Guangxi, Sichuan, Shanxi, Henan, Shaanxi, Chongqing, Hebei and Gansu in the People's Republic of China as well as parts of Southeast Asia including Vietnam and Thailand, and dust storms in March and April that affected much of East Asia. The drought has been referred to as the worst in a century in southwestern China.

== Causes ==
Prior to the drought in Yunnan and Guizhou, the China Meteorological Administration recorded temperatures averaging 2 °C warmer than normal over six months and half the average precipitation for the past year across the region, both unprecedented since at least the 1950s. The effects of El Niño are believed to be contributing to the drought, which may be exacerbated by global warming, as some areas in Yunnan have recorded record high temperatures during the winter since record-keeping began in 1950. Some areas in the drought-affected regions have seen no rainfall since before October. Spring dust storms are common in China, but have become more severe in recent years due to desertification, deforestation, drought, urban sprawl and overgrazing. Countries downstream from Yunnan are also affected by drought conditions upriver, and some places including much of Vietnam have seen very little precipitation since the previous September. A severe drought in 2009 also affected much of northern and northeast China, resulting in agricultural losses of up to 50%.

== Wildfire ==
On Thursday, March 3, 2010, a wildfire ignited in the mountainous county of Longlin in Guangxi, China. Drought had already begun to impact the area previously, and the dry weather and lack of water contributed to the fire's success. The wildfire burned large volumes of forests and brush until it was finally put out six days and twenty-two hours later.

According to Longlin County's fire control headquarters, a day after its ignition the fire had already burned 1,400 Mu (or about 93 hectares or 229 acres) of forestland, with a front spanning 5.3 kilometers. The fire was also heading towards the Zhongshan National Nature Reserve, where over two hundred of the endangered black-necked pheasant lived and were at risk of being affected by the traveling flames. Along with the area's locals, over one hundred firefighters and a Mi-26 helicopter were employed to suppress the fire. After the fire was suppressed, the drought continued to worsen in the southern China region, especially in Guangxi. Two months after the fire, torrential rain caused flash floods and landslides in the same area.

== Water shortages ==
By March 22, 2010, about 51 million people faced water shortages in a number of provinces. Commodities including sugar cane, flowers, tea, fruit, potatoes, rapeseed, medicinal ingredients, tobacco, wheat, rubber and coffee have been severely affected with output reduced by as much as 50%. Authorities began to fear unrest due to soaring food prices and sent more than 10,000 armed police to the affected regions to ensure stability and help with water supplies. The three wells in the village of Xiazha in Guangxi Autonomous Region were reported to have gone completely dry for the first time since 1517, in addition to three reservoirs in the area going dry. Economic damage to agriculture and failed electricity generation from hydroelectric dams from the drought was estimated to be at least 24 billion Chinese yuan ($3.5 billion USD). Around 3,600 rivers and brooks in Guizhou have run dry, while 916,000 ha of crops were affected by drought in the province and one million farmers have left to find work in other provinces. The drought affected over 28 million farmers, and a grain shortage has affected 8 million people. The Chinese government has transferred 1.7 million tonnes of grain to the region to reduce potential inflation. About 4.348 million ha of cropland were affected by the drought in Southwestern China and 942,000 ha would yield no harvest by late March, according to China's State Commission of Disaster Relief. In late March, the government began cloud seeding in Guizhou using silver iodide to produce rain. By April 10, the drought had eased in Chongqing due to heavy rain, but it had affected over 18 million livestock and 8.13 million ha of land. In parts of Yunnan Province inhabited by the Dai people, officials cancelled or shortened the Songkran water dousing festival due to the water shortage, including in Dehong Dai and Jingpo Autonomous Prefecture and Xishuangbanna Dai Autonomous Prefecture. By early June, the drought had affected close to 5 million hectares of land.

The drought may also affect water levels at the headwaters of the Yangtze, Mekong and Salween Rivers. Countries downstream of the Mekong, including Thailand, suggested that the building of dams on the river such as at Lancang may be worsening the effects of drought on the river's water levels, which were at their lowest in 20 years. Fisheries along the Mekong in Thailand have halted, and 7.9 million people in the country are affected by the drought. 3,674 small dams within the river basin have dried up.

The drought in Vietnam was described as the country's worst in a century. The Red River near Hanoi was by early March at a level of 0.68 m (2.2 ft), the lowest on record, and rice plantations have been severely affected. Timber fires have been sparked in several regions. The Mekong Delta experienced its lowest water levels in nearly 20 years, threatening to produce saltwater intrusion in dry areas. Some parts of Vietnam are forecast to possibly receive no rain until August. A power shortage of up to one billion kilowatt-hours could also hit the country as less water is available for hydroelectricity.

The El Niño conditions of the winter prior to the drought has raised concerns that the rice crop in Vietnam, Thailand and the Philippines may be significantly reduced by the summer.

The lack of precipitation caused land subsidence at Kunming Wujiaba International Airport in Yunnan.

About 5,000 villagers in Yunnan Province have left their homes from the drought for streams near Himalayan foothills, and many residents in Guangxi who are able to leave have also left. However, officials have denied reports of drought refugees leaving their villages. The source of the Pearl River's headwaters was cut off, and its outflow was severely reduced. Water rationing was put into practice in some rural regions.

Shortages of drinking water also affected parts of Inner Mongolia, including a water shortage for over 250,000 residents of Chifeng. Reservoirs in the city held 73.7% less water than they did one year prior and water volume had reduced by 77.4% in major rivers in the area by mid-April.

The drought has affected non-ferrous metal production in Guangxi, including of electrolytic zinc, with companies in Nandan County cutting production by 30%.

Premier Wen Jiabao visited southwestern China three times during the drought, including a three-day tour in mid-March in Yunnan, including Luliang County, which had seen no rainfall since August, to promote water conservation, and another visit in early April 2010 to several Miao and Buyei autonomous prefectures in Guizhou, some of the worst-hit places where farming has been made impossible.

Most provinces in South China affected by the drought were hit by a series of floods beginning in mid-May that ended most of the drought but also destroyed large areas of farmland.

== Dust storms ==
Strong dust storms from the Gobi Desert in Mongolia hit Xinjiang Autonomous Region, Inner Mongolia, Shaanxi, Shanxi, Hebei, Beijing, Hong Kong, Taiwan, South Korea, North Korea and Japan by March 22, before being carried across the Pacific Ocean by the jet stream, with some dust reaching the West Coast of the United States. The dust storm in late March spiralled around a strong low pressure system. Many areas recorded an extremely rare level 5 "hazardous" rating for air quality. Many flights in Beijing were also delayed or cancelled. Air pollution readings in Hong Kong reached a record high, reaching at least 15 times the recommended maximum levels by the World Health Organization. Taiwan also reported a new record for worst sandstorm conditions.

A strong sandstorm tore through Turpan in Xinjiang on April 23, sparking fires that killed two people and forcing a shutdown of rail and road traffic for six hours.

== Relief ==
Oxfam Hong Kong provided water in Yunnan. A major fundraiser was also held that raised 280 million yuan. Many celebrities took part including Wang Feng, Elva Hsiao, Andy Lau, He Jie, Jackie Chan, Ye Bei, Yan Weiwen, Zhou Xiao'ou (周晓欧), Bibi Zhou, and Yang Zi. The Hong Kong government also approved a HK$1.4 million grant.

Many donations of bottled water have also arrived in Guizhou and other parts of southwestern China from around the country.

== Algal blooms ==
In mid-June 2010, a large algal bloom, consisting of enteromorpha algae, developed off the coast of Shandong, in the Yellow Sea. Causes of the algal outbreak include marine pollution from sewage and agricultural run-off, in addition to run-off from fish farms, worsened by eutrophication following the drought, subsequent flooding and heat wave, as well as high sea surface temperatures in the area. The bloom continues to expand, and preparations have been made for a flotilla of vessels to ward off the bloom, covering an area of 400 km^{2} (150 sq mi), the largest bloom since 2008. The patch of algae since expanded offshore Jiangsu Province, and is pushing toward the city of Qingdao. The Chinese State Oceanic Administration has warned that the algae could threaten marine life and local tourism, and other scientists have stated that the bloom could decompose on beaches and release toxic gases if not cleaned up. Close to 4,000 tonnes a day of algae is being removed from the bloom, to be sent off and used as animal feed or fertilizer. Green and red tides have become more common in China in recent years. The green tides from the current algal blooms can also result in dead zones from localized ocean anoxia. Large blooms of jellyfish, including giant Nomura's jellyfish have also appeared off Shandong and around the coasts of Japan within the past decade, as a result of the same type of pollution in dead zones.

== See also ==
- 2010-2011 China drought for the drought the following year
- 2007 Asian heat wave
- 2010 Khyber Pakhtunkhwa floods
- 2010 Russian wildfires
- Asian brown cloud
- China water crisis
- Climate change in China
- Deforestation and climate change
- Global storm activity of 2009
- Global storm activity of 2010
- Green Wall of China
- 2010 Northern Hemisphere summer heat wave
- Siberian High
- Water resources of China
- Winter storms of 2009–2010 in East Asia
