= Daliang, Sichuan =

Daliang 大两镇
- Town
- Daliangzhen
- Location in Sichuan
- Coordinates: 32°19′33″N 106°32′14″E
- Country: People's Republic of China
- Province: Sichuan
- Autonomous prefecture: Guangyuan
- County: Wangcang County

Area
  - Total: 86.91 km^{2} (33.56 sq mi)

Population (2010)
  - Total: 5,240
  - Density: 60.3/km^{2} (156/sq mi)
- Time zone: UTC+8 (China Standard)

Daliang (Chinese: 大两镇) is a town in Wangcang County, Guangyuan, Sichuan, China. In 2010, Daliang had a total population of 5,240: 2,723 males and 2,697 females: 1,566 aged under 14, 3,156 aged between 15 and 65 and 708 aged over 65.

== See also ==
- List of township-level divisions of Sichuan
