= 2010–2011 China drought =

Natural disaster in China

The 2010–2011 China drought was a drought that began in late 2010 and impacted eight provinces in the northern part of the People's Republic of China (PRC). It was the worst drought to hit the country in 60 years, and it affected most of wheat-producing regions in the PRC.

== Drought ==
=== Cause ===
The drought began as early as September 2010 in some regions, though widespread lack of rain and snow began in October. The lack of precipitation caused lower than normal snow cover, putting wheat crops at risk of being killed by frost as well as reducing the amount of moisture in the ground.

=== Effects ===
The provinces of Anhui, Gansu, Henan, Hubei, Jiangsu, Shaanxi, Shandong, and Shanxi were impacted by the drought. As well as destroying wheat crops, the drought caused water shortages for an estimated 2.31 million people and 2.57 million livestock. Within the eight provinces, 20% of the farmland and 35% of the entire wheat crop was impacted. By February 2011, the drought hit a total of up to 7,730,000 hectares (19,100,000 acres) of winter wheat that had already been planted. Some lakes, including Lake Hong in Hubei province, dried up significantly, with the Hubei lake shrinking to one-eighth of its normal surface area and one-fifth its usual depth, forcing 3,234 local residents to relocate.

According to the United Nations Food and Agriculture Organization, the potential of damage to China's wheat harvest was likely a factor in an increase of worldwide wheat prices in early 2011.

By the start of June, the drought had affected 35 million people, including 4.2 million facing a drinking water shortage. Direct economic damage had reached 15 billion yuan (about 2.3 billion USD), while several provinces resorted to using cloud seeding to induce artificial rain.

On 24 June, 3.65 million people and 3.47 million heads of livestock were short of drinking water in the autonomous regions of Inner Mongolia and Ningxia and the provinces of Gansu and Shanxi despite the flooding in other parts of China.

=== End ===
During late February and early March, three events of snow or rain impacted much of northern China, leaving less than a third of the total acreage of wheat production still affected. The precipitation occurred at about the time wheat planted in late 2010 was beginning to sprout and needed water. Government irrigation and aid efforts also contributed to lessening the impact of the drought. Tian Qi Zhu, a wheat expert at the Shandong Agricultural University, said on 7 March that "[e]xcept for some areas up in the hill region of Shandong where there is still insufficient water, I would say the drought is under control.

Despite flooding in many regions by 20 June 2011, a government minister reported that drought was still affecting 72.19 million mu (4.81 million hectares) in unflooded parts of Hubei, Anhui, and Jiangsu provinces and some northern provinces.

== Timeline ==
- 2010 China drought and dust storms for drought in the preceding year
- 2010 China floods floods before this drought
- This drought was still ongoing by June 18, 2011, in some northern provinces while in others, the drought had been replaced with the 2011 China floods

== Response ==
By early February 2011, the Chinese government had spent nearly US$15 billion in cash payments to farmers and subsidies to reduce the price of materials like diesel fuel, pesticides, and fertilizer. The government announced in early February 2011 several tactics to combat the effects of the drought. On 11 February, it was announced that an estimated US$1 billion would be spent on obtaining water to be used on wheat fields, including drilling about 1,350 new wells and sending personnel from the China Geological Survey and the Ministry of Land and Resources to attempt to locate new below-ground water reserves. On 9 and 10 February, cloud seeding had been used to induce rain, resulting in 3 millimetres (0.12 in) of snow. Indirectly, the government said it raised the prices of some grains, provided farmers with technological aid, and released grain from its reserves to avoid a spike in prices.

Some farmers affected by the drought criticized the government for not doing enough to support the agriculture industry during the drought, or for giving aid too late. Others blamed the restrictions on using water from certain sources, intended to go to industrial or residential developments, for increasing the effects of the drought on their crops.

== See also ==
- Water resources of the People's Republic of China
