= 2013 Southwest China floods =

2013 Flood in China Southwest

2013 Southwest China flood
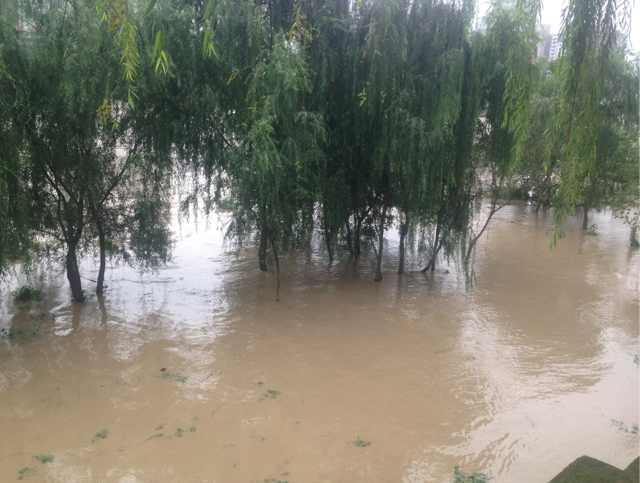
- Flood in Mianyang, Sichuan
- Date: 6 July 2013 to September 2013
- Location: Sichuan, Yunnan
- Deaths: 73 dead, 180 missing
- Property damage: $7.52 billion USD

In July 2013, much of southwest China experienced heavy rainfall that led to widespread flooding. Sichuan was the hardest hit. At least 73 people were killed as a result of the flooding, with 180 people missing. An estimated 6 million lives were disrupted by the floods.

== Floods and damage ==
Starting during the weekend of 6–7 July 2013, from 8 am Thursday to 8 am Friday, China experienced heavy rainfall affecting 20 provinces and causing disruption for roughly 6 million people. The southwest was the hardest hit, experiencing what was described as the heaviest rainfall in 50 years. In Dujiangyan, Sichuan 37 inches (94 cm) of rain fell from 8–9 July, the heaviest rainfall since records began in 1954. The rainfall led to widespread coding that destroyed bridges and houses, as well as a memorial for victims of the 2008 Sichuan earthquake. The rain also triggered multiple landslides that buried dozens of people.

Mountainous regions of Sichuan suffered the most damage. Qushan, the former county seat of Beichuan which was depopulated after the 2008 earthquake, was submerged in 23 feet (7.0 m) of water. The site had been designated as a memorial to earthquake victims and was home to the Beichuan Earthquake Museum. On 9 July, a bridge across the Tongkou River failed, sending six cars into the rushing waters. At least twelve people went missing as a result and are presumed dead. The bridge had only returned to service a few days earlier after undergoing repairs for earthquake damage. Flood waters in the area were measured at 6,600 cubic metres per second (230,000 cu ft/s), the highest recorded flow rate since records began in 1954. Two other bridges collapsed in Sichuan with no reported injuries.

In Dujiangyan City, Sichuan a landslide buried 11 homes and numerous vacation cottages on 10 July. At least 18 people were killed by the landslide which covered 2 square kilometres (0.77 sq mi), and 117 were missing as of early 11 July. Phone lines were cut, so survivors had to hike to nearby government offices for help. Later on 10 July, additional landslides trapped roughly 2000 people in a tunnel between Dujiangyan and Wenchuan. All were rescued by the evening. In Aba, three people were killed and 12 others went missing after a mudslide in the area.

Across Sichuan more than 220,000 people were evacuated due to the storms and roughly 300 dings were destroyed by the floods As of 11 July, there were 31 confirmed deaths in Sichuan and 166 people missing.

In Suijiang, Yunnan, four people were killed by the floods. The storms destroyed 5,280 homes in the province and led to the suspension of school in rural areas. In Shouyang, Shanxi, twelve workers were killed when an unfinished mining building collapsed on 9 July. Outside Beijing, three people drowned in a car. Deaths were also reported within the city, in Inner Mongolia, and in Gansu.

As of 11 July, the storms had killed 46 people in total, according to official statistics, with hundreds more missing. A further, sixty people were missing in Sichuan.

== July storms ==
Typhoon Soulik made landfall over mainland China during 12–13 July as a minimal typhoon. About 72 million people were affected by the storm. Heavy rains extended into Guangdong. A total of $433.3 million USD were damage loss. Flooding continued until 15 July, as the storm ended affecting northern or northeastern part of China. 3 people were only reported dead due to Soulik.

2 weeks after Soulik impacted northern China, Tropical Storm Jebi made landfall over Hainan on 1 August. Approximately 1000 homes were damages and damage loss amounted to $20 million USD.

Just after Jebi, Mangkhut had affected the most southern part of China. But this storm didn't made that much effects.

== August storms ==
Widespread damage took place in Guangdong Province. With that, at least 4 people were killed by the storm. As of 15–16 August, another person was killed in Dongguan. Losses across the province amounted to a total of $6.6 billion USD.

On 16 August, it was reported that in Guangxi, 6 were reported dead and damages topped $62.5 million USD. Widespread flooding was also reported in the province of Hunan and 5 people were killed.

Trami made landfall over East China in the midnight hours of 22 August. Losses were reported to be about $406 million USD and most of the damage occurred in Fujian Province. In Guangxi, 2 people were killed.

== Contributing factors ==
It is thought that the 2008 earthquake contributed to geological instability, which contributed to the landslides. Deforestation was likely a significant factor.

== See also ==
- 2008 South China floods
- 2010 China floods
- 2011 China floods
- 2013 North India floods
