= Qingyi River (Anhui) =

Coordinates: 31.3247°N 118.3619°E

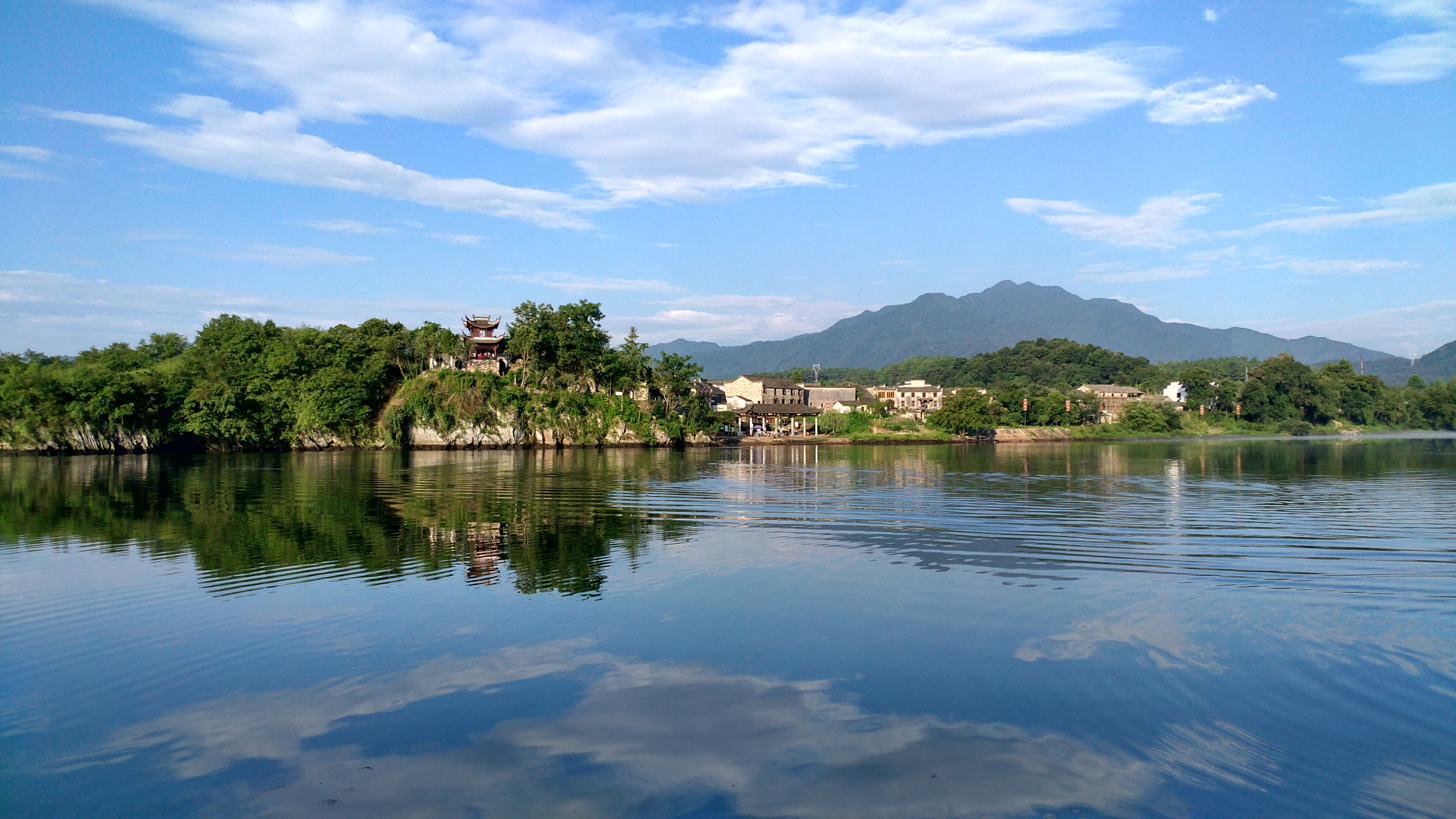
- Qingyi River in Taohuatan

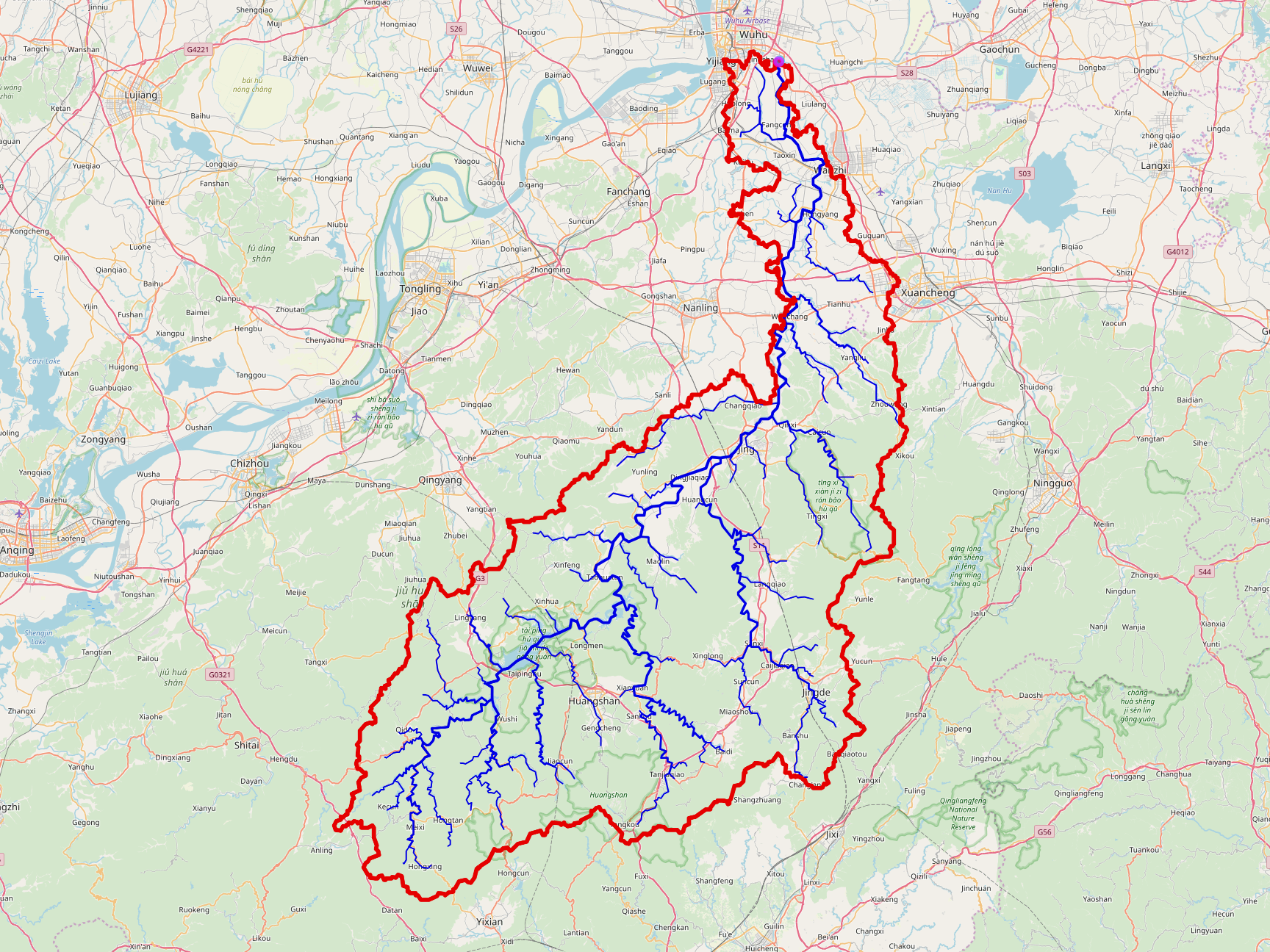
- Qingyi river basin
- Native name: Qing-Yi-Jiang (Chinese)

Location
- Country: China

Physical characteristics
- Source
  - location: Yixian, Anhui Province, China
  - elevation: 709 m (2,326 ft)
- Mouth
  - location: Wuhu, Anhui Province, China
  - elevation: 11 m (36 ft)
- Length: 291 km (181 mi)
- Basin size: 8,178 km^{2} (3,158 sq mi)

Basin features
- River system: Yangtze River; Qingyi - Shuiyang River System

Qingyi River (Chinese: 青弋江) is a major tributary of lower Yangtze River. It is the longest tributary river of lower Yangtze River valley, as well as the longest river originated in Anhui Province. The source of Qingyi River is in Huang Mountains. It has about 30 tributaries, including Hui River, Machuan River, Gufeng River and Yangxi River.
