= Puji, Wangcang County =

Puji 普济镇
- Town
- Location in Sichuan
- Coordinates: 32°14′12″N 106°27′21″E
- Country: People's Republic of China
- Province: Sichuan
- Prefecture-level city: Guangyuan
- County: Wangcang County

Area
  - Total: 156.36 km^{2} (60.37 sq mi)

Population (2019)
  - Total: 27,045
  - Density: 172.97/km^{2} (447.98/sq mi)
- Time zone: UTC+08:00 (China Standard)
- Postal code: 628207
- Area code: 0839

Puji (simplified Chinese: 普济镇; traditional Chinese: 普濟鎮; pinyin: Pǔjì Zhèn) is a town in Wangcang County, Sichuan, China. As of the 2019 statistics it had a population of 27,045 and an area of 156.36 square kilometres (60.37 sq mi).

== Administrative division ==
As of 2017, the town is divided into 12 villages and two communities:

1. Puziling Community (普子岭社区)
2. Daichiba Community (代池坝社区)
3. Jiujiang (九江村)
4. Xiumei (秀海村)
5. Longchi (龙池村)
6. Foziyan (佛子岩村)
7. Hengshi (横石村)
8. Zhongjiang (中江村)
9. Chichuan (池川村)
10. Daying (大营村)
11. Hongjiang (洪江村)
12. Yuexi (月西村)
13. Qingjiang (清江村)
14. Yuanjing (远景村)

== History ==
It was incorporated as a township in 1940.

After establishment of the Communist State, in 1950, Puji District was set up. In 1961, during the Great Leap Forward, it was renamed "Puji People's Commune". In 1962, former Tiantai Township (天台乡), Yuanjing Township (远景乡) and Puji Township merged to form Puji Town.

In January 2021, 22 stone Buddha statues of the Tang dynasty (618 907) and one stone sheep of the Ming dynasty (1368 1644) in the Foziyan Cliff Inscriptions (佛子岩摩崖石刻; 'Buddha Rock Cliff Inscriptions') were stolen.

== Geography ==
It lies at the south central Wangcang County, bordering the town of Huangyang to the west, Longfeng Township and Mumen Town to the south, Daliang Township to the north, and Sanjiang Town to the east.

The highest point in the town is Shizike (狮子窠; 'Lion's nest') which stands 1,920.1 metres (6,300 ft) above sea level. The lowest point is the Hengshi Bridge (横石大桥), which, at 477 metres (1,565 ft) above sea level.

Qing Stream (清江), a tributary of the Qu River, flows through the town north to south.

The town experiences a subtropical humid monsoon climate, with an average annual temperature of 15.6 °C (60.1 °F), total annual rainfall of 570.2-millimetre (22.45 in), and a frost-free period of 256 days.

== Economy ==
The town's economy is based on nearby mineral resources and agricultural resources. The region is abound with coal, bluestone, sulfur, iron, copper, dolomite, and limestone. Rice, wheat and corn are the main crops produced.

== Demographics ==
Population census
Year	Pop.	±%
2011	32,900	—
2017	16,259	−50.6%
2019	27,045	+66.3%

In 2019, the National Bureau of Statistics of the People's Republic of China estimated the town's population to be 27,045.

== Transportation ==
The town is connected to two highways: the Provincial Highway S16 and the Provincial Highway S20, both pass across the south of the town.

== Tourist attractions ==
The Foziyan Cliff Inscriptions (佛子岩摩崖石刻; 'Buddha Rock Cliff Inscriptions') is a historical site of the Tang dynasty (618–907) in Sichuan and is a provincial cultural relic preservation organ.
