= 2010 China floods =

Series of natural disasters throughout China

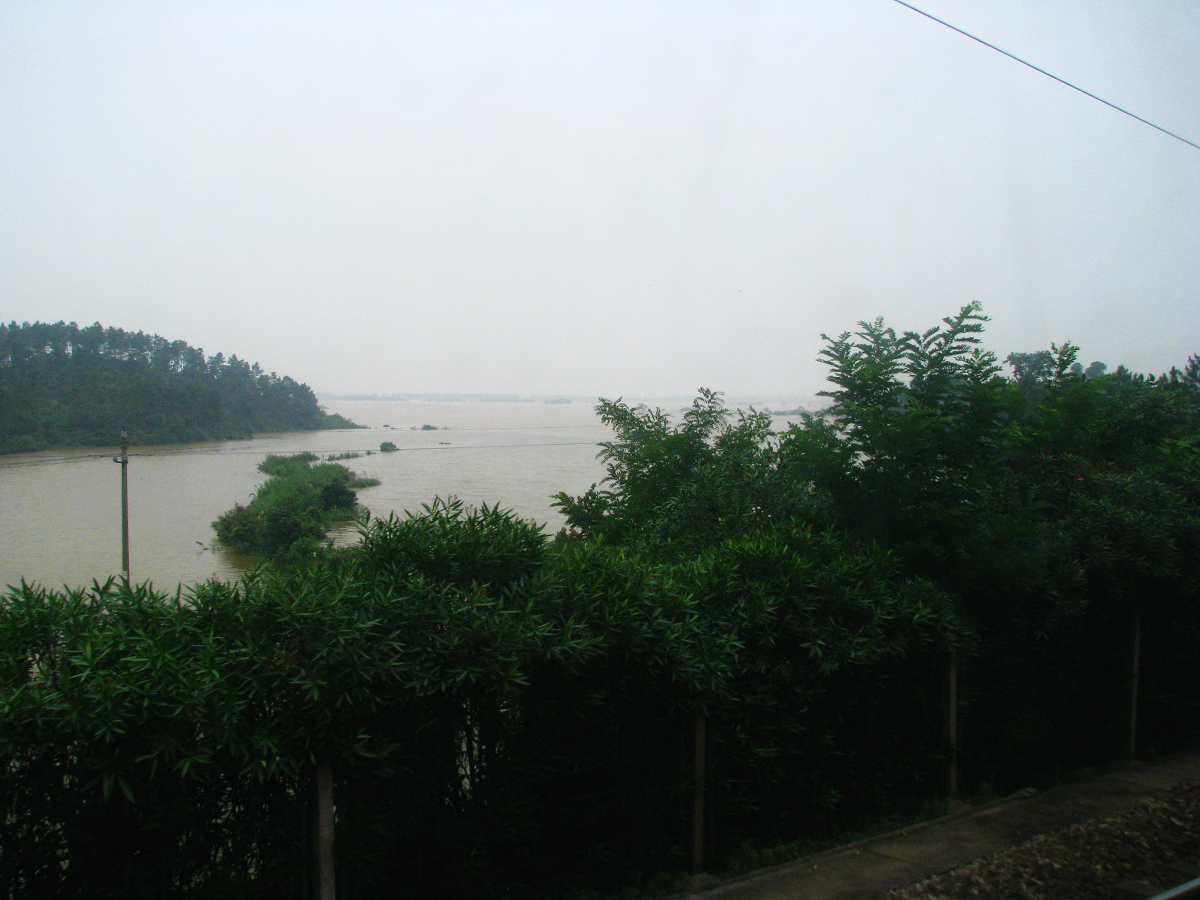
- Flooding along the Gan River in Zhangshu, Jiangxi

Meteorological history
- Duration: 10 May – September 2010

Overall effects
- Fatalities: 3,189+ dead, at least 1,056 missing
- Damage: 51.4 billion USD
- Areas affected: 28 provinces, autonomous regions, and municipalities in the People's Republic of China; North Korea

Floods in China in 2010 resulted in over 3,000 deaths. Three hundred and ninety-two people died, and a further 232 people were reported missing as of June 30, 2010, including 57 people in a landslide in Guizhou. Fifty-three of the deaths occurred from the flooding and landslides between May 31 and June 3, and 266 deaths occurred between June 13 and June 29. Four hundred and twenty four people were killed by the end of June, including 42 from the Guizhou landslide; 277 more were killed and 147 were missing in the first two weeks of July, bringing the death toll as of August 5 to 1,072. A landslide in early August in Gansu killed at least 1,471 people and left 294 missing. In total, the flooding and landslides killed at least 3,185 people in China by August 31. More than 230 million people in 28 provinces, municipalities, and regions, especially the southern and central provinces and regions of Zhejiang, Fujian, Jiangxi, Hubei, Hunan, Guangdong, Guangxi, Chongqing Municipality, Gansu, Sichuan, and Guizhou, and the northeastern province of Jilin were affected, while at least 4.66 million people were evacuated because of the risk of flooding and landslides in the latter half of June. By early August, over 12 million people were evacuated, and that number rose to 15.2 million by August 31.

Millions lacked drinking water. A total of 1.36 million houses were destroyed and more than 97,200 square kilometres (37,500 sq mi) of crops were inundated, while 8,000 km^{2} (3,100 sq mi) of farmland had been completely destroyed by the end of June. Dozens of rivers remained flooded, including the Pearl River in Guangdong province, which had been affected by severe drought during the spring as its outflow was severely reduced. The total damages from the floods were roughly 83.8 billion yuan as of June 27, 2010, and over 275 billion yuan (41 billion USD) by August 8. By late August, 16.5 million hectares (41 million acres) of farmland were affected by the flooding, while 2.09 million hectares (5.2 million acres) were completely destroyed.

In late May 2010, heavy rainfall caused a train derailment in Jiangxi, killing at least 19 people, and the closure of the Shanghai-Kunming railway line for 24 hours due to a landslide.

Many major rivers in China, including the Yangtze, Yellow, and Songhua Rivers were flooded to dangerous levels. The Chinese Government allocated over 2.1 billion yuan for rescue and relief work. The Jialing River, Han River, and Huai River surged higher than warning levels.

== Effects ==
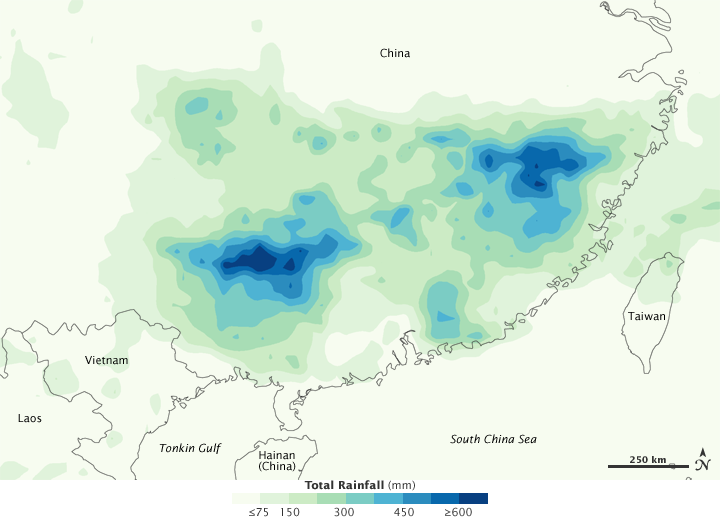
Total rainfall in southern China, June 15–21

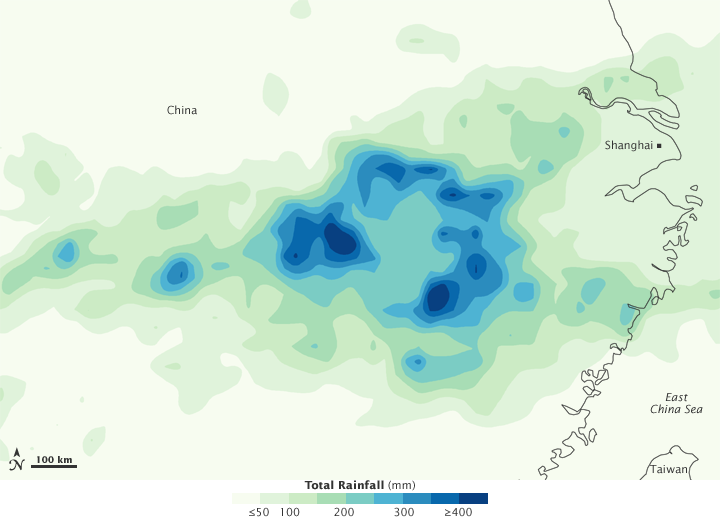
Total rainfall in southern China, July 6–12

The grim situation of the 2010 South China floods exceeded the levels of the 1998 Yangtze River floods. The flooding attracted attention from the state leaders of the Chinese Government and the public, who brought aid to the victims of the flooding. The death toll from the floods continued to rise, as floodwaters began to recede in some areas by the end of June. Throughout the East Asian Monsoon season, the worst of the flooding shifted from Southwestern China to Central China by June and July and moved to Northern and Northeastern China by late July and August, leaving the southern provinces in a heat wave while the Northeastern and Northwestern provinces were continuously lashed by flooding rains. Unusual climate patterns were linked to the persistent flooding, including an El Niño-like Modoki, jet stream patterns (also possibly linked to low solar activity), deforestation worsening the landslides, and global warming.

=== Guizhou Province ===
After experiencing severe drought, heavy rains triggered a landslide in Guizhou Province around 2:30 pm on June 28 that trapped 99 people in the village of Dazhai, Gangwu Township, Anshun. Ganwu received 257 millimetres (10.1 in) of rain on June 27, a record for the township, and the resulting landslide lasted two minutes and unleashed up to 2 million cubic metres (2.6 million yd^{3}) of mud and rock, burying at least 37 buildings and homes in Dazhai. Officials stated there was little hope for the survival of the buried victims, and the torrential rains were likely to continue. The rains hampered rescue efforts in the search for survivors from the 38 families buried by the landslide. Chinese Vice Premier Hui Liangyu urged the use of all resources to rescue any survivors. The first body, a child, was found by rescue workers in the late afternoon of June 29.

More than 1,100 rescue workers searched to find the remaining victims, including up to 30 children and infants, and eight of the original missing turned up alive. By July 1, 10 bodies had been found at the site of the landslide, and 89 still missing and feared dead. At least 1,000 people were evacuated from the village after the landslide. A total of 42 bodies were found by June 29, and the remaining 57 missing were presumed dead.

=== Jiangxi Province ===
Seventeen levees were breached in Jiangxi and 33,900 water conservancy projects were damaged. The direct economic loss is 25.5 billion yuan. A 347-metre-wide (1,138 ft) breach of the Changkai dike on the Fuhe River, which burst its banks on June 21 and again on June 23, in Luozhen Township, Fuzhou City, forced 1.32 million people to evacuate. The breach was repaired on June 27. The local and provincial governments provided tents, quilts, blankets, clothing, and water dispensers to the affected residents. The flood crest of the Gan River passed the city of Nanchang on June 23.

Residents of the city of Ganzhou were protected from the flooding by drains built in the area during the Song dynasty.

=== Fujian Province ===
In Fujian, 400 victims of flooding were safely transferred and properly rehoused. Seventy-six people were killed, and 79 were missing from landslides in the province by June 21. The village of Baozhuang was completely cut off for six days before rescue workers brought the residents to safety. More than ten consecutive days of rain hit Nanping, and factories were destroyed. The number of people affected totaled 1.3 million, damages totaled 5.5 billion yuan, and 365,000 people were relocated. Flooding destroyed a bridge in the province on July 7, travel was disrupted in 20 counties, and the town of Taining was completely underwater at one point.

=== Guangxi Autonomous Region ===
34.96 million people in Guangxi were affected, with 37 deaths, 164.58 thousand hectares of crops affected, and 16,395 residential housings collapsed. The direct economic loss is about 24.0543 million yuan, of which 10.2081 million were agricultural losses.

On June 2, 42 people were killed in a series of landslides that hit Cenxi, Rong County, Teng County, Donglan County, and Fangchenggang City.

=== Anhui Province ===
At least four million people have been affected in Anhui Province. 5,100 houses had collapsed, and a further 17,700 houses were damaged.

=== Gansu Province ===
Landslides in Zhugqu County, Gannan Tibetan Autonomous Prefecture in Gansu Province, late in the night on August 7 buried Yueyuan Village, a village of 300 families, killing 1,435 people, and leaving 330 others missing. The landslide buried half of Chengguan Township, the county seat, surrounding the village with water and destroying an area 5 kilometres (3.1 mi) long, 500 metres (1,600 ft) wide, and 2 metres (6 ft 7 in) deep before water levels receded. About 45,000 people were evacuated from the site, and 1,243 others were rescued by the army and residents. Excavators and large rescue vehicles could not reach the scene because of landslides and floodwaters. Premier Wen Jiabao arrived in the county at 4:35 pm on August 8. A power outage following the slide covered two-thirds of the county. The Bailong River was dammed by the landslide and started to overflow around 1 am on August 8, creating a landslide lake 3 kilometres (1.9 mi) long, 100 metres (330 ft) wide and 9 metres (30 ft) deep, holding 1.5 million m^{3} of water and submerging parts of the town, forcing 19,000 people downstream. Demolition experts started working on the lake to release some of its water. The death toll continued to rise, and more rain fell in the area afterward, hampering relief efforts. A rare national day of mourning was held in China to remember the victims of the Gansu mudslide on August 15. There was speculation that the approximately 1,700 people made homeless by the landslides and relocated would have to spend the winter in tents.

On August 13, 150 millimetres (5.9 in) of torrential rain fell overnight and landslides hit Longnan City. As of August 17, there were 36 deaths and 23 missings. Evacuees totaling 122,835 were evacuated to emergency shelters, and 295 people were injured by the mudslides and landslides. In Tianshui, at least four people died. Over 10,600 people were evacuated from Longnan.

=== Sichuan Province ===
The flooding affected 31.81 million people in Sichuan, including Luzhou city's 95 townships. The direct economic loss of Luzhou was about 132 million yuan. The total direct economic loss was about 6.89 billion yuan, and 25,000 homes were damaged in the flooding in August.

A landslide in the village of Wangong, Hanyuan County, left 21 people missing after burying 58 homes on July 27 and forcing 4,000 to evacuate.

In Mianzhu and Deyang, heavy rains started on August 12 and landslides hit on August 13, killing five people and trapping 500 more in an area devastated by the recent drought and the earthquake in 2008. Sixteen people were dead after the flooding and mudslides since August 13. Sixty-six were declared missing by August 20, including at least 38 in Wenchuan County. Ten thousand people were forced to evacuate. Further landslides killed 18 people, injured nine, and left four missing in Wenchuan and Qingchuan County. Landslides created a flood lake in Yingxing Township, and floodwaters 4 metres (13 ft) deep covered a 200 metres (660 ft) stretch of the only highway that links Wenchuan and Chengdu.

In Guanghan, a train traveling from Xi'an to Kunming along the Baoji-Chengdu Railway derailed after floods washed away a section of a bridge on August 19. Two carriages of the train were washed into the river after dangling for a few minutes, but all passengers were safely rescued.

=== Hunan Province ===
People in 14 cities in Hunan were affected, and 25,300 houses collapsed at the time of the report. The province experienced its worst flooding since 2003. In late June, floodwaters threatened the major city of Changsha, as water levels rose 2.5 metres (8 ft 2 in) above danger level, the highest in a decade, and the third-highest since 1953.

=== Hubei Province ===
In Hubei, the Han River at Wuhan experienced its worst flooding in twenty years, as officials continued sandbagging efforts along the Han and Yangtze Rivers in the city and checked reservoirs.

==== Three Gorges Dam ====
By July 20, the Yangtze River at the Three Gorges Dam experienced its highest river discharge since the dam was built. The dam's outflow released 40,000 m^{3}/s of water, with 30,000 m^{3}/s of the river flow held back behind the dam, after water levels in the Reservoir rose four metres (13 ft) overnight. The reservoir water levels peaked at 160 metres (520 ft) meters on the morning of July 23, whereas the "alarm level" of the reservoir was at 145 metres (476 ft). All ferry service in the Reservoir was halted as total flow rate exceeded 45,000 m^{3}/s, although the crest of the flooding passed the dam by July 24. A second peak in the river arrived at the dam on July 28, when the peak flow from the dam was a record 56,000 m^{3}/s.

By early August, a thick layer of garbage covering 50,000 square metres (540,000 sq ft) and 60 centimetres (2.0 ft) deep, including tree branches, plastic bottles, and domestic waste, had been swept into the reservoir since July and threatened to clog the shipping locks at the wall of the dam. Workers removed 3,000 tons of garbage daily, and the company responsible for the dam paid for 150,000 to 200,000 cubic meters (200,000 to 260,000 cubic yards) of garbage to be removed annually.

=== Henan Province ===
In the city of Luoyang, Henan, a bridge on the Yi River collapsed as onlookers crowded it to watch the flooding, 51 people were killed with 15 missings. Flooding also threatened the Longmen Grottoes, a UNESCO World Heritage Site in the city.

=== Guangdong Province ===
In Huilai County in Guangdong, 604 millimetres (23.8 in) of rain fell in six hours, the fastest rainfall accumulation recorded there in approximately 50 years. Three deaths occurred in the province with two missings, while 550,000 people were affected and 80,000 relocated.

=== Jilin Province ===
Eighty-five people died in Jilin Province, and 71 went missing due to floods. Jilin has been one of the worst-hit regions in China due to rain and landslides since July 20. Flooding first started in June, and over 1,000,000 people were evacuated in the province since July, a record for the province. More than four million were affected. Sixty-two thousand houses were destroyed and 193,000 damaged, while direct economic losses reached 45 billion yuan.

On July 28, several thousand barrels from two chemical plants in Jilin City were washed into the Songhua River by the floods. The barrels contained toxic chemicals like trimethylsilyl chloride and hexamethyldisiloxane, with each barrel holding about 170 kilograms (370 lb). There were reports that some barrels exploded in contact with water. The Dahe Dam in Changshan Township, Huadian City, was breached on July 28, spilling 4 million cubic metres (140 million cu ft) of water, destroying five villages downstream and leaving 40 people dead or missing. By late afternoon on August 1, 6,387 barrels had been retrieved from the river. Officials stated that tests showed the water in the river remained safe to drink. Three soldiers of the People's Liberation Army in Jilin drowned after working to remove the barrels and control the flooding.

In the city of Baishan, near the border with North Korea, an island of garbage covering 15,000 square metres (160,000 sq ft) blocked water flow upstream from the Yunfeng Dam after it became clogged at a bridge. Forty truckloads of garbage were collected, and the remaining garbage could fill 200 more. In Tonghua, 300,000 residents were left without tap water after the flooding damaged major water pipelines that were subsequently repaired by August 4. In addition, 15,702 residents from Liuhe County in Tonghua were evacuated to safer locations by August 5. Unprecedented record levels of flooding hit the Yalu River, where shipping was suspended, and the Tumen River both bordering North Korea, while Yanbian Korean Autonomous Prefecture in the province suffered its worst flooding in one hundred years.

In Linjiang City, bordering North Korea on the Yalu, three townships were cut off by floods and mudslides, and 38,000 residents were relocated. Between July 31 and August 4, 68,000 residents were without drinking water due to flooding, until it was restored at 5 p.m. on August 4 but the water was not potable until approximately August 7. Fire trucks were mobilized to provide drinking water from nearby springs.

In Antu County, 70 homes in one village were destroyed by flooding, and a mountain valley was submerged by floods 20 metres (66 ft) deep, forcing 570 families to evacuate. Damages from the floods in the county exceeded 800 million yuan, equal to about 5.7 times the county government's revenue in 2009. In central Jilin, 204 millimetres (8.0 in) of rain fell in 24 hours after August 4, while 121 millimetres (4.8 in) fell in a few hours in Lishu on August 5. Seven of the 25 medium and large reservoirs in Jilin City were forced to discharge, including Fengman Reservoir, the largest reservoir on the Songhua, at a rate of 4,500 cubic metres (160,000 ft^{3}). A 24-hour monitoring system was set up on many reservoirs.

Workers started repairing fifty-one damaged small reservoirs and fortifying riverbanks in the province after the Songhua River surged to twice as high as normal. Premier Wen Jiabao visited Yongji County during the first week of August.

Other areas of Northern and Northeastern China received flooding rains, including Liaoning, Heilongjiang, Nei Mongol, Hebei, and Shandong.

=== Liaoning Province ===
Flooding on the Yalu River in Liaoning affected the city of Dandong in early August. Provincial authorities suspended shipping on the river and more than 40,000 people were evacuated from the city. Heavy rains brought shipping to a halt by August 19, and on August 21 the Yalu breached its banks. About 250,000 people in northeastern China were evacuated, including 94,000 in Dandong, where four people were killed and one missing in Kuandian Manchu Autonomous County. The rain and flooding cut rail services and destroyed more than 200 houses. At least 1,200 people were trapped by flood water. Dandong on the Chinese side and Sinuiju on the North Korean side was affected. Much of North Korea's trade with the world depends on Sinuiju, a vital lifeline for the country. The river's flow hit a peak of 27,000 m^{3}/s on August 21, flooding 44 townships and causing 158 embankment breaches. Rainfall up to 250 millimetres (9.8 in) in 24 hours was expected on August 23. Water levels at one station in Dandong rose 2.5 metres (8.2 ft) above the warning level, the second-highest measurement since 1934. Floods also covered roads and farms in Tieling City, affecting 20,000 people. In Huludao City, ten workers were stranded on an island created by flooding before being rescued, after China National Highway 102 was disrupted by floodwaters. Another series of floods left eight dead and one missing in Dandong by August 27. A developing tropical storm was forecast to bring more heavy rains to the Yalu River region by August 28.

=== Heilongjiang Province ===
The State Flood Control and Drought Relief headquarters warned that flooding and landslides were expected to continue in the Songliao Basin (surrounding the Daqing Field) near the Songhua River in Heilongjiang Province.

=== Yunnan Province ===
Malong County in Yunnan was hit by torrential rainfall lasting seven hours, completely filling a nearby reservoir, which then submerged the county. Water over roads was as deep as 1.5 metres (4.9 ft). The flooding killed one person and injured 165 others, and 55,000 people were affected in the county while 6,000 houses were destroyed.

In Puladi Township, Gongshan, a landslide in June killed 11 people at a hydropower station construction site. On August 18, another landslide containing 600,000 cubic metres (780,000 yd^{3}) of mud and rock cut off a town after roads and power lines were severed, killing 29 people and leaving 63 missing, as well as injuring 25 people, 9 of them seriously. Some of the people missing were workers for an iron mine. The chances of survival for the missing people were said to be low as they had been trapped for over three days. The new landslide was about 300 metres (980 ft) wide, and buried 21 houses and 10 trucks. The slide also dammed up parts of the Salween River near the border with Myanmar, causing water levels at its upper reaches to rise 6 metres (20 ft).

=== Qinghai Province ===
Torrential rains killed 25 people in Qinghai in July and left three more missings, affecting 41,000 people.

The Wenquan Reservoir in the province, 130 kilometres (81 mi) upstream from Golmud, was overfilled with 230 million cubic metres (300 million yd^{3}) of water, while it was only designed to hold 70 million cubic metres (92 million yd^{3}), creating a water level 1.18 metres (1.29 yd) above the warning line. Soldiers and rescue workers built drainage channels to pipe the water away from the reservoir, which would have flooded Golmud with water over 4 metres (4.4 yd) deep if its dam burst and the channels are designed to release 400 cubic metres (520 yd^{3}) of water per second. More than 11,300 people were evacuated from the city.

=== Hainan Province ===
Starting from September 30, Hainan Province received the worst flooding in half a century. By October 7, the flood killed one, left three missing, and affected 1.65 million people in 16 cities and counties.

=== Xinjiang Uyghur Autonomous Region ===
By August, heavy rains and snow melt in Xinjiang caused water levels in the region's 13 major rivers to rise above danger levels. In Aksu Prefecture, roads were cut off and bridges destroyed, while 1,000 people became trapped in the mountainous areas. On August 1, helicopters rescued 118 trapped people and delivered relief goods to the remaining residents.

Floods triggered by torrential rains pounded Akto County on July 6 and resulted in 6 deaths and 2 missings. On the morning of August 17, a 540-metre-long (590 yd) bridge spanning the Yarkand River was destroyed by the mountain torrents, cutting off a regional block of National Highway 315.

=== Chongqing Municipality ===
In July, 10 people were killed in Chongqing, and two were left missing by July 9. The direct economic damages from the floods in the city were 1.09 billion yuan, and 92 flights were delayed due to the floods.

== Relief efforts ==
The Chinese government helped with flood relief efforts, rescue work, and supplies following flooding and landslides in many regions. Donations from Chinese citizens also contributed to relief supplies. On August 31, the Ministry of Finance and Ministry of Civil Affairs allocated 2.01 billion yuan (295 million USD) to improve relief efforts.

== See also ==
- 2008 South China floods
- 2010 China drought and dust storms
- Global storm activity of 2010
- 2010 north Malaysian floods
- 2010 Pacific typhoon season
- 2010 Pakistan floods
- 2010 Thai floods
- 2010 Yushu earthquake
- Yellow River oil spill
- 2010 Leh floods
- China water crisis
- Water resources of the People's Republic of China
- El Niño-Southern Oscillation
- 2010–2011 China drought
- 2011 China floods
