= Shuiyang River =

River in Anhui, China

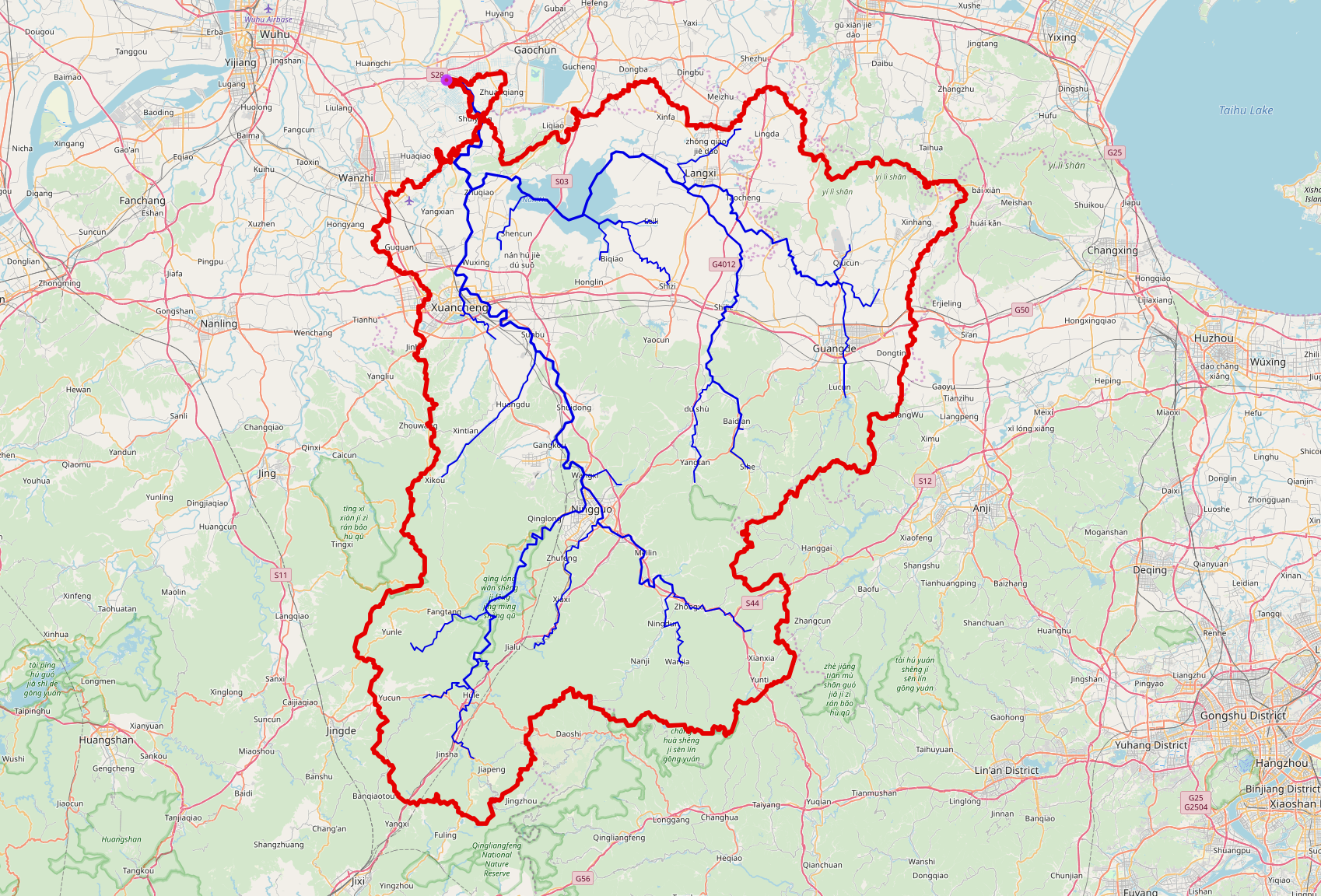
Shuiyang river basin

Shuiyang River (Chinese: 水阳江; pinyin: shuǐ-yáng jiāng) is a tributary on the southern bank of the Yangtze River, one of the principal rivers in Anhui Province. Its mainstream is about 254-kilometre-long (158 mi), and the watershed covers 8,934 km^{2} (3,449 sq mi) of area.
