= Wangcang County =

Coordinates: 32°13′44″N 106°17′24″E

Wangcang County 旺苍县
- County
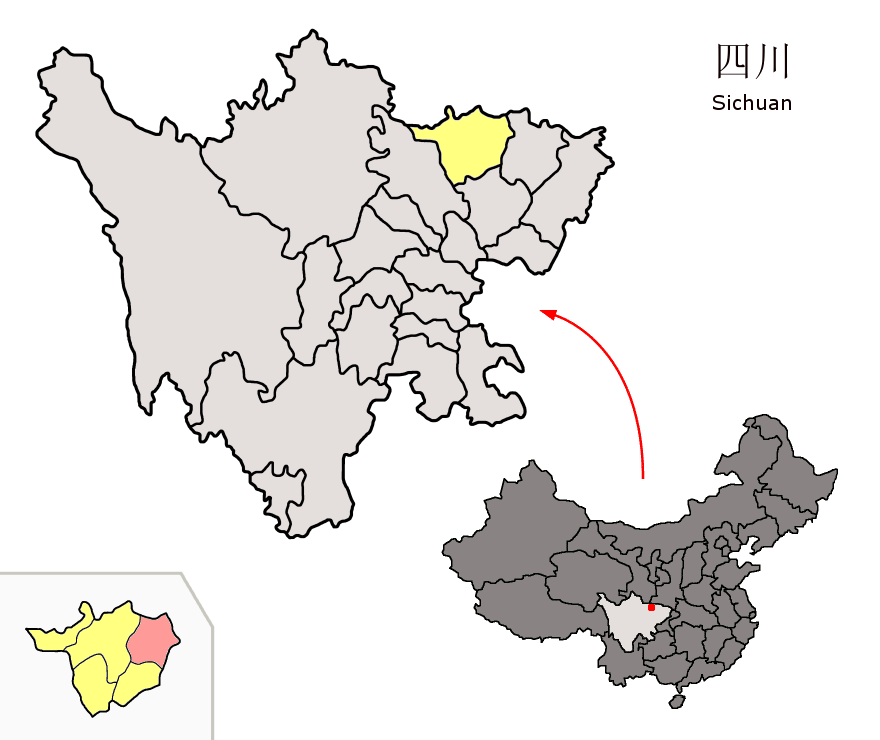
- Country: China
- Province: Sichuan
- Prefecture-level city: Guangyuan

Area
  - Total: 2,976 km^{2} (1,149 sq mi)

Population (2020 census)
  - Total: 330,108
  - Density: 110.9/km^{2} (287.3/sq mi)
- Time zone: UTC+8 (China Standard)

Wangcang County (simplified Chinese: 旺苍县; traditional Chinese: 旺蒼縣; pinyin: Wàngcāng Xiàn) is a county in the northeast of Sichuan Province, China, bordering Shaanxi province to the north. It is under the administration of Guangyuan city.

== Administrative divisions ==
Wangcang County comprises 21 towns and 2 townships:

towns

- Donghe 东河镇
- Jiachuan 嘉川镇
- Mumen 木门镇
- Baishui 白水镇
- Zhanghua 张华镇
- Huangyang 黄洋镇
- Puji 普济镇
- Sanjiang 三江镇
- Wuquan 五权镇
- Gaoyang 高阳镇
- Shuanghui 双汇镇
- Yingcui 英萃镇
- Guohua 国华镇
- Longfeng 龙凤镇
- Jiulong 九龙镇
- Micangshan 米仓山镇
- Dade 大德镇
- Daliang 大两镇
- Shuimo 水磨镇
- Yanhe 盐河镇
- Tianxing 天星镇

townships

- Yanzi 燕子乡
- Mengzi 檬子乡

== Climate ==
Climate data for Wangcang, elevation 499 m (1,637 ft), (1991–2020 normals, extremes 1981–present)
Month	Jan	Feb	Mar	Apr	May	Jun	Jul	Aug	Sep	Oct	Nov	Dec	Year
Record high °C (°F)	21.0 (69.8)	24.3 (75.7)	30.7 (87.3)	34.5 (94.1)	36.4 (97.5)	38.0 (100.4)	40.9 (105.6)	41.5 (106.7)	37.9 (100.2)	31.2 (88.2)	27.6 (81.7)	19.4 (66.9)	41.5 (106.7)
Mean daily maximum °C (°F)	9.8 (49.6)	12.6 (54.7)	17.8 (64.0)	23.6 (74.5)	27.5 (81.5)	30.2 (86.4)	32.0 (89.6)	32.1 (89.8)	26.5 (79.7)	21.3 (70.3)	16.2 (61.2)	10.9 (51.6)	21.7 (71.1)
Daily mean °C (°F)	5.6 (42.1)	8.1 (46.6)	12.5 (54.5)	17.6 (63.7)	21.6 (70.9)	24.7 (76.5)	26.7 (80.1)	26.4 (79.5)	21.8 (71.2)	16.9 (62.4)	11.7 (53.1)	6.8 (44.2)	16.7 (62.1)
Mean daily minimum °C (°F)	2.6 (36.7)	5.0 (41.0)	8.6 (47.5)	13.2 (55.8)	17.2 (63.0)	20.6 (69.1)	22.9 (73.2)	22.5 (72.5)	18.8 (65.8)	14.1 (57.4)	8.8 (47.8)	4.0 (39.2)	13.2 (55.8)
Record low °C (°F)	−3.9 (25.0)	−2.9 (26.8)	−1.5 (29.3)	2.9 (37.2)	8.3 (46.9)	13.2 (55.8)	16.5 (61.7)	14.9 (58.8)	12.1 (53.8)	1.3 (34.3)	−0.9 (30.4)	−4.9 (23.2)	−4.9 (23.2)
Average precipitation mm (inches)	10.6 (0.42)	16.1 (0.63)	29.1 (1.15)	64.6 (2.54)	115.5 (4.55)	160.1 (6.30)	262.9 (10.35)	169.8 (6.69)	189.3 (7.45)	76.2 (3.00)	35.3 (1.39)	9.4 (0.37)	1,138.9 (44.84)
Average precipitation days (≥ 0.1 mm)	6.6	7.5	9.0	11.1	13.0	13.3	15.2	13.5	14.3	13.3	8.4	6.5	131.7
Average snowy days	1.9	0.6	0.1	0	0	0	0	0	0	0	0.1	0.4	3.1
Average relative humidity (%)	74	71	68	68	67	72	75	74	79	80	78	75	73
Mean monthly sunshine hours	57.6	55.8	89.5	125.1	141.6	131.2	147.4	162.2	91.4	79.3	68.8	60.0	1,209.9
Percentage possible sunshine	18	18	24	32	33	31	34	40	25	23	22	19	27
Source: China Meteorological Administration all-time extreme temperature all-time January high
