= Water resources of China =

Geography, cleanliness, and access to water

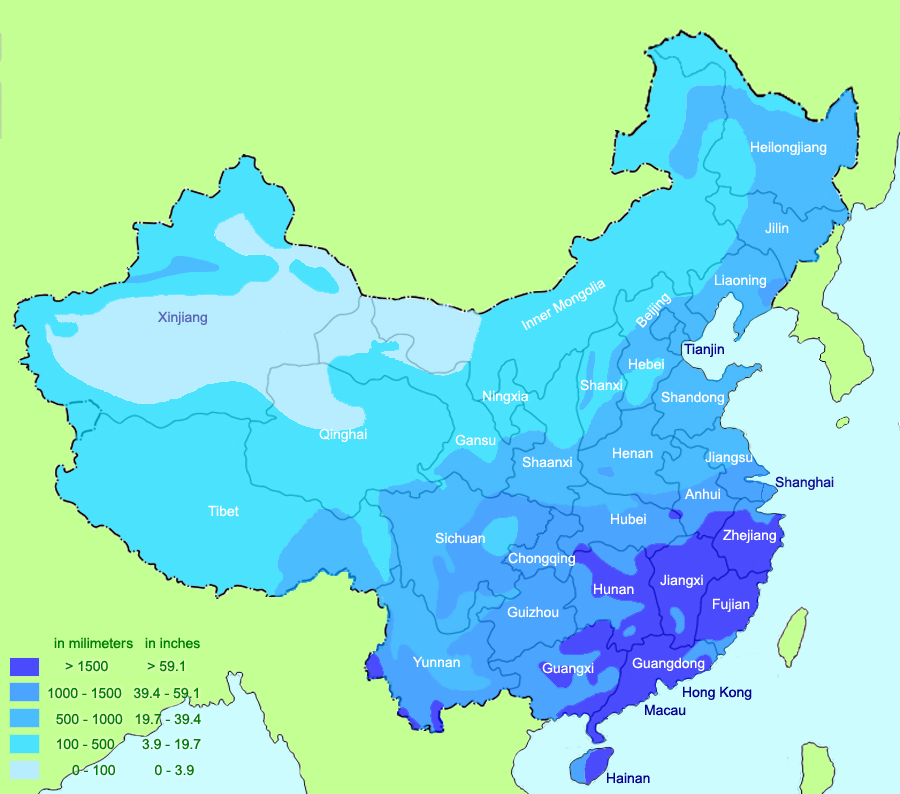
The average annual precipitation in China

The water resources of China are affected by both severe water shortages and severe growing population and rapid economic development as well as lax environmental oversight have increased in a large scale the water demand and pollution. China has responded by measures such as rapidly building out the water infrastructure and increasing regulation as well as exploring a number of further technological solutions.

Due to continual economic growth and population size, China is one of the world's leading water consumers. China withdraws roughly 600 billion cubic meters of water on a yearly basis. The country surpasses the United States by 120 billion cubic meters and falls short of India by 160 billion cubic meters. For this reason, China's domestic policy remains one of the most vital on a national and international scale.

Issues relating to water quality and quantity are likely primary limiting factors in China's sustainable economic and infrastructural development.

== Water quantity ==
=== Supply ===
China's surface water resources include 2598.44 cubic kilometers and groundwater resources amounted to 792.44 cubic kilometers as of 2022. As pumping water draws water from nearby rivers, the total available resource is less than the sum of surface and groundwater, and this amounted to 2708.81 cubic kilometers. Circa 80% of these resources are in the South of China. In 2016, 82% of China's total water supply was surface water, but only 18% was groundwater. The northern part of China depends more on groundwater than the southern part because of less precipitation.

Progress has been made over the last three decades in providing its citizens with improved drinking water. According to the UN, almost a quarter of the world's progress in this regard occurred in China, with 457 million citizens seeing enhanced water availability and quality from 1990 to 2010. The UN attribute this progress to increased water pipe systems, highlighting the importance of domestic policy.

==== Water scarcity ====
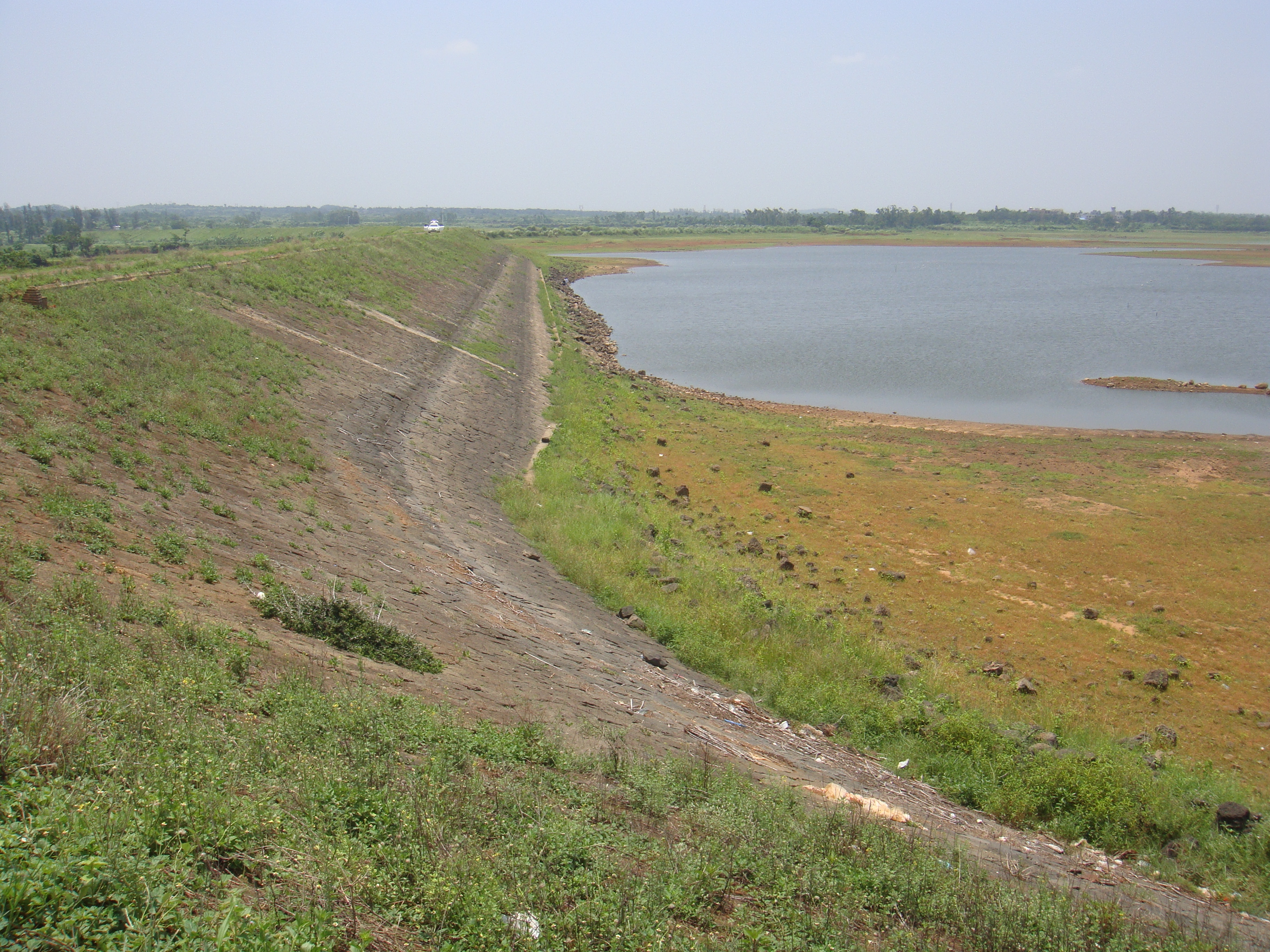
Yufeng Reservoir drought conditions, 2015.

The World Resources Institute lists many of the more populated areas of China as experiencing high (40% - 80% of renewable ground water extracted yearly) or extremely high (>80%) water stress. The WRI has also evaluated a similar portion of the country in the range of 3 to 5 on their overall water risk index, a measurement accounting for a variety of qualitative and quantitative evaluations. Issues relating to water quality and quantity are likely primary limiting factors in China's sustainable economic and infrastructural development.

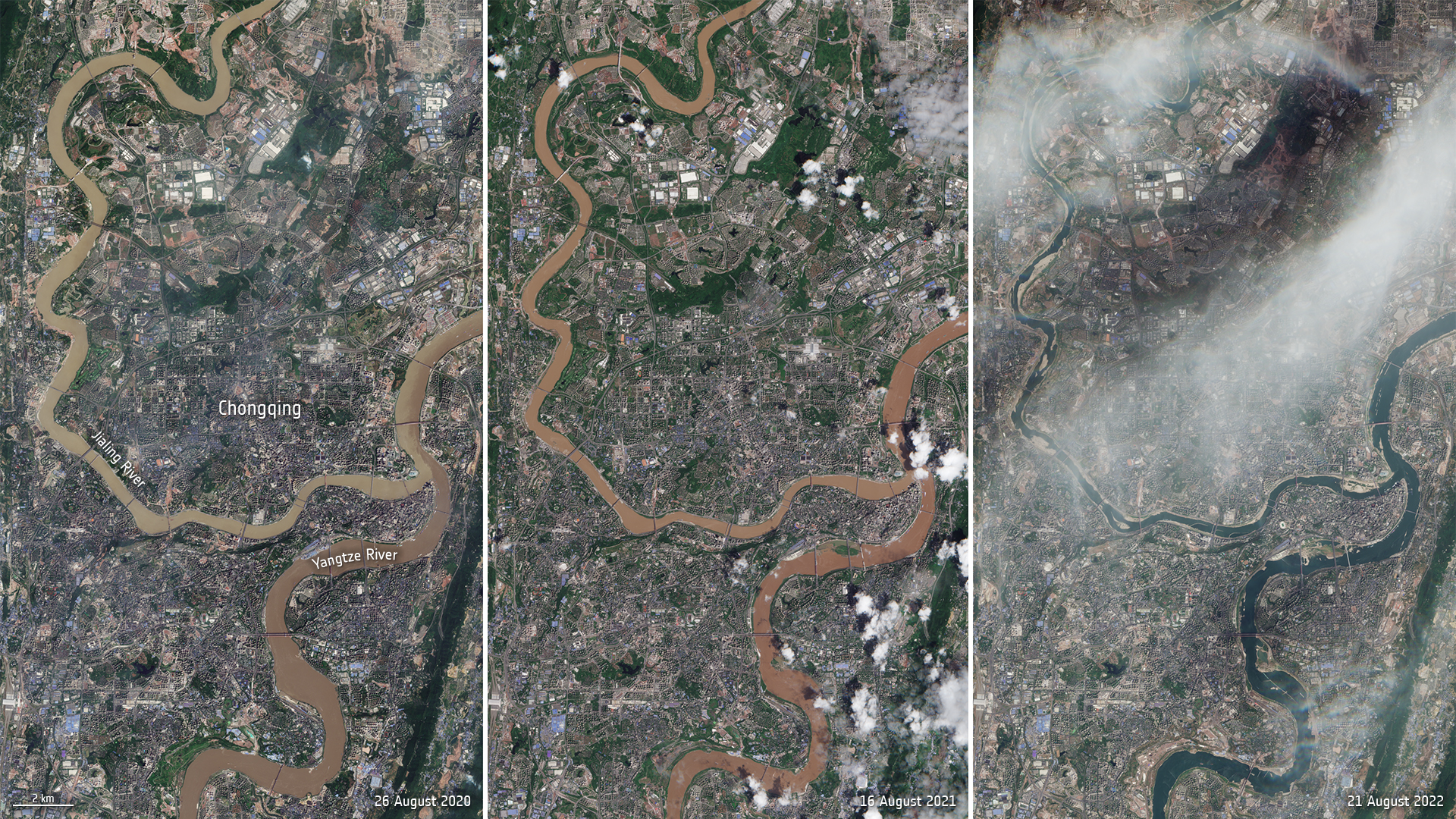
Drought causes Yangtze to shrink in Chongqing

In 2022, the Yangtze river basin suffered a severe drought, causing the river to drop to its lowest level since 1865. Hydropower plants in Sichuan were forced to shutdown or reduce their output.

=== Demand ===
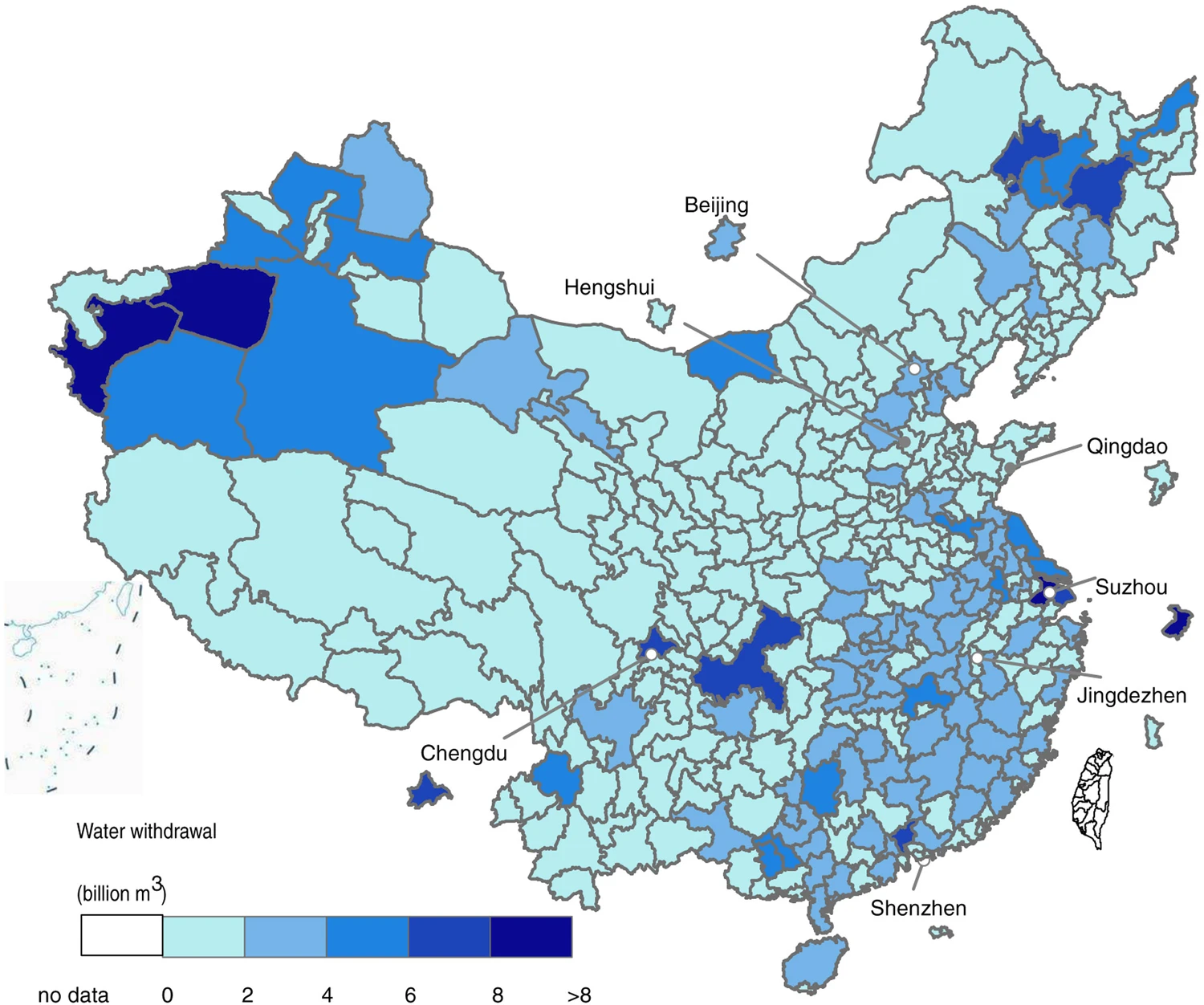
Water withdrawal by prefecture in 2015

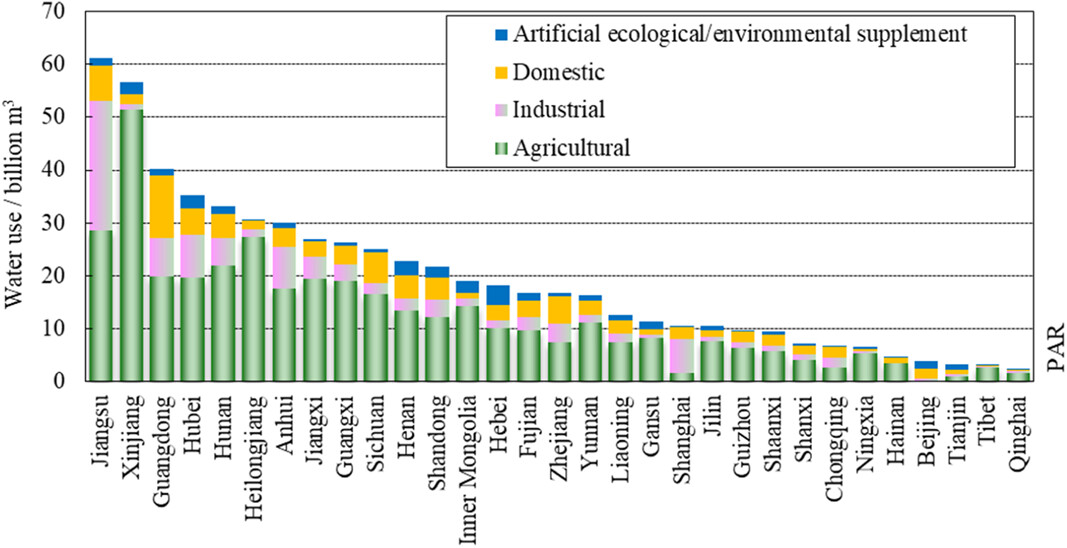
China water consumption by region 2022

China's per capita water usage is just over a quarter of the global average, which has been described as water poverty. China's population is roughly 18% of the global total but only has 6% of the world's water resources available.

Total water usage was 599.82 cubic kilometers in 2022, or about 20% of renewable resources. In 2006, 626,000 square kilometers were irrigated.

Annual water consumption by use (2022)
Use	Usage (km³)	%
Domestic	90.57	15.1
Industrial	96.84	16.2
Power plant cooling (included in industrial)	48.27	-
Agriculture	378.13	63.0
Managed ecological recharge	34.25	5.7

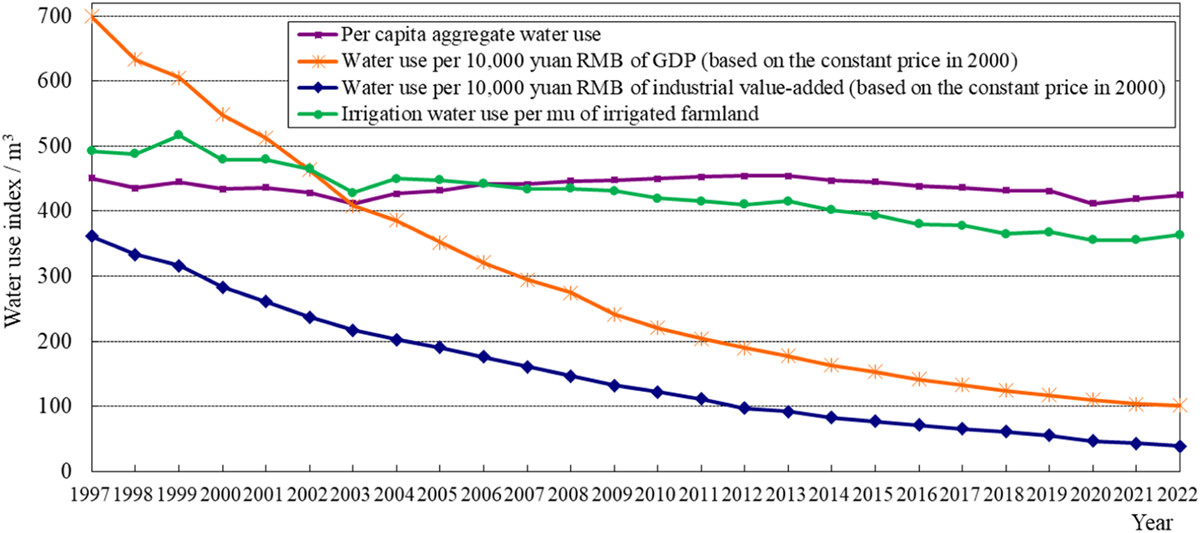
China water usage development from 1997 to 2022

Historically water usage in China has been characterized as inefficient, although since 1997 water usage per 10,000 RMB of GDP and water usage per 10,000 RMB of industrial added value has significantly decreased. Between 1997 and 2022, water usage per irrigated mu of agricultural land has decreased from 492 to 364 m³. Overall the per capita water usage remained stable.

=== Storage ===
The 753 large-sized reservoirs and 3896 medium-sized reservoirs that provided statistics in 2022 totaled to 418.07 billion m³ storage capacity at the end of that year. For the same date, lakes reported 144.99 billion m³ of water storage.

=== Water balance ===
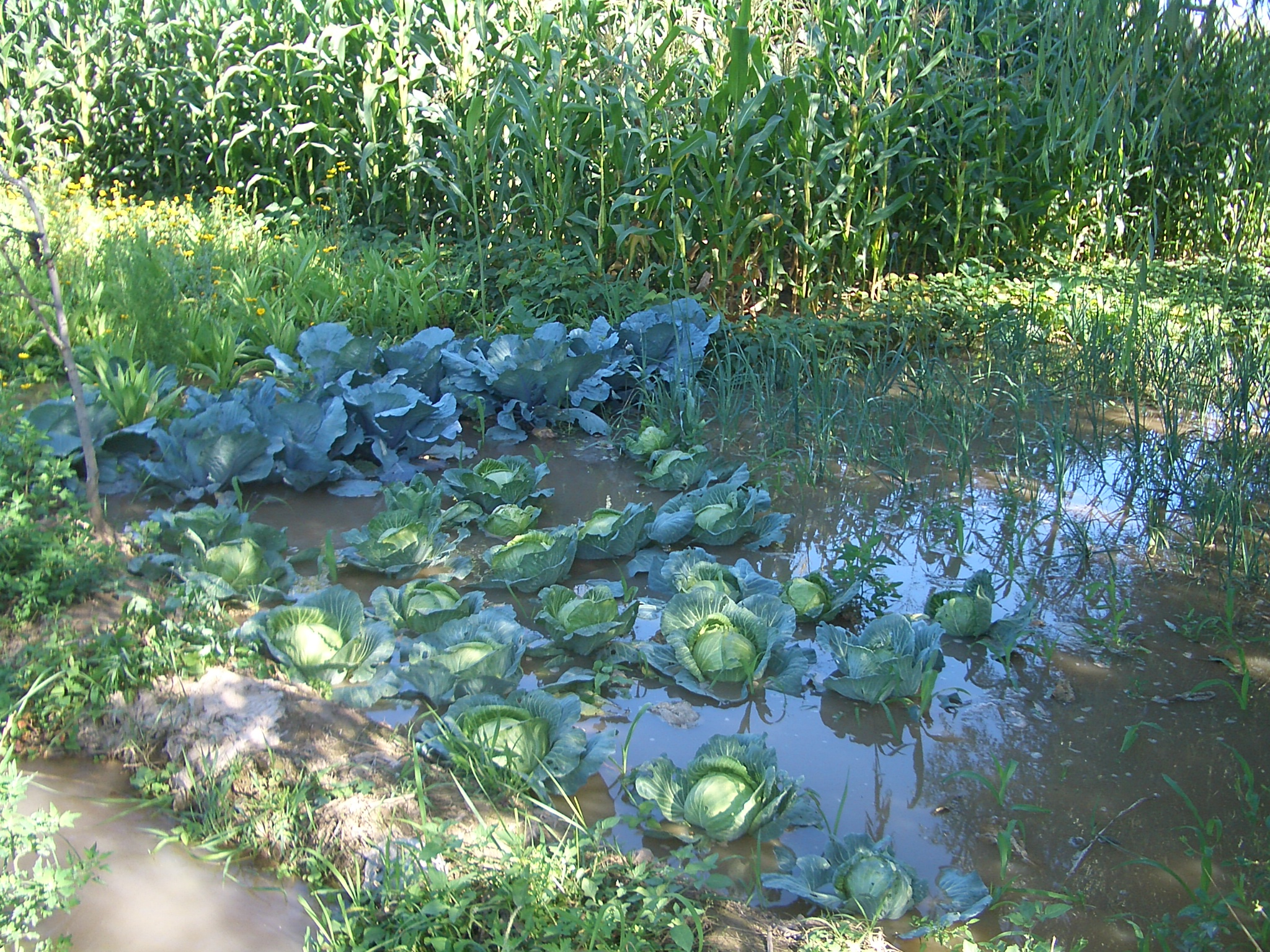
A farmer's cabbage patch being watered in Linxia County, Gansu

Over-extraction of groundwater and falling water tables are big problems in China, particularly in the north, where the area of irrigated land has increased significantly. According to the Ministry of Construction, preliminary statistics show that there are more than 160 areas nationwide where groundwater has been over-exploited with an average annual groundwater depletion of more than 10 billion cubic meters. As a result, more than 60,000 square kilometers of ground surface have sunk with more than 50 cities suffering from serious land subsidence. Flooding is also still a major problem.

In a Xinhua article from 2002, Chinese experts warned of future or current water shortages. Water resource usage was expected to peak in 2030 when the population peaks. Areas north of the Yangtze river were particularly. Northern China had used 10,000-year-old aquifers which had resulted in ground cracking and subsidence in some regions.

A 2005 article in China Daily stated that out of 514 rivers surveyed in 2000, 60 were dry. Water volume in lakes had decreased by 14%. Many wetlands had decreased in size.

=== Water transfers ===
There is a large mismatch between supply availability and demand of water resources in China. Eastern China accounts for 42% of the population and over half of the national GDP, but holds just 18% of the total water resources.

Large-scale water transfers have long been advocated by Chinese planners as a solution to the country's water woes. The South–North Water Transfer Project was developed primarily to divert water from the Yangtze river. The project is to help alleviate water shortages for citizens in these areas in the process of sustaining water consumption in sectors that use large sums of water, such as industry and agriculture. Construction of a multipurpose freshwater coastal reservoir to harness the Yangtze River flood water going waste to the sea is feasible to address on a large scale the water shortages in north China and renewable electricity/energy storage requirements.

Regionally, the Luanhe-Tianjin water diversion project and the Central Yunnan Water Diversion Project were developed to solve spatial supply-demand mismatches.

The development or diversion of major transboundary rivers originating in China, such as the Brahmaputra River and the Mekong River, could be a source on tension with China's neighbors. For example, after building two dams upstream, China is building at least three more on the Mekong, inflaming passions in Vietnam, Laos, Cambodia and Thailand. In a book titled "Tibet's Waters Will Save China" a group of Chinese ex-officials have championed the northward rerouting of the waters of the Brahmaputra as an important lifeline for China in a future phase of South-North Water Transfer Project. Such a diversion could fuel tension with India and Bangladesh, if no prior agreement were reached on sharing the river's water.

On a smaller scale, some of the waters of the Irtysh River, which would otherwise flow into Kazakhstan, Russia, and the Arctic Ocean, have been diverted into the arid areas of north-central Xinjiang via the Irtysh–Karamay–Ürümqi Canal.

=== Desalination ===
Due to the water problems, as well as for future exports, China is building up its desalination technological abilities and plans to create an indigenous industry. Some cities have introduced extensive water conservation and recycling programs and technologies. By 2021, 115 seawater desalination plants operated in China, with a desalination capacity of over 1.5 million m³/day.

== Water quality ==
The quality of groundwater or surface water is a major problem in China, be it because of man-made water pollution or natural contamination.

China's extraordinary economic growth, industrialization, and urbanization, coupled with inadequate investment in basic water supply and treatment infrastructure, has resulted in widespread water pollution.

=== Pollution ===
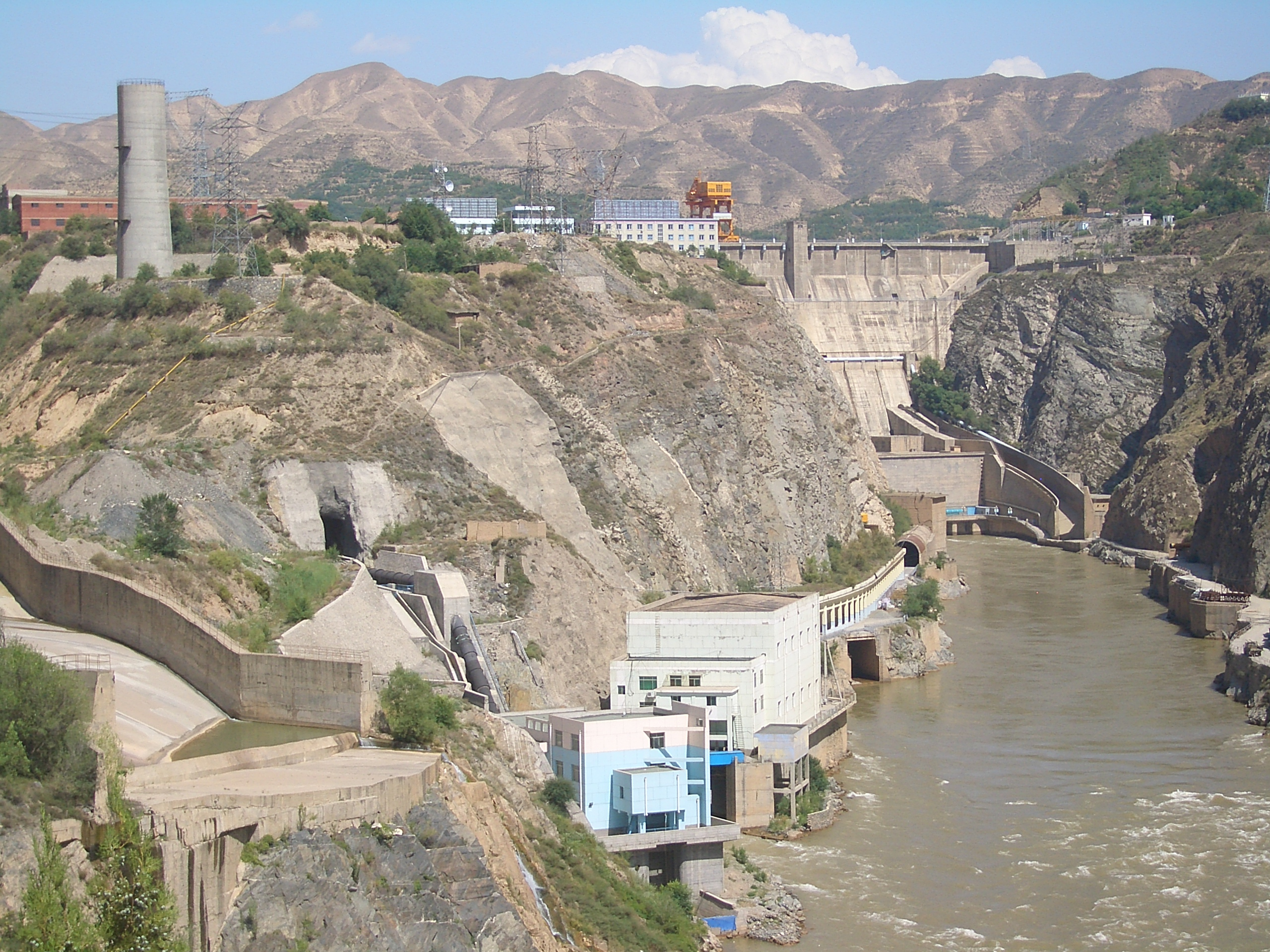
Industrial and domestic development along the Yellow River at Liujiaxia Dam

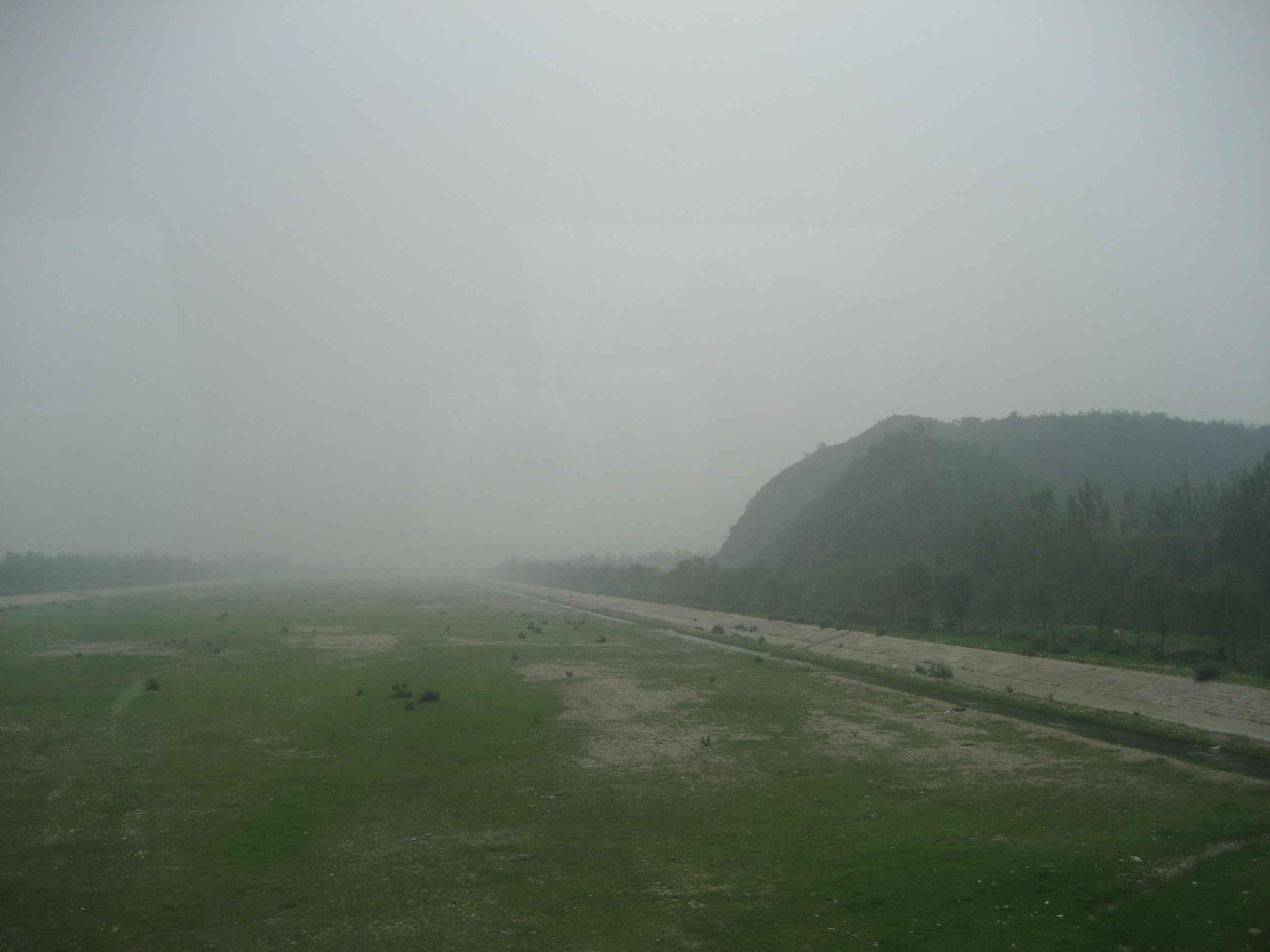
An almost-dry river near Beijing, China. July 2007

Deterioration of drinking water quality continues to be a major problem in China. Continuous emissions from manufacturing is the largest contributor to lowered drinking quality across the People's Republic, but introduction of poorly treated sewage, industrial spills, and extensive use of agricultural fertilizers and pesticides have proven to be major contributors as well. Furthermore, these water quality issues couple with seasonal scarcity of water to spark endemic water shortages, which frequently affect millions of people to some extent.

According to China's State Environmental Protection Administration (SEPA) in 2006, 60% of the country's rivers suffer from pollution to such an extent that they cannot be safely used as drinking water sources. According to the 2008 State of the Environment Report by the Ministry of Environmental Protection, the successor agency of SEPA, pollution of specific rivers is as follows:

- The Pearl River and the Yangtze River had "good water quality";
- The Songhua River was "slightly polluted" (it was "moderately polluted" in 2006);
- The Liaohe River, the Huai River, and the Yellow River were "moderately polluted" (another translation says they "had poor water quality"); and
- the Haihe River which flows through Beijing and Tianjin was "badly polluted".

A 2006 article by the Chinese Embassy in the UK stated that approximately 300 million nationwide have no access to clean water. Almost 90% of underground water in cities are affected by pollution and as well as 70% of China's rivers and lakes.

A 2008 report about the Yellow River argued that severe pollution caused by factory discharges and sewage from fast-expanding cities has made one-third of the river unusable even for agricultural or industrial use. The report covered data more than 8,384 miles of the river, one of the longest waterways in the world, and its tributaries. The Yellow River Conservancy Committee, which surveyed more than 8,384 miles of the river in 2007, said 33.8% of the river system registered worse than level five. According to criteria used by the UN Environment Program, level five is unfit for drinking, aquaculture, industrial use and even agriculture. The report said waste and sewage discharged into the system last year totaled 4.29 billion tonnes. Industry and manufacturing provided 70% of the discharge into the river, with households accounting for 23% and just over 6% coming from other sources.

Chinese environmental activist and journalist Ma Jun warned in 2006 that China is facing a water crisis that includes water shortages, water pollution and a deterioration in water quality. Ma argued that 400 out of 600 cities in China are facing water shortages to varying degrees, including 30 out of the 32 largest cities. Furthermore, Ma argued, discharges of waste water have increased continually over the years 2001-2006, and that 300 million peasants' drinking water is not safe. He warned: "In the north, due to the drying up of the surface water, the underground water has been over-extracted. The water shortage in the north could have drastic affects because almost half of China's population lives on only 15 percent of its water. The situation is not sustainable. Though the south has abundant water, there is a lack of clean water due to serious water pollution. Even water-abundant deltas like the Yangtze and the Pearl River suffer from water shortages."

According to an article in The Guardian, in 2005, deputy minister Qiu Baoxing stated that more than 100 out of the 660 cities had extreme water shortages. Pan Yue, deputy director of the state environmental protection agency, warned that economic growth was unsustainable due to the water problems. In 2004 the World Bank warned that the scarcity of the resource would lead to "a fight between rural interests, urban interests and industrial interests on who gets water in China."

The head of China's national development agency said in 2007 that one quarter the length of China's seven main rivers were so poisoned the water harmed the skin.

A 2016 research study indicated that China's water contains dangerous amounts of the cancer-causing agent nitrosodimethylamine (NDMA). In China, NDMA is thought to be a byproduct of local water treatment processes (which involve heavy chlorination).

==== Pollution incidents ====
There have been a high number of river pollution incidents in recent years in China, such as drinking water source pollution by algae in the Lake Tai, Wuxi in May 2007. There was a "bloom of blue-green algae that gave off a rotten smell" shutting off the main source of drinking water supply to 5.8 million people. By September 2007, the city had closed or given notice to close more than 1,340 polluting factories. The city ordered the rest to clean up by June or be permanently shut down. The closing of the factories resulted in a 15% reduction of local GDP. The severe pollution had been known for many years, but factories had been allowed to continue to operate until the crisis erupted.

In April 2005 there were dozens of injuries in Dongyang city, Zhejiang Province, due to clashes over the nearby chemical factories of the Juxi Industrial Park accused of water pollution that harmed crops and led to deformed babies being born. According to the article, a quarter of the population lacked clean drinking water and less than a third of the waste was treated. China is expected to face worsening water shortages until 2030 when the population peaks.

The 2005 Jilin chemical plant explosions in Jilin City caused a large discharge of nitrobenzene into the Songhua River. Levels of the carcinogen were so high that the entire water supply to Harbin city (pop 3.8M) was cut off for five days between November 21, 2005 and November 26, 2005, though it was only on November 23 that officials admitted that a severe pollution incident was the reason for the cutoff.

The Hubei Shuanghuan Science and Technology Stock Co poisoned at least 100 tonnes (220,000 lb) of fish in central Hubei province in September 2013 when ammonia was discharged into the Fuhe river.

According to a 2007 report by the World Bank, the pollution scandals demonstrate that, if not immediately and effectively controlled, pollution releases can spread across the boundaries of administrative jurisdictions, causing "environmental and economic damage as well as public concern and the potential for social unease". Once an accident has occurred, the impact on the environment and human health becomes more difficult and more costly to control. Therefore, the report recommends prevention of pollution by strict enforcement of appropriate policies and regulations.

=== Natural contamination ===
Large portions of China's aquifers suffer from arsenic contamination of groundwater. Arsenic poisoning occurs after long-term exposure to contaminated groundwater through drinking. The phenomenon was first detected in China in the 1950s. As water demand grows, wells are being drilled deeper and now frequently tap into arsenic-rich aquifers. As a consequence, arsenic poisoning is rising. To date there have been more than 30,000 cases reported with about 25 million people exposed to dangerously high levels in their drinking water.

According to the WHO over 26 million people in China suffer from dental fluorosis (weakening of teeth) due to elevated fluoride in their drinking water. In addition, over 1 million cases of skeletal fluorosis (weakening of bones) are thought to be attributable to drinking water. High levels of fluoride occur in groundwater and defluorination is in many cases unaffordable.

== Conservation and sanitation ==
Water supply and sanitation in the People's Republic of China is undergoing a massive transition, while facing numerous challenges - such as rapid urbanization and a widening economic gap between urban and rural areas.

The World Bank in a 2007 report stated that between 1990 and 2005 there have been major financial investments in water infrastructure. While urban water supply coverage increased from 50% to 90%, there are still seasonal water shortages in many cities. Water usage by the growing population has increased but it has decreased by industry causing a stabilization of the overall water usage level. Sewage treatment of urban wastewater more than tripled from 15% to 52%. Installed wastewater treatment capacity grew much more quickly due to an increasing absolute amount of wastewater. Absolute release of municipal pollutants has decreased slightly since 2000.

According to a 2007 article, the SEPA stated that the water quality in the central drinking water sources for major cities was "mainly good".

== Management ==
The responsibility for dealing with water is split between several agencies within the government. Water pollution is the responsibility of the environmental authorities, but the water supply itself is managed by the Ministry of Water Resources. Sewage treatment is managed by the Ministry of Construction, but groundwater management falls within the realm of the Ministry of Land and Resources. China grades its water quality in six levels, from Grade I to Grade VI, with Grade VI being the most polluted.

The country's water resources are divided into 10 water resources zones (WRZs) at the first level, covering 31 provincial-level divisions (all except the SARs). Six of these WRZs are in North China, namely the Songhua River, Liaohe River, Haihe River, Yellow River, Huaihe River, and northwest rivers, and four are in South China: the Yangtze River, southeast rivers, Pearl River, and southwest rivers.

=== Five Year Plans ===
Consistent with the Scientific Outlook on Development, China's Tenth Five-Year Plan and Eleventh Five-Year Plan clarified specific targets for reducing water pollution. The Eleventh Five-Year Plan set a goal of a 30% decrease in water consumption per unit industry increase, limiting water usage while enabling economic and industrial growth. Water quality significantly improved after the 11th Five Year Plan. In 2016, the Thirteenth Five-Year Plan was introduced along with the goal of limiting annual water consumption per year to 670 billion cubic meters. These guidelines played an important role in China showing a reduction in water consumption for the first time in over a decade in 2014.

=== Domestic regulations and policy ===
In the 1990s, the central government established in National Environmental Quality Monitoring Network-Surface Water Monitoring System in various rivers and lakes to report water pollution data directly to the central government.

A number of laws have been passed since then that aimed to reduce water usage, waste, and pollution as well as increase disaster preparedness.

- Water Pollution Prevention and Control Law (Amended 2017): First passed in 1984, this amendment attempts to substantially change parameters surrounding all aspects of water security. Fully encompassing specifics for actions that constitute a violation against the law, who is subject to specific enforcements, and legal liability (including a notable increase in fines) for both the perpetrators or the agency tasked with supervision that fails to act in accordance with the laws.
- Resource Tax Law (2020): A law providing local government the ability to set local tax rates on natural resource usage with the intention of enabling them to protect specific resources more effectively. The law also, for the first time, lists water as a natural resource, giving local authorities the ability to promote water preservation and limit waste.
- Water Law (Amended 2002): First passed in 1988, this amendment provided sections relating to water allocation right, extraction rights, use and conservation parameters, pollution prevention, and basin management. This law could be seen as a turning point in the early 2000s for water security recognition.

In 2007, the central government initiated the National Specially Monitored Firms program, through which it directly monitored 3,115 water-polluting firms and 658 sewage treatment plants (as well as designated air-polluting firms).

In 2011, the State Council issued its "Decision on Accelerating the Regulation of Water Consumption." The document's introduction emphasizes the importance of water management given the growing impact of climate change. The Decision established a 670 billion cubic meters limit for annual water consumption, to be broken down in turn per industry, region, and products.

=== Analysis of Chinese water management ===
Some have offered praise to China's campaign over the last two decades to improve water quality, noting the significant effort on fronts regarding industrial and agricultural pollution limitations, and improved water pipe infrastructure. There has also been a great deal of focus on the exponentially higher investments and spending on water conservatory projects, a trend beginning in the early 2000s. Additionally, titling the 2011 Central Document No.1 "The Decision on Accelerating the Reform and Development of Water Conservancy" is recognized as some as having been a substantial step in committing to water security due to its place as the country's most notable policy document for the given year.

However, many have their concerns and criticisms with China's handling of the water crisis. With notable investments into conservatory projects and recognition of the issue in early 2000s legislation, many have come to criticize China for its failure to introduce effective water resource management practices earlier than their mid-2010s onset. For nearly a decade the regulations set forth in the Water Laws regulation were not effectively enforced, so although there were effective measures drafted, the issues continued to develop. Following the decision to go forth with and begin building the South-to-North Water Diversion Project in 2002, there was a great deal of pushback regarding economic justification, local community disruption and relocation, and environmental strain on southern China. Regardless, upon assessment and weighing of these criticisms against the benefits of water relocation, the project's construction continues.

In 2005 experts warned that China must use Integrated Water Resources Management in order to achieve sustainable development.

In 2007 Ma Xiancong, a researcher at the Chinese Academy of Social Sciences Institute of Law, identified the following areas where the government failed to act, or tacitly consented, approved or actively took part and so created a worse situation: land appropriation, pollution, excessive mining and the failure to carry out environmental impact assessments. An example of this emerged in 2006, when the State Environmental Protection Administration revealed over a dozen hydroelectric projects that had broken the Environmental Impact Assessment Law.

== See also ==
- Water supply and sanitation in China
- Water supply and sanitation in Hong Kong
- Ministry of Environmental Protection of the People's Republic of China
- Ministry of Water Resources of the People's Republic of China
- Geography of China
- Agriculture in China
- Environment of China
