= Floods in Korea =

Korea has historically suffered several floods due to heavy rains, typhoons, and heavy snowfalls. Most of the flood damage was caused by storms and tsunamis caused by typhoons, and floods.

== Historical records since 1392 ==
Significant flood events and records of flooding in Korea are cited in the detailed paper published July 2017 and authored by Yong Kyun-Kim and Hong-Gyoo Syon and published by the Disaster Preparedness and Coordination Division, Ministry of Public Safety and Security, Sejong, Republic of Korea and the School of Civil and Environmental Engineering, Yonsei University, Seoul.

=== Joseon Dynasty (AD 1392-1910) ===
"..regarding flood damage, there were 178 records in total, indicating that flood damage occurred 0.8 times annually on average. Therefore, it can be inferred that the former part of Joseon Dynasty suffered from drought and flood damage every year.."

=== Japanese Colonial Era (AD 1910-1945) ===
'There were 46 records of flood damage including the torrential rain in Busan City on July 12, 1912. Among them, the biggest damage took place in 1920, 1925, and 1936. The heavy rain in Sancheong-gun, Gyeongsangnam-do, on July 19, 1920 poured 400 mm of rain, and the water level of Samnangjin-eup reached 8.09 m, which was the highest water level ever recorded to that time. Accordingly, 37,829 ha flooded and 21,482 ha of land was lost or buried. In addition, 7170 private houses were lost and collapsed and about 1100 people died. Four consecutive severe floods, called the Eulchuk severe flood, occurred in 1925....In 1934 and 1936, several severe disasters triggered by heavy rain occurred consecutively.'

== 1980s ==
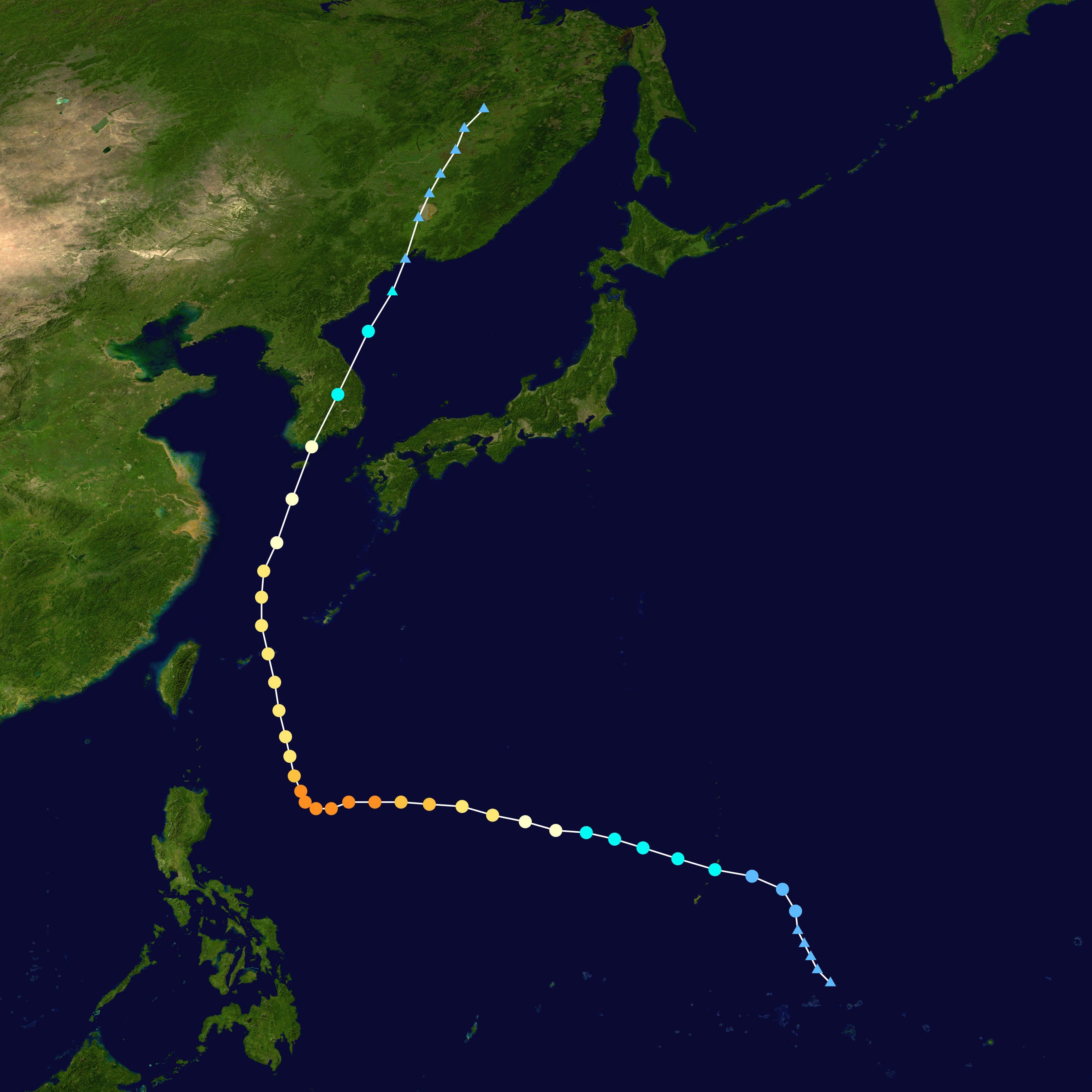
Path of Typhoon Thelma.

- In 1987, floods caused by Typhoon Thelma killed 123 people and caused $272 million in damages.

== 2000s ==
- In 2002, Typhoon Rusa caused mass flooding across Korea.

== 2010s ==
- The 2011 Seoul floods killed 69 people and caused hundreds of millions of damage.
- The 2014 August series of floods killed at least 5 people.

== 2020s ==
- From late June to mid-August 2020, heavy rains fell intensively or locally across the Korean Peninsula, causing a lot of damage.
- On August 8, 2022, 100-300 mm of heavy rain per day fell in the metropolitan area.
- From early June through July 2023, heavy rainfall resulted in severe flooding and landslides, killing at least 41 people.
- In early July 2024, torrential downpours caused significant flooding in southern regions of South Korea, killing at least four people.
- In late July 2024, heavy rainfall struck northwestern North Korea, flooding about 4,100 homes with estimates by South Korean media of ~1,500 dead or missing due to flooding.

== See also ==
- North Korea flooding (disambiguation)
