= North Korea flooding =

North Korea flooding may refer to:

- Floods during the North Korean famine (1994–1998)
- 2006 North Korean floods
- 2007 North Korean floods
- 2012 North Korean floods
- 2016 North Korean floods
- 2018 North Korean floods
- 2020 Korean floods
- 2024 Korea floods
