= South Korean floods =

South Korean floods may refer to:

- 2014 South Korea floods
- 2022 South Korean floods
- 2023 South Korean floods
- 2025 South Korea floods
