= 2025 South Korea floods =

Natural disaster in South Korea

- Cause: Heavy rain

Meteorological history
- Duration: 16 July – 14 August 2025

Flood
- Maximum rainfall: 426 mm (16.8 in) in Gwangju on 17 July

Overall effects
- Fatalities: 23
- Injuries: 4+
- Missing: 9
- Evacuated: 18,075+
- Areas affected: South Korea
- Power outages: 45,000+

Three separate periods of heavy rains in July and August 2025 caused extensive flooding across South Korea, leading to the deaths of at least 23 people with a further nine reported missing. There was widespread damage across the country, with a number of settlements being severely damaged by landslides and over 18,000 people being evacuated.

== Impact ==
=== 16–21 July ===
By 17 July, four people had been killed and 1,300 evacuated by rescuers, with many injured people reported including two people with hypothermia and two with leg injures. The government raised the weather-related disaster alert to its highest level as the weather agency described the disaster as a once-in-a-century event. In half a day over 400 mm (16 in) of rain fell in Seosan, whilst a total of 426 mm (16.8 in) fell in Gwangju on 17 July.

In Gapyeong County, at least two people have died and five are missing after a landslide engulfed houses and left 24 people stranded at a campsite where a man was also killed. Around 13,000 people were evacuated across the country. Six people were killed and seven are missing in Sancheong County, whilst an entire village in central Chungcheong was covered with debris from a landslide. It was reported that over 41,000 properties had lost power whilst thousands of buildings and roads were damaged by floodwaters; swathes of farmland were also damaged and lots of livestock died.

By 22 July the death toll had risen to 19, with a further nine people missing — president Lee Jae Myung said told public officials to "spare no effort" in the search for them and on damage recovery. The Ministry of the Interior and Safety said 2,549 people remained displaced, whilst some 3,776 buildings including factories, homes and shops needed to be cleared of debris such as mud and water. The IFRC reported that around 14,575 people had been evacuated from 15 provinces and over 6,700 buildings were affected.

On 23 July, K-water said it had mitigated downstream flooding despite rainfall exceeding dam capacities, with the spillways of only two dams being partially opened; the other 18 dams retained all water without discharging.

=== 3–4 August ===
The second period of flooding came after heavy rain between 3 and 4 August in the country's southern regions, with one person being killed in Muan County and over 2,500 people evacuated from the provinces of Busan, Gwangju, North Gyeongsang, South Chungcheong, South Gyeongsang and South Jeolla.

=== 13–14 August ===
Heavy rain between 13 and 14 August led to severe flooding in the Gyeonggi region, with three people being killed in Gimpo, Incheon and Pocheon whilst around 1,000 people were evacuated in Seoul and 145 being rescued. Around 4,000 people were affected by power outages and hundreds of homes and roads were damaged.

== See also ==
- 2020 Korean floods
- 2022 South Korea floods
- 2023 South Korea floods
- 2024 Korea floods
- Climate change in South Korea
