= 2006 North Korean floods =

Weather event in North Korea

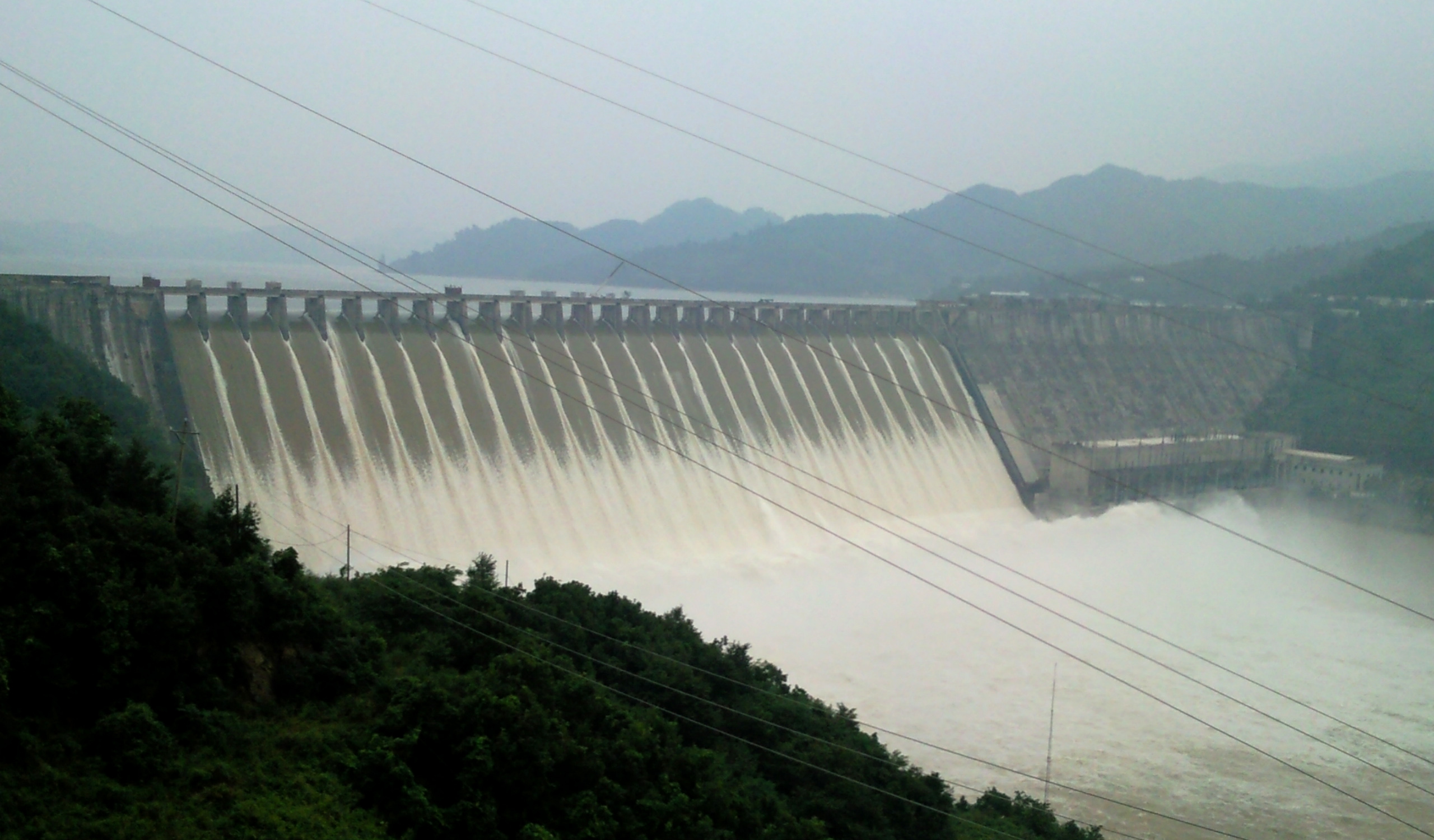
- Water management infrastructure such as the Supung Dam proved insufficient to hold back rain water in North Korea

Meteorological history
- Duration: July 2006

Overall effects
- Fatalities: Hundreds killed and missing (government), 151 killed (Red Cross), 549 killed, 295 missing (Choson Shinbo), 54,700 killed or missing (Good Friends)
- Areas affected: North Korea

Flooding in North Korea in July 2006 caused extensive damage and loss of life, although reports differ about its extent.

== Death toll estimates ==
- Hundreds killed and missing (government figures)
- 151 killed, 29 missing (International Federation of Red Cross)
- 154 killed, 127 missing (United Nations)
- 549 people killed, 295 missing and 3,043 injured (Choson Shinbo)
- 54,700 killed or missing (South Korean aid group Good Friends)

== Overview ==
A statement by the official Korean Central News Agency on August 3 described the events as "claiming huge human and material losses." Chosŏn Shinbo, a newspaper published by a pro-North Korean association linked to the North, said in early August that the floods killed at least 549 people, left 295 others missing, and left 60,000 homeless.

The South Korean aid group Good Friends estimates that the flooding left 58,000 people dead or missing and that some 1.5 million people may have been made homeless and in a rare move North Korea asked for aid from South Korea. South Korea pledged $20 million to North Korea to help with the flooding. There has been no statement from the North Korean government on whether the reports from the South Korean aid group are true.

According to cattlenetwork.com, the greatest flooding was experienced in the Kangwon, Kaesong, South Pyongan, South Hamgyong and South Hwanghae provinces, with substantial damage to agricultural land. The U.S. based Radio Free Asia reported the International Federation of Red Cross and Red Crescent Societies as saying that in some locations "whole villages have been swept away and essential public facilities (such as clinics) destroyed, while widespread damage to roads and bridges has displaced and stranded many people", that over 7,000 homes were completely destroyed, with almost 13,000 families left homeless, and that South Pyongan, North Hwanghae, Kangwon, and South Hamgyong were the worst-affected provinces.

North Korea cancelled its gymnastics show Arirang Festival in order to recover from the flooding.

Both the United Nations and the South Korean Red Cross offered food aid to the affected regions, though according to a report by Associated Press, Pyŏngyang turned these offers down.

== See also ==
- Weather of 2016
- North Korean famine
- 2007 North Korean floods
- 2011 Seoul floods
- 2012 North Korean floods
- 2018 North Korean floods
- 2024 Korea floods

== Sources ==
- DPRK floods Information Bulletin, Red Cross, July 26, 2006
- Radio Free Asia story: U.N. Offers Food Aid to Flood-Hit North Korea, July 26, 2006
- ABC News story: N Korean flood toll thought to be 10,000, August 2, 2006
- N.Korea rejects flood aid offer, Associated Press, August 2, 2006
- Korean Central News Agency (official North Korean government news agency) Kim Jong Il Receives Message of Sympathy from Indonesian President, August 3, 2006
- BBC News story: North Korea flooding 'kills 549', August 7, 2006; reporting the Chosŏn Shinbo story
- cattlenetwork.com story: Flooding Reduces Rice Crop in North Korea, August 14, 2006
- China Post story (crediting Reuters): S. Korea Red Cross plans rice aid for North, August 15, 2006
- ABC News story (crediting Associated Press) Group: 54,700 Dead, Missing in N. Korea, August 16, 2006
