= China–Indonesia maritime incidents near the Natuna Islands =

Series of encounters in disputed waters

A series of encounters between Indonesian maritime authorities and Chinese fishing boats and government vessels have occurred north of the Natuna Islands, in southern South China Sea, since 2010. Although China recognizes Indonesia's sovereignty over Natuna Islands, the two countries have disagreed over maritime rights in nearby waters. Indonesia asserts exclusive economic zone (EEZ) and continental-shelf rights under the United Nations Convention on the Law of the Sea (UNCLOS). China claims maritime rights on the basis of its nine-dash line.

Notable confrontations took place in 2016, December 2019, 2021 and October 2024, involving fisheries enforcement, coast guard interventions, and patrols near Indonesian offshore energy projects. Natuna fishermen have also reported being driven away from their fishing grounds and intimidated by larger Chinese vessels.

== Background ==
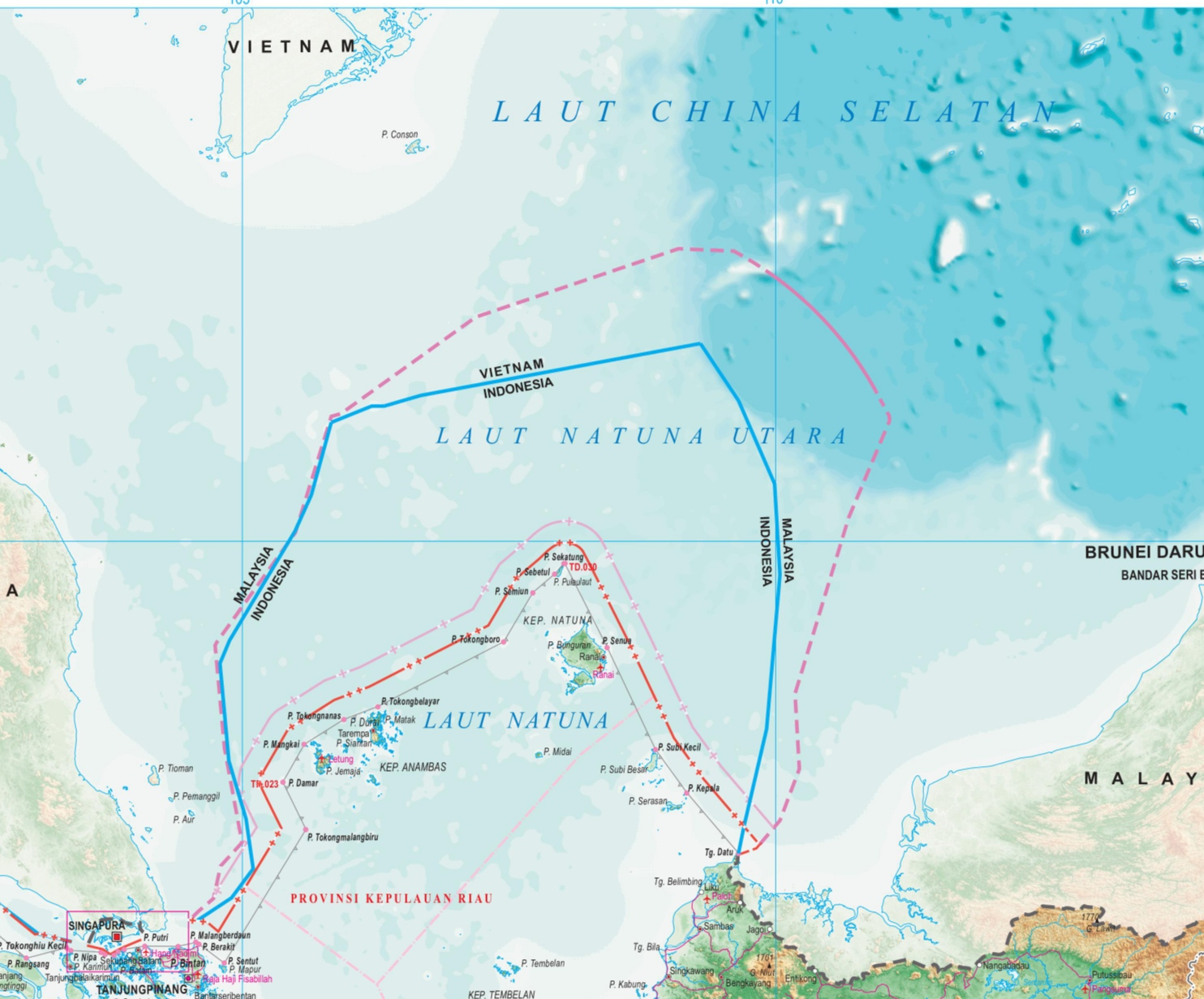
Indonesia's 2017 map showing the "North Natuna Sea" (Laut Natuna Utara) designation

The Natuna Islands are part of Indonesia's Riau Islands province. Under the UNCLOS, Indonesia is allowed to regulate fishing and use natural resources in its EEZ. While Indonesia has rights over the continental shelf, including resources on and beneath the seabed, these rights do not give Indonesia complete maritime sovereignty. Foreign ships generally retain navigation freedoms in an EEZ, but unauthorized fishing is not permitted and marine scientific research generally requires the coastal state's consent. Indonesia is allowed to board and detain vessels to enforce its fisheries laws.

China's nine-dash line extends into waters north of Natuna where Indonesia has resource rights. China recognizes Indonesia's sovereignty over the Natuna Islands but claims overlapping maritime rights and traditional fishing grounds in nearby waters. Indonesia has rejected China's claim of corresponding rights within its EEZ.

The Philippines initiated the South China Sea Arbitration against China in January 2013; the case was heard by a tribunal established under UNCLOS, with the Permanent Court of Arbitration acting as its registry. In its July 2016 award, the tribunal ruled that China's claims to historic resource rights within its nine-dash line had no legal effect beyond the maritime entitlements allowed by UNCLOS. China rejected the award on jurisdictional grounds, whereas Indonesia was not a party to the case. In a May 2020 note to the United Nations, Indonesia reiterated its rejection of China's historic-rights claims.

== Maritime incidents ==
=== Early encounters ===
Between 2010 and 2013, three confrontations occurred when Indonesia attempted to enforce its fishing laws by detaining Chinese fishing vessels, which was met with interventions by Chinese law enforcement vessels.

=== 2016 fisheries confrontations ===
On 19 March 2016, Indonesian fisheries officers detained eight crew members of Kway Fey 10078, a Chinese fishing vessel suspected of fishing without authorization in the EEZ. Indonesian authorities said a Chinese Coast Guard ship struck the detained fishing boat as officers tried to tow it to port, which prevented its removal. Indonesia protested the intervention. China described the waters as traditional Chinese fishing grounds.

On 27 May, the Indonesian Navy frigate KRI Oswald Siahaan intercepted the Chinese fishing vessel Gui Bei Yu 27088 on suspicion of unauthorized fishing. Indonesian accounts describe warning shots and the detention of eight crew members. One Indonesian naval commander said the nearby Chinese coast guard ship appeared to protect the fishing boat, while another said it had not obstructed the arrest. Indonesia said it would not lodge a diplomatic protest.

On 17 June, Indonesian naval ships pursued Chinese fishing boats on suspicion of fishing illegally in Indonesia's EEZ north of Natuna. After warning shots, the Navy detained one boat and its seven crew members. Chinese coast guard vessels approached and requested its release. China's claims that Indonesian authorities shot at and injured a fisherman were denied by Indonesia, which said all detained crew members were unharmed.

=== December 2019–January 2020 standoff ===
In late 2019, Chinese fishing vessels escorted by Chinese coast guard ships reportedly operated for weeks within Indonesia's EEZ north of the Natuna Islands. Indonesian Maritime Security Agency (Bakamla) reported observing 63 Chinese fishing vessels and two coast guard ships between 19 and 24 December 2019. Indonesia protested the fishing activities and deployed additional patrol vessels and military forces in the area. The Asia Maritime Transparency Initiative (AMTI) used ships' automatic identification system (AIS) broadcasts to track movements of Chinese government vessels, including temporary departures and returns by coast guard ships. AMTI also suggested that Indonesian patrols may have influenced some of those movements.

=== September 2020 coast guard encounter ===
In September 2020, the Indonesian Maritime Security Agency patrol ship KN Pulau Nipah-321 shadowed Chinese coast guard ship 5204 for more than two days within Indonesia's EEZ. The Chinese crew asserted a right to patrol waters inside the nine-dash line. Indonesian authorities drove off the Chinese ship.

=== 2021 Tuna Block drilling ===
A standoff between the two countries started in June 2021 over the Noble Clyde Boudreaux, an Indonesian rig drilling two appraisal wells in Indonesia's Tuna Block, approximately 140 nautical miles (260 km; 160 mi) north of Natuna Besar island. Subsequently, Chinese coast guard patrol ships were deployed near the rig, as China reportedly asked Indonesia to stop drilling, claiming maritime jurisdiction in the area. AMTI documented Chinese coast guard patrols, seabed survey work by the Chinese research vessel Haiyang Dizhi 10, and close encounters with Indonesian patrol vessels. Indonesia continued drilling amid tensions, and the appraisal drilling was completed in November 2021.

=== October 2024 seismic survey ===
In October 2024, Chinese coast guard vessels approached the Geo Coral, which was conducting the Arwana three-dimensional seismic survey for an offshore energy project of Indonesia's state-owned corporation Pertamina in the North Natuna Sea. Indonesia's maritime security agency reported the approach as interference with survey activity. AMTI tracked Chinese coast guard ship 5302 shadowing the survey until ship 5402 took over around 19 October. On 21 October, the Indonesian patrol vessel Tanjung Datu shadowed ship 5402, whose crew reportedly asserted Chinese jurisdiction over the area. Chinese officials said the ship's activities were "routine patrols". Chinese coast guard vessels later re-entered the EEZ, following Indonesian efforts to escort them away. The Geo Coral continued the survey, basis of imagery from 27 October.

== Effects on fishing communities ==
Natuna fishermen operating smaller boats have described being told by foreign fishing crews to leave familiar fishing grounds, being steered away by larger foreign vessels, and losing potential catches. In a 2016 interview with ABC News, fisherman Syahrizal said he was "very angry" about China's claims to the surrounding waters and that "our catch can't compete with what they've got using their trawls."

On 8 September 2022, Natuna fisherman Dedi stated that the Chinese coast guard ship 5403 crossed his path and circled his boat for approximately 15 minutes, which he perceived as intimidation. Mongabay published an image from his video and the coordinates he recorded. An Indonesia Ocean Justice Initiative researcher said satellite and vessel-tracking data corroborated the patrol ship's presence in the area. In a 2023 Channel NewsAsia interview, Dedi said foreign crews told him to leave his usual fishing grounds, and described a Chinese coast guard ship approaching him and showing him a map of the nine-dash line.

In June 2026, Natuna fishermen reported further encounters with foreign fishing vessels and coast guard ships, including vessels from China. According to local officials, inadequate communications equipment was an obstacle to reporting incidents at sea.

== Indonesian responses and diplomacy ==
In response to the encounters, Indonesia has lodged multiple diplomatic protests and increased patrols. In July 2017, it adopted the official map designation "North Natuna Sea" for waters north of the Natuna Islands.

During Indonesia President Prabowo Subianto's visit to Beijing in November 2024, the governments of China and Indonesia issued a joint statement which included a reference to prospective maritime cooperation in "areas of overlapping claims". Indonesian legal experts questioned whether the wording suggested recognition of Chinese maritime claims. Indonesia's Foreign Ministry reaffirmed that Indonesia did not recognize China's nine-dash-line claim or any overlapping maritime jurisdiction with China near Natuna.

== See also ==
- China–Indonesia relations
- South China Sea Arbitration
- Nine-dash line
