= 2007 North Korean floods =

Meteorological history
- Duration: August 15–31, 2007

Overall effects
- Fatalities: 600 dead, thousands injured
- Damage: $22.5 million
- Areas affected: Most within the southern half of the country

Flooding in North Korea in August 2007 caused extensive damage and loss of life. The flooding affected most of the southern half of the country including the capital and some of its most productive agricultural regions. Aid officials feared the loss of crop land could seriously hinder the North's ability to feed its people, causing widespread famine.

== History ==
On August 15, 2007, North Korea announced it had been hit extremely hard by floods after a solid week of torrential rains, and that it desperately needed assistance from the outside world. The previous year, the country also experienced massive flooding when torrential rains in July left hundreds if not thousands dead. The difference is this time Pyongyang reacted quickly to the disaster, requesting help while the waters were still high, rather than keeping silent as long as possible, as it has done in the past.

Television footage from North Korea showed citizens in Pyongyang wading in knee- and waist-deep waters along the capital's grand boulevards. Government officials invited foreign diplomats in Pyongyang to venture out to the countryside to view first-hand the devastation wrought by the relentless rains.

On August 27, North Korea said it had suspended its yearly showcase Arirang mass games. The performance resumed after the flood damage was cleared away.

By August 31, North Korea reported recovering from devastating floods thanks to vigorous work by its citizens and officials. Railway services had resumed with many sections of broken track restored. Telecommunications workers were reported restoring destroyed or submerged electrical cables. Yet, the dispatch made no mention of foreign assistance. The country's leader Kim Jong-Il thanked the leaders of 11 countries on September 11 for their help in flood relief, except South Korea even though they sent 37.4 billion won (39.8 million dollars) of relief aid.

== Farmland ==
The flooding submerged, buried or washed away more than 11 percent of the country's rice and corn fields. The North is especially susceptible to bad weather because of a vicious circle where people strip hillsides of natural vegetation to create more arable land to grow food — increasing the risk of floods. On August 16, 2007, Paul Lysley, spokesperson for the WFP Asia, has estimated the damage to crops alone at 450,000 tons.

The United Nations' Office for the Coordination of Humanitarian Affairs reported some 223,381 hectares of farmland were damaged, with about 20 percent of North Korea's paddy fields and 15 percent of its corn fields flooded or washed away.

== Relief aid ==
On August 17, 2007, Seoul, South Korea decided to provide $7.5 million in flood relief to North Korea. Initial aid shipments included noodles, drinking water, powdered milk, blankets and medicines. On August 23, 2007, a convoy of 34 trucks carrying emergency food rations, water and other goods left South Korea for the North. Seoul has pledged to provide 7.1 billion won ($7.6 million) in aid.

NGOs such as the Red Cross also asked people to raise funds because they feared a humanitarian catastrophe.

On August 29, Japan considered sending humanitarian aid to North Korea to help it recover from devastating floods. Sending aid would be a reversal for Japan, which has previously linked aid to resolving a row over North Korea's abduction of Japanese citizens. Japan has not sent any humanitarian aid to North Korea since late 2004, in protest at a lack of progress over Japanese nationals kidnapped by Pyongyang in the late 1970s and early 1980s.

The United Nations requested US$14 million to provide North Korea with food, medicine, drinking water and other emergency goods. The United States pledged at least US$100,000 for the U.N.

== See also ==
- North Korean famine
- 2006 North Korean floods
- 2012 North Korean floods
- 2018 North Korean floods
- 2024 Korea floods
