= 2018 North Korean floods =

28 August floods

- Location of North Korea
- Date: 28 August 2018-??
- Location: North Korea
- Deaths: 76 killed, 75 missing

The 2018 North Korean floods began on 28 August 2018, killing at least 76 people, leaving around 75 more missing, destroying more than 800 buildings, and causing about 10,700 people to become homeless. It was in part caused by Tropical Storm Soulik.

The most affected area were the North and South Hwanghae provinces, where volunteers from the national Red Cross conducted search and rescue operations. Landslides also occurred after the floods, and thousands of people were in need of health services, shelter, food, safe drinking water and sanitation.

== See also ==
- 2006 North Korean floods
- 2007 North Korean floods
- 2012 North Korean floods
- 2016 North Korean floods
- 2017 Pacific typhoon season
- 2024 Korea floods
