= 2022 South Korea floods =

Natural disaster in South Korea

- Date: 8 August 2022
- Location: South Korea
- Type: flooding
- Deaths: 9
- Injuries: 0

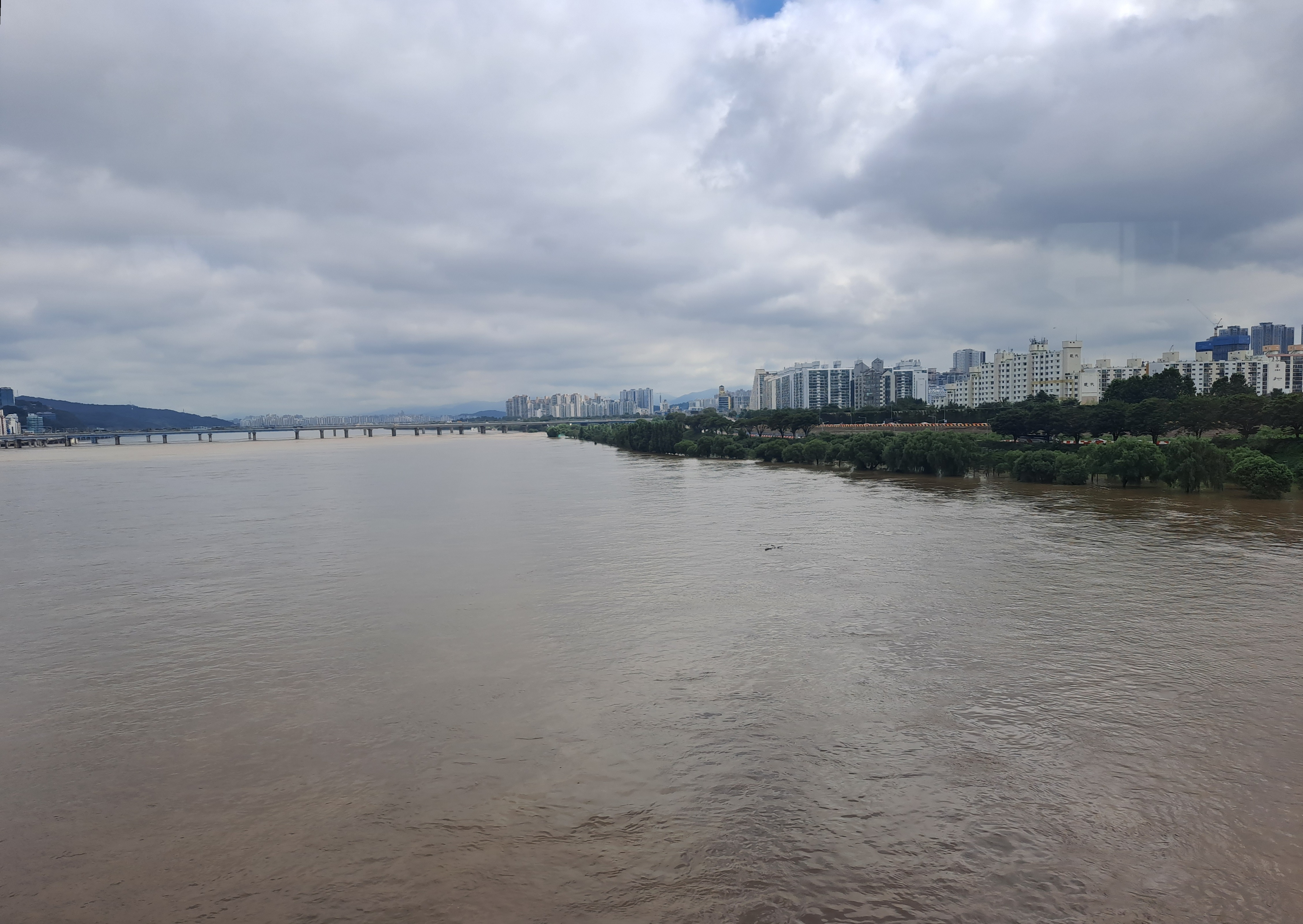
On 10 August 2022, the Han River swelled due to torrential rain.

On 8 August 2022, large scale floods hit the capital of South Korea, Seoul, especially affecting Gangnam District and its surrounding areas. It was preceded by the highest rainfall in 80 years. 2,800 buildings were damaged and at least 9 people were killed. 163 people in Seoul were made homeless. Landslide warnings were issued in 50 cities and towns. Power cuts were widespread. President Yoon Suk-yeol warned the public of more rainfall. The highest recorded rainfall was 17 inches (43 cm) in Seoul's Dongjak district.

== Response ==
Many celebrities donated money to help the relief efforts through the Hope Bridge Korea Disaster Relief Association and the Seoul Community Chest of Korea (Seoul Fruit of Korea) including; Hong Soo-hyun, Im Si-wan, Jinyoung, Kim Hei-sook, Kim Hye-soo, Kim Jin-woo, Yoo Byung-jae, Kang Tae-oh, Lee Young-ji, Yoon Se-ah, Psy, Arin, Kang Seung-yoon, Yoo Jae-suk, Kim Go-eun, Lee Sung-kyung, Jay Park, Mijoo, IU, Bae Suzy, Ahn Hyo-seop, J-Hope, Kim Eun-sook, Kim Se-jeong, Ahn Young-mi, Lee Young-ae, Shin Hye-sun and Han Ji-min.

== See also ==
- 2020 South Korean floods
- 2023 South Korea floods
- 2024 Korea floods
