= 2012 North Korean floods =

Natural disaster in North Korea

- Location of North Korea
- Date: 19 July 2012 – 17 September 2012
- Location: North Korea
- Deaths: 330+ killed, 144 injured, 234,000+ homeless

The 2012 North Korean floods began in mid-July 2012 when Tropical Storm Khanun affected parts of the country, killing at least 88 people and leaving more than 62,000 people homeless. Torrential rains on 29 and 30 July 2012 worsened the situation, causing additional damage and casualties and forcing the government to request international assistance. Severe rainfall also affected the southern region of North Korea in August, killing at least six.

== Tropical Storm Khanun ==
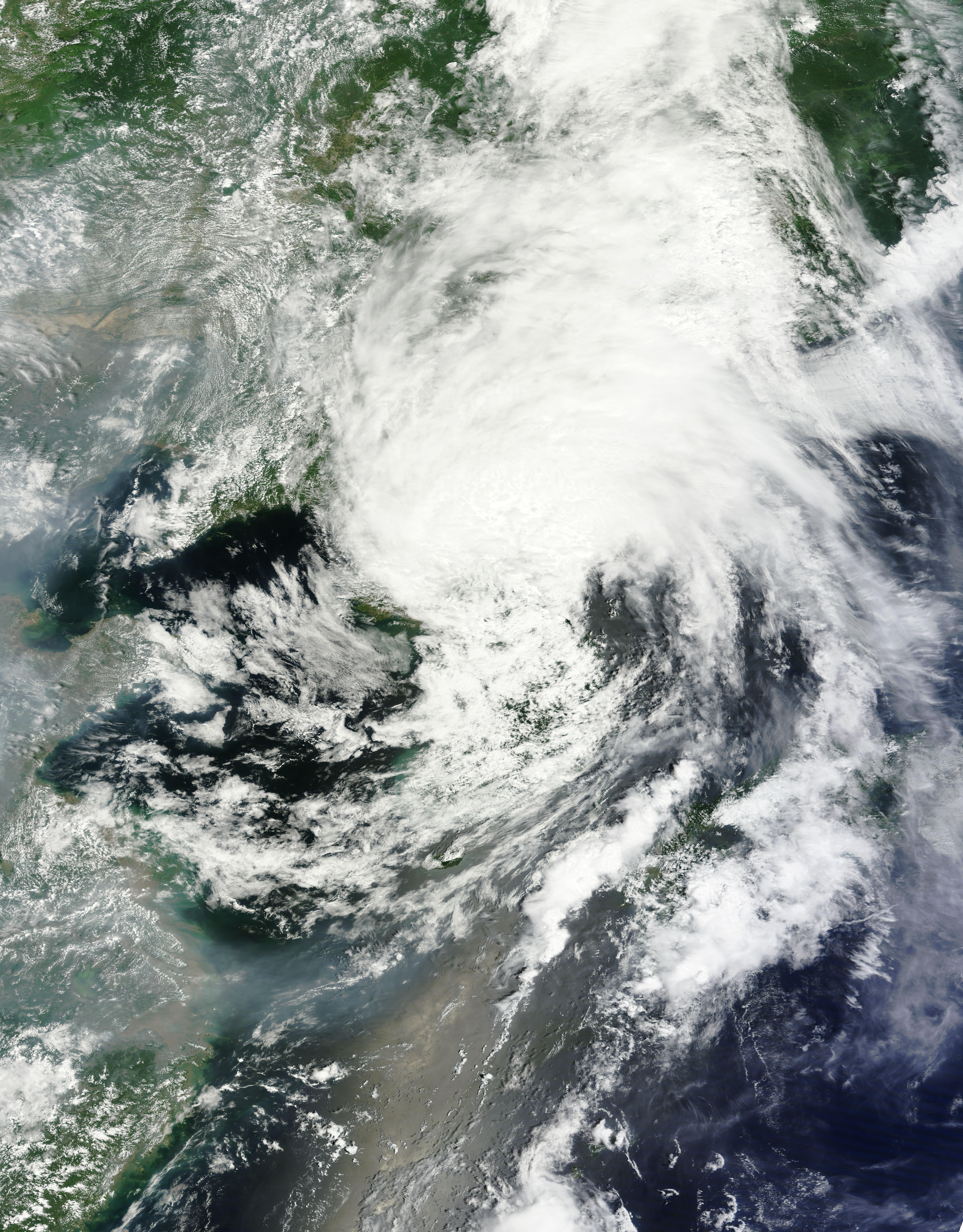
Tropical Storm Khanun over North Korea on 19 July

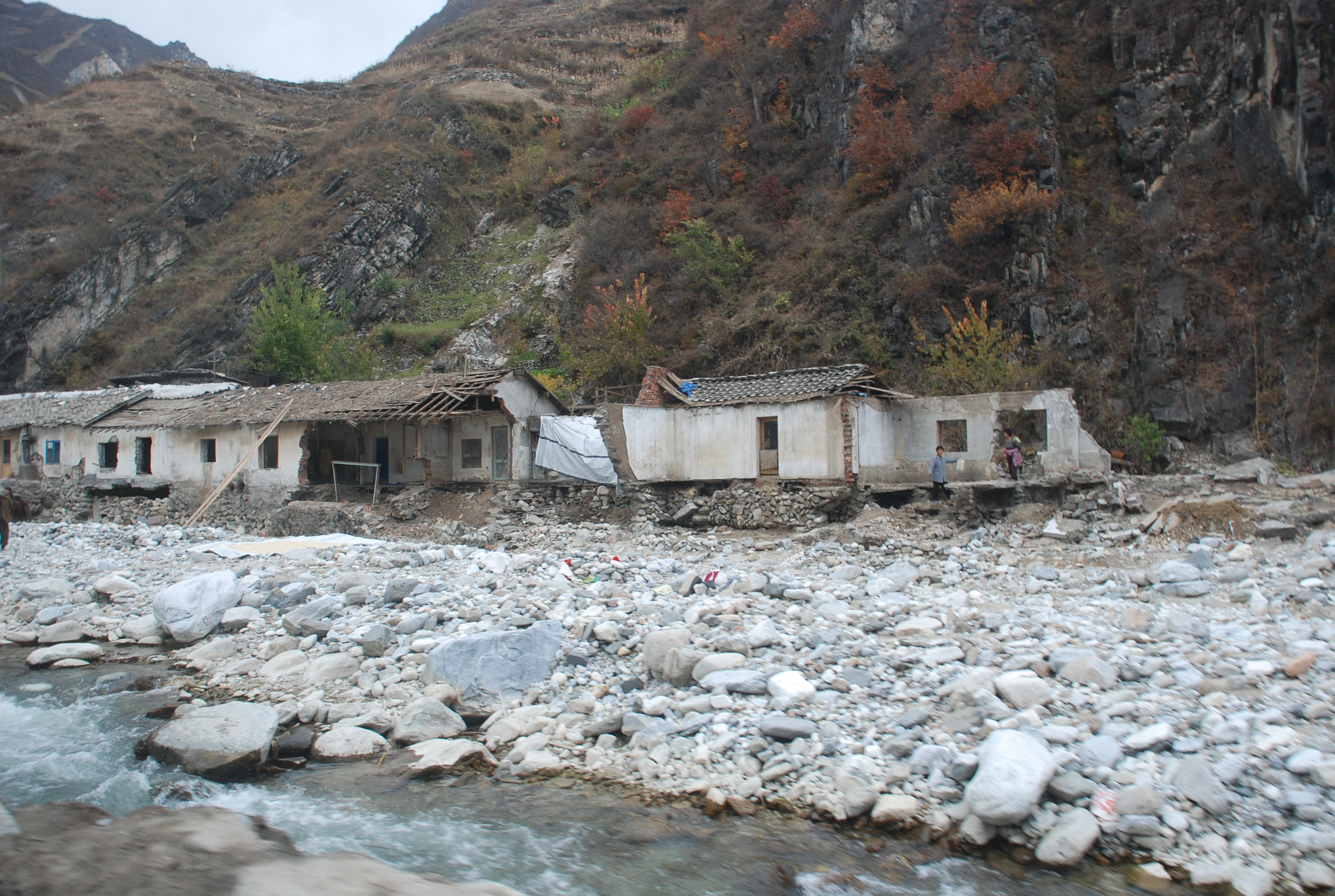
Houses in South Hamgyong Province damaged by floods in July 2012

Khanun made landfall in South Korea on 19 July and weakened as it moved over North Korea before dissipating over China. The government on 29 July increased the number of fatalities as a result of flooding caused by Khanun from 8 to 88, with an additional 134 injured. The biggest loss of human life was in two counties of South Pyongan province. At least 62,900 were made homeless by the flooding, while more than 30,000 hectares of land for growing crops were submerged and will add to growing fears of another looming famine in the country. Three hundred public buildings and 60 factories were damaged during the storm.

== July 29-30 rains ==
Torrential rains hit North Korea again on 29 and 30 July, with approximately 442 millimeters (17.4 inches) of rain recorded in Pakchon County of North Phyongan Province during a 24-hour period from 6 a.m. local time 29 July. The rains worsened the flood situation caused by Khanun, destroying railways, roads, bridges and 'many' dwelling houses. The government said many residents in the affected region were left homeless, but no figures have yet been released about damage and casualties.

The North Korean government has asked assistance from resident United Nations agencies, the Red Cross, and European Union Program Support Units. The North Korean government also supported two inter-agency assessment missions in South Pyongan and Kangwon provinces on 31 July.

On 1 August, KCNA announced that North and South Pyongan provinces and Nyongwon county were severely affected by floods, landslides and thunderbolts, which destroyed 4,900 dwellings, submerged 8,530 homes and destroyed or submerged 200 public buildings and factories. KCNA also reported significant damage to coal mining and processing infrastructure in the area. Some 179,000 tonnes of coal were washed away, along with about 200 pieces of equipment at the Kaechon and Tokchon mining complexes. Railways serving the complexes were also damaged. State media reported at least 31 were killed by landslides and lightning, with 16 others missing.

On 4 August, the North Korean government said the death toll from both Khanun and the torrential rains in late July had risen to 169, with around 400 others missing. It said 8,600 houses were destroyed and 44,000 houses were flooded, leaving more than 212,200 people homeless.

== 17–20 August rains ==
Torrential rains hit North Korea again between late 17 August and early 20 August, causing at least six deaths and destroying more than 530 buildings in the southern region of the country. Three people were killed in North Hwanghae Province, three people were also killed in South Phyongan Province, and an unknown number of people were killed in South Hwanghae Province.

== Typhoon Bolaven ==
In North Korea, heavy rains from the storm triggered significant flooding and many landslides in late August. In South Hamgyong Province, at least 100 homes were flooded by the storm. KCNA reported wind speeds of more than 108 km/h (67 mph) in North and South Hwanghae, South Hamgyong, South Pyongan and the city of Nampho, and waves as high as 1.11 m (3.6 ft) in the sea of Kimchaek. Widespread damage took place throughout the country as a result of the storm. At least 6,700 homes were destroyed and approximately 101,000 hectares (250,000 acres) of crop and rice fields were flooded. Additionally, 16,730 trees were downed and 880 public and industrial buildings were severely damaged. In all, at least 48 people were killed and 21,800 others were left homeless.

== Typhoon Sanba ==
Torrential rains from South Korea on 17 September made a landfall that spread beyond the Korean DMZ Zone to North Korea.

== See also ==
- 2006 North Korean floods
- 2007 North Korean floods
- 2018 North Korean floods
- 2024 Korea floods
