= 2020 Korea floods =

2020 floods in Korea

2020 Korean floods
- Date: June 2020 – August 16, 2020
- Location: Korean Peninsula, especially southern South Korea
- Deaths: 32 (As of 10 August 2020)
- Property damage: ₩1.04 trillion (US$875 million)

Between June and August 2020, floods severely impacted large areas of both North and South Korea due to heavy rains of the regional rainy season, primarily in the far southern parts of the Korean Peninsula. These floods are closely related to ones across China and in Kyushu, Japan. As of 10 August 2020, 32 people have died in South Korea as a result. The Ministry of the Interior and Safety estimated the damage to be ₩1.04 trillion (US$875 million).

== Events ==
The monsoon rainy season began in South Korea in late June. In early July, Busan was flooded following heavy rains. Late July again saw heavy downpours and strong winds hit southeastern areas of South Korea, killing several people and causing more damage. In mid-July, a Korea Meteorological Administration official stated that "the rainy season began on Jeju Island on June 10 and in the southern and central regions on June 24. Generally, the wet season ends in those areas in late July, though the exact period differs from region to region."

August, however, witnessed a continuation of the seasonal rains with flooding all over South Korea, while most damage and fatalities continued to be in the southern areas. Evacuees and local officials raised concerns regarding emergency shelter given the simultaneously ongoing COVID-19 pandemic.

The floods worsened as Typhoon Hagupit and Tropical Storm Jangmi dropped more rainfall over the Korean Peninsula in August 2020.

As of 8 August 2020, the 2020 rainy season is the second longest on record after the 2013 season.

On 3 August, the North Korean State Hydro-Meteorological Administration, issued a red alert over extreme rainfall in parts of the south and northwestern regions of North Korea. Accurate information on the effects of the rains in North Korea is hard to come by, but the North is typically highly susceptible to seasonal flood damage. The Korean Central News Agency reported damage in North Korea, but no fatalities. Supreme Leader Kim Jong-un was reported on 7 August to have inspected flood-damaged areas of North Hwanghae Province, adjacent to South Korea, among them in village of Taechong-ri, Unpa County. There are concerns that the late flooding in 2020 could interfere with the North's food harvest and precipitate a threat to the state's food security. Further reconstruction works took place in Kangbuk-ri, Kumchon County. On October that year, President of the Presidium of the Supreme People's Assembly, Choe Ryong-hae visited the village Samjigang-ri in Chaeryong County to inspect reconstruction efforts.

== See also ==
- 2020 China floods
- 2020 Kyushu floods
- 2022 South Korean floods
- 2024 Korea floods
- North Korea flooding (disambiguation)
