= Kim Hei-sook =

South Korean academic and university administrator

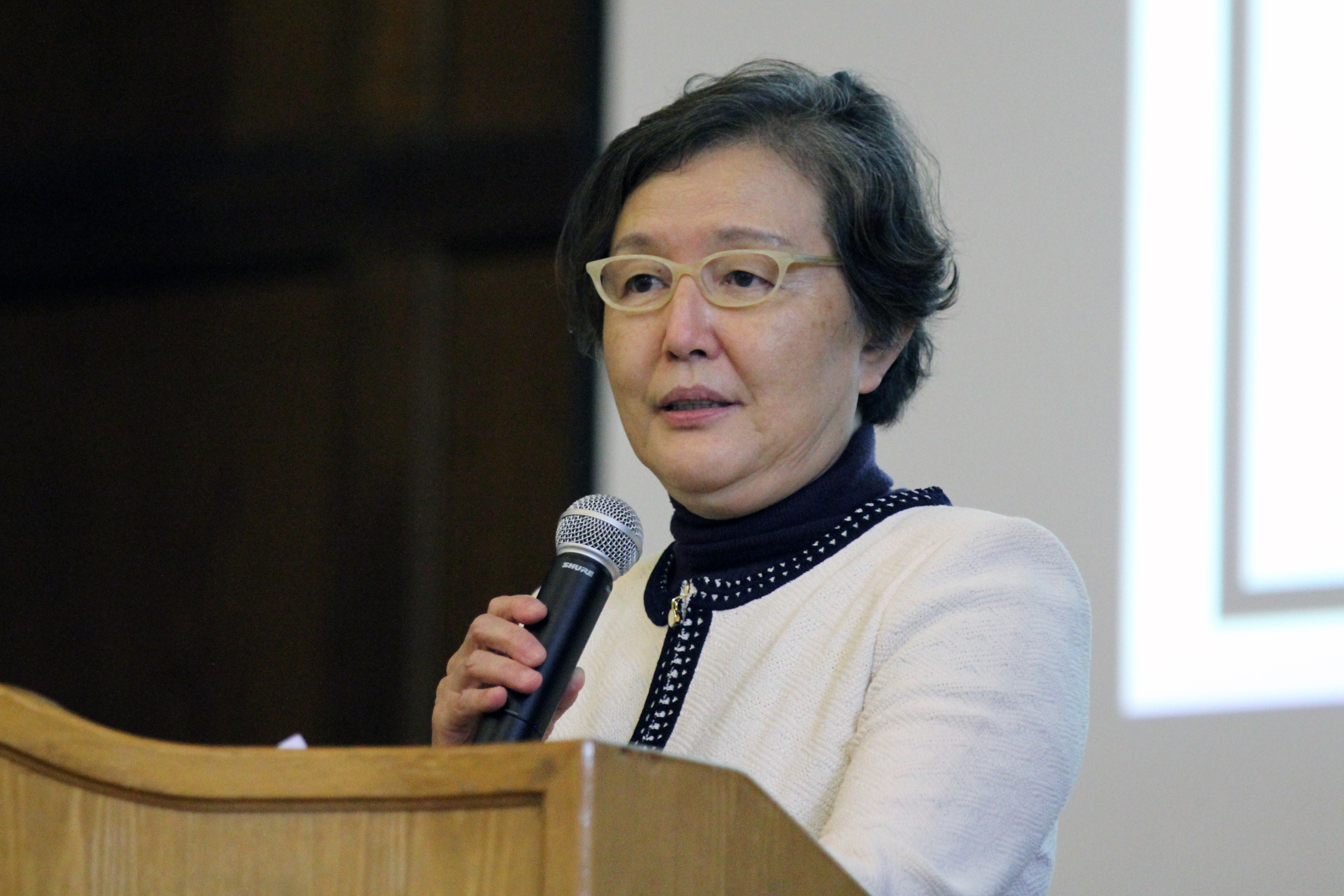

Korean name
- Hangul: 김혜숙
- Hanja: 金惠淑
- RR: Gim Hyesuk
- MR: Kim Hyesuk

Kim Hei-sook (Korean: 김혜숙; born c. 1955) is a South Korean academic and university administrator. She has been a professor of philosophy at Ewha Womans University since 1987, and was elected president of the university in 2017.

== Education ==
Kim began her studies at Ewha, graduating with a Bachelor of Arts in English literature in 1976 and a Master of Arts in Christian philosophy in 1979. She completed a doctorate at the University of Chicago in 1987, with a thesis on epistemology. Kim subsequently returned to Ewha to take up a professorship in the philosophy department. She specialises in the philosophy of art, epistemology, and women's studies, and has served as an associate editor of the International Feminist Journal of Politics. She won a Fulbright Scholarship in 1995.

== Career ==
As co-chair of the faculty council, Kim was one of the leaders of protests against Choi Kyung-hee, who resigned as president of Ewha in October 2016 over corruption charges and was later sentenced to imprisonment. In early 2017, Kim was elected as Choi's replacement as university president, winning the first-ever direct election for the post. In a ballot of the university's students, faculty, and alumni, she won 33.9 percent of the first-round vote and 57.3 percent in the final round. The election process was somewhat controversial, as there was initially an age limit of 61 for candidates; some commentators accused the university board of setting this limit specifically to exclude Kim, who was 62. Kim took office on 31 May 2017, to a term expiring on 28 February 2021. During her election campaign, she promised to "return Ewha to its original state and restore its honor". She become president of Ewha in 2017 and stepped down in 2021.
