= 2014 South Korea floods =

Series of floods in South Korea

The 2014 South Korea floods were a series of floods in late August 2014 caused by heavy rainfall around the Honam and Yeongnam. This flood season killed about 10 people, and caused many accidents during 18 August to 25 August. In some places, The rain fell over 50 mm in an hour.

== Cause of the rainfall ==
Primarily, the Jangma and other heavy rain seasons occur during June to July. But this rain occurred in August because the heavy rainfall moved to South Korea.

== August 18 ==
The heavy rainfall passed between North Pacific High and Siberian High, so the rain started to fall on Honam and Jeju Island. In Yeonggwang, nine houses were flooded because of the rain, and many other accidents occurred. A few hours later, the cloud moved to the Yeongnam. There were many accidents and records in Yeongnam: 284.5 mm of precipitation in Yangsan, a sand-collapsing accident in Geoje, and two collapsing accidents in Busan.

=== Precipitation records ===
- Daily precipitation
  - Yangsan 284.5 mm
  - Busan 249 mm
  - Gochang 230.6 mm
  - Ulsan 211 mm
  - Jeongeup 193 mm
- Hourly precipitation
  - Yeonggwang 59.5 mm
  - Yangsan 50 mm
  - Ulsan 48.3 mm
  - Suncheon 47.5 mm
  - Gimhae 35.5 mm

== August 20 ==
The rainfall weakened on August 19, so there was less precipitation except in Jeju Island, Gangwon and Gyeongbuk. But it strengthened the next day, so rain fell in Jeju island and South Sea seaside. The rain was less than on August 18, but many accidents occurred because the ground was weakened.

== August 21 ==
On August 21, the rain was expanded to Gyeonggi and Gangwon because the rainfall moved north. A reservoir in Yeongcheon was destroyed because of the rain, and in Daegu, one child disappeared, and another died because the river overflowed.

== August 25 ==
=== Flooding of the bus ===
At 14:20, the bus in the Masanhappo-gu was flooded. It was going to the Jindong-Pachulso, but the road was restricted because of the rain, so the bus took the detour to farm road. In the process of detouring, the bus fell into the overflowed stream. Seven people on the bus perished.

== See also ==
- 2011 Seoul floods
- 2014 Hiroshima landslides
