= North Natuna Sea =

Indonesian disputed territorial waters

- Laut Natuna Utara (Indonesian); Laot Natune Utare (Malay); لاوت ناتونا اوتارا (Jawi)
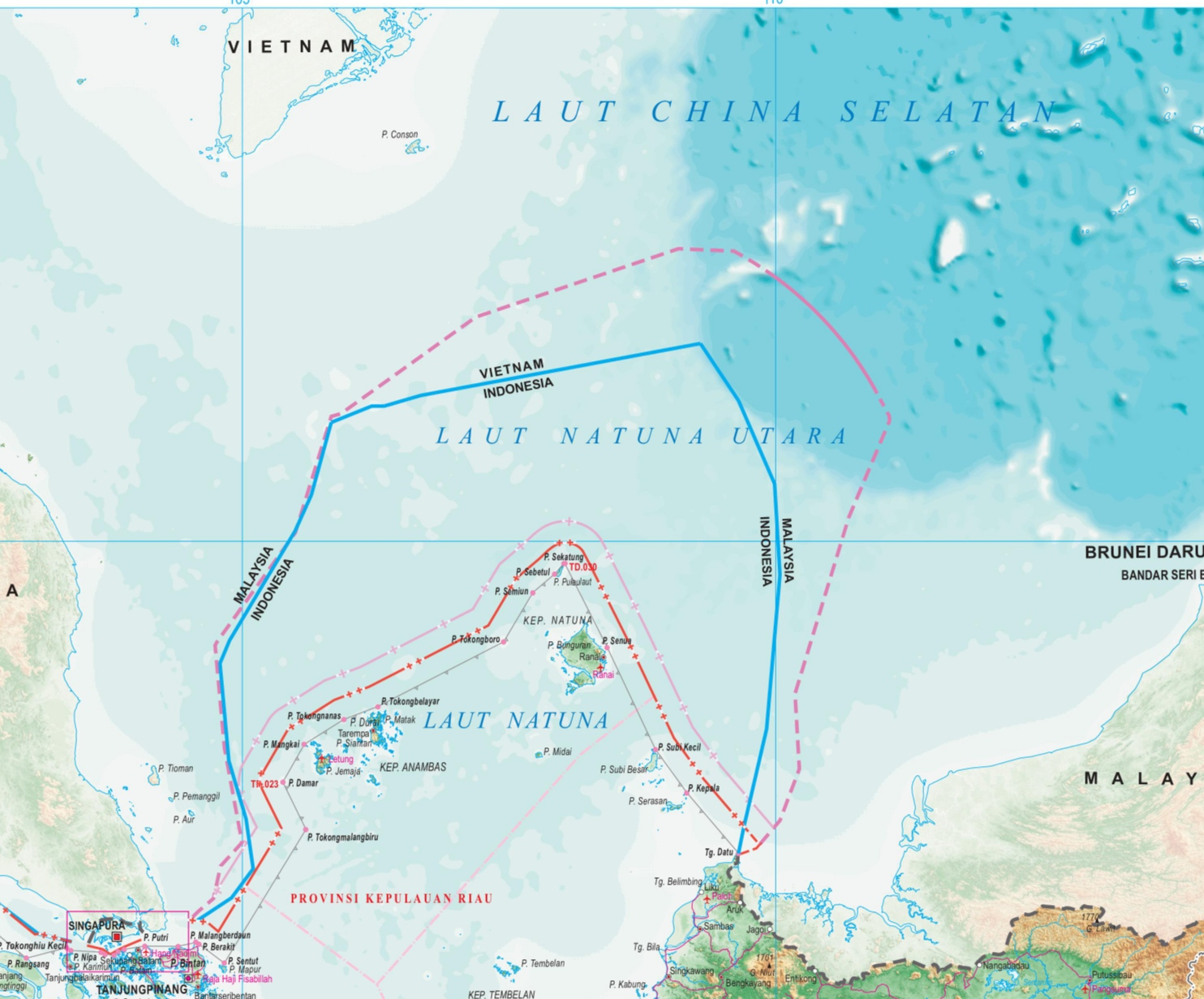
- North Natuna Sea of Riau Islands province.

- Location within Indonesia
- Coordinates: 5.553°N 108.226°E
- Type: Sea
- Basin countries: Indonesia
- Islands: Natuna

The North Natuna Sea (Indonesian: Laut Natuna Utara; dialectal Malay: Laot Natune Utare; Jawi script: لاوت ناتونا اوتارا) is a shallow body of water located north of Natuna Regency. Named by the Indonesian government in July 2017, Indonesia changed the designation of the northern part of its Exclusive Economic Zone in the South China Sea to the North Natuna Sea, which borders the southern part of Vietnam's Exclusive Economic Zone. The North Natuna Sea lies between the Natuna Islands, the Natuna Sea, and Cape Cà Mau, south of the Mekong Delta in Vietnam.

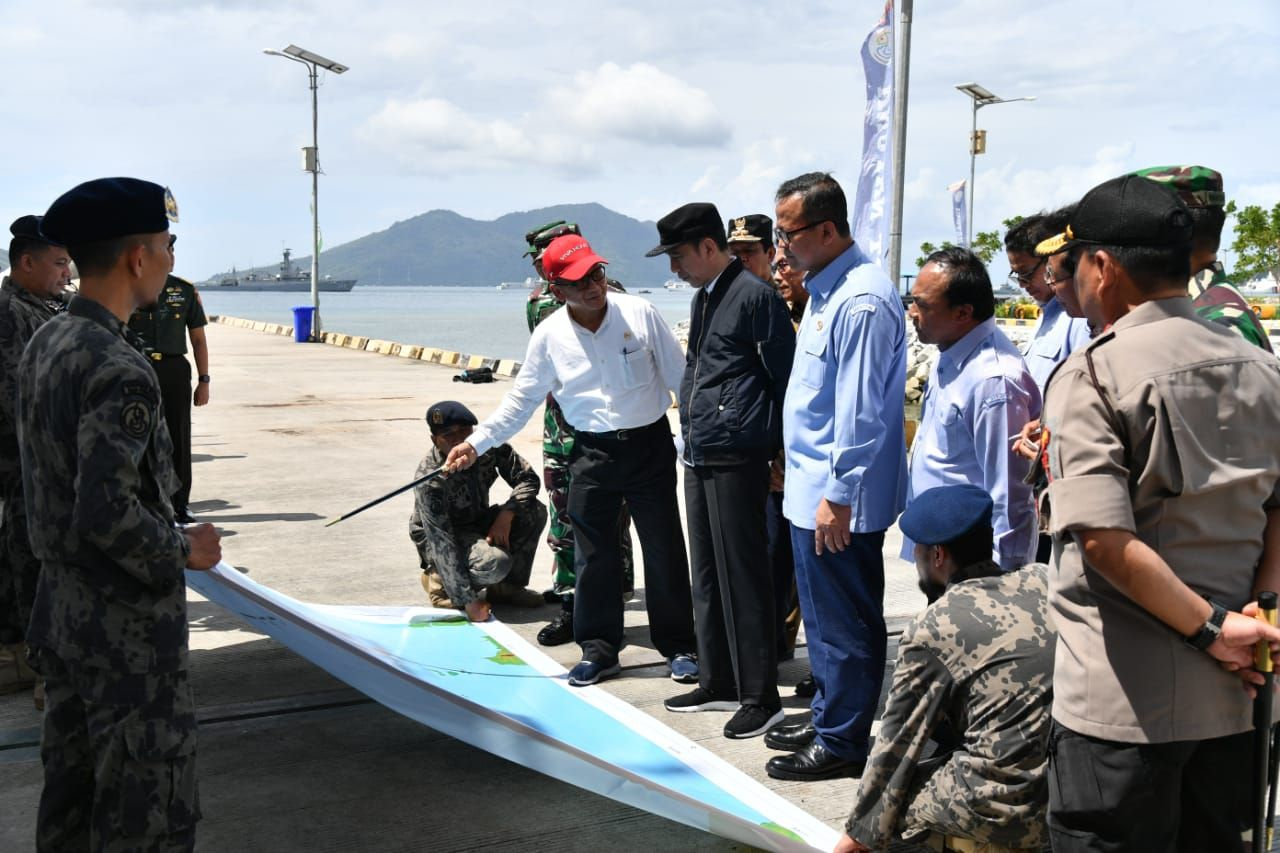
President Jokowi surveying a map of the Natuna and North Natuna Seas

== History ==
The naming of the North Natuna Sea was historically done by the Malay people who have inhabited the Natuna Regency area for a long time. Since the 19th century, the waters surrounding the Natuna Islands were part of the territory of the Riau-Lingga Sultanate, which was previously controlled by the Kingdom of Pattani and the Johor Sultanate in Malaysia. Later, claims were made by Malaysia based on this historical connection, but these claims were discontinued following the Indonesia-Malaysia Confrontation.

In 1982, the United Nations Convention on the Law of the Sea (UNCLOS) was signed by various countries, establishing territorial boundaries and exclusive economic zones. The convention confirmed the territorial waters of each country, including Indonesia. In the *Limits of Oceans and Seas, 4th edition* (1986) and its revised edition (2000), the International Hydrographic Organization (IHO) recognized the formation of the Natuna Sea. As a result, the southern boundary of the South China Sea was moved from the Bangka Belitung Islands to the northern part of the Natuna Islands. However, this draft has never been ratified by the IHO.

Indonesia's exploration of the North Natuna Sea began in the 1980s, with Exxon Mobil being the first company to enter into an agreement for the management of oil and gas fields in the area. In the 1990s, significant research and exploration took place, and by the end of the 20th century, the company started production. In the early 2000s, many other companies also began managing the area.

With China's increasing claims over the sea area, the Indonesian government initiated a re-mapping of Indonesia's territory. In 2017, the Indonesian government officially adopted the name North Natuna Sea for the waters of the Indonesian EEZ, located north of the Natuna Sea.

== Geography ==
The North Natuna Sea is a narrow body of water located within Indonesia's EEZ, south of the South China Sea, northeast of the Gulf of Thailand, and north of the Natuna Sea. This sea intersects with the EEZ boundaries of two ASEAN countries, Vietnam and Malaysia.This sea is a strategic area as it serves as a major international shipping route for vessels traveling from East Asia to central and southern Southeast Asia, as well as those passing through the Strait of Malacca. This sea is close to the reef is Prince of Wales Bank (Spratly Islands but claimed by Vietnam, China, and Taiwan). It is considered a high-traffic maritime zone. In addition to being a dense sea traffic area, it is also a central point for the Southeast Asian region.

== Natural resources ==
The North Natuna Sea lies at the junction of the deeper waters of the South China Sea and the shallower waters of the Natuna Sea and the Gulf of Thailand. Due to its geographical location and geological activity, the North Natuna Sea region has abundant natural resources.

=== Biology ===
The geological formation of the North Natuna Sea and South China Sea basins over hundreds of millions of years has created oil and gas reserves beneath the seafloor. The North Natuna Sea has a relatively shallow depth, which connects to the deep basin bathymetry of the South China Sea. The basin's shape creates a distinctive ocean current circulation pattern known as the Vietnam Jet Current (VJC) and the Natuna Off-Shelf Current (NOC). The Vietnam Jet Current is a high-speed current flowing from the Pacific Ocean into the western South China Sea, moving along the continental shelf off Vietnam. Upon reaching the Natuna Sea cliffs to the north, it reverses direction and is then referred to as the Natuna Off-Shelf Current (NOC).

The Mekong River, which flows off the coast of Vietnam, supplies nutrients from the land into the South China Sea. These nutrients are then uplifted by the Vietnam Jet Current and the Natuna Off-Shelf Current. Chlorophyll and oxygen are evenly distributed throughout the coastal waters of the South China Sea and North Natuna Sea due to these ocean currents, making the area rich in marine life. The North Natuna Sea is part of the Republic of Indonesia Fisheries Management Area (WPP NRI) 711.

=== Oil and gas ===
It is estimated that Natuna's oil and gas reserves amount to approximately 127 million barrels, consisting of 14,386,470 barrels of oil and 112,356,680 barrels of gas. The area has significant hydrocarbon gas potential, making it one of the largest sources in Asia, with an estimated recoverable amount of 46 TCT. The North Natuna Sea area contains a total of sixteen oil and gas field blocks. However, as of 2021, eleven of these blocks have been actively managed. These include:

1. Block A Natuna Sea
2. Block B South Natuna Sea
3. Block Cumi-Cumi
4. Block Kakap
5. Block Northwest Natuna
6. Block East Natuna
7. Block Northeast Natuna
8. Block Nila
9. Block South Sokang
10. Block Tobong
11. Block Tuna

== Conflict ==
Map of the Spratly Islands (2015). On the left, China's nine-dash-line intersects with Indonesia's EEZ in the North Natuna Sea.

Both the Chinese and Indonesian governments often assert that there is no territorial dispute between them, a stance taken to foster and maintain positive bilateral relations between the two nations. In 2014, Chinese Foreign Ministry Spokesperson Geng Shuang stated, "There is no territorial dispute between Indonesia and China." In 2015, Indonesian Minister of Foreign Affairs Retno Marsudi similarly asserted that "Indonesia does not have overlapping claims with any other countries" and that "no country has ever claimed the Natuna Islands." Despite these statements, China's nine-dash line overlaps with Indonesia's EEZ in the North Natuna Sea. China's claim to Indonesian waters covers approximately 83,000 km², or 30 percent of Indonesia's sea area in Natuna.

This dispute began to surface in 2010. Since then, there have been frequent conflicts between the Chinese and Indonesian governments due to the entry of Chinese-flagged vessels—including fishing boats, research vessels, Chinese coast guard ships, and Chinese warships—into the North Natuna Sea, an area that China claims based on historical fishing activities during earlier empires. Chinese research vessels have frequently traveled through the North Natuna Sea, but none of their research findings have been shared with the Indonesian government. Fishing conflicts in the North Natuna Sea are not limited to Chinese-flagged fishing boats. Illegal fishing is also often carried out by Vietnamese- and Malaysian-flagged vessels.
