= 2011 Seoul floods =

2011 Korean floods
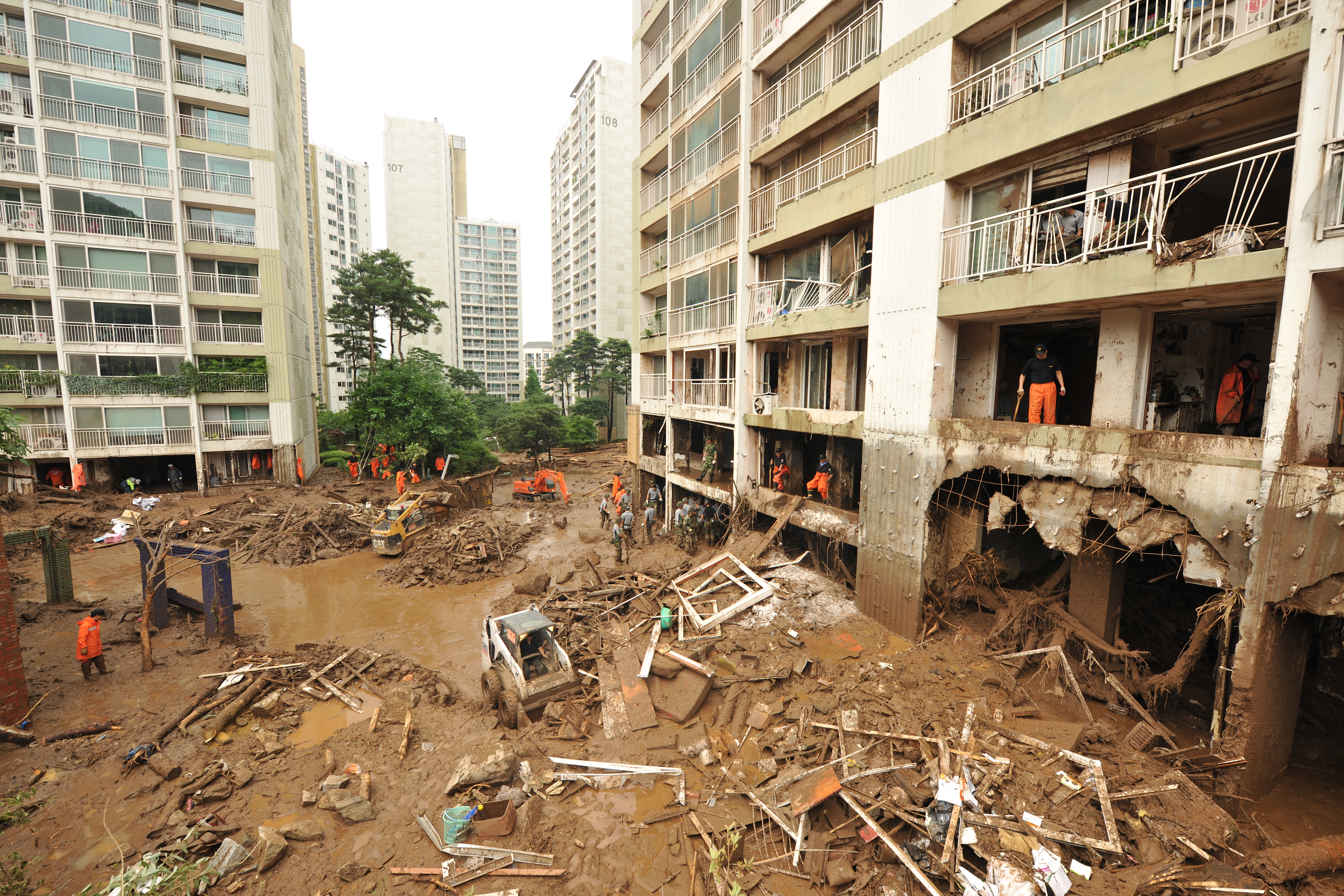
- After the rain, this apartment was in ruins.
- Date: July 25 – 28, 2011 (KST)
- Location: Republic of Korea Democratic People's Republic of Korea
- Deaths: At least 69 (8 missing)
- Property damage: Several hundred million USD

The 2011 Seoul floods were a series of floods in late July 2011 caused by heavy rainfall around Seoul, South Korea. The intense rain triggered a series of flash floods and landslides that killed at least 49 people by July 27, leaving a total of more than 77 dead or missing. On July 27, the number of killed rose further to 69. The floods occurred primarily around the national capital Seoul and nearby Siheung regions. At least 86 power outages followed the landslides, affecting 125,000 people by July 27. Over 11,000 South Koreans were forced to evacuate.

== Causes and meteorology ==
On July 25, rains and thunderstorms triggered by a trough hit the mountains of the Korean Peninsula, producing over 495 mm (19.5 in) of rain in the Seoul region during a two-day span, the heaviest such event in July since 1907. 587 mm (23.1 in) of rain was recorded in the area after three days.

== Impact ==
On July 26, a landslide buried three hotels in Chuncheon, east of Seoul, killing 13 people from Inha University. A landslide in Umyeon-dong killed 18 residents in an apartment block. Floodwaters inundated highways and tracks of the Seoul Metropolitan Subway, while bridges over the Han River were closed off. Damages are likely to be in the hundreds of millions USD. Motor vehicle damages reached $38 million on July 28. Close to 978 ha (2,420 acres) of agricultural land and more than 10,000 homes were flooded.

=== Economic damage ===
Rail infrastructure in South Korea was impacted, while a South Korean investment analyst expected economic inflation to reach 4.6%.

== Political issues ==
An editorial from Kyunghyang Shinmun pointed to Mayor of Seoul Oh Se-hoon as the main culprit of the worsened flood crisis; as both his Hangang Renaissance project and his Design Seoul project (which redesigned some streets in Seoul) had further increased the overall damage of the flooding.

There is a concern whether the Umyeon-san landslide resulted from a natural cause or intentional negligence of prevention by the government.

== Landmine threat ==
Approximately ten landmines from the Korean War in the vicinity of Umyeon were buried by a landslide on July 26, and have not been recovered as of July 28.

== North Korean floods ==
In neighbouring North Korea, nearly 100 km^{2} (39 sq mi) of land was flooded, with the worst impact in South Hwanghae. Fatalities and damages are unknown.

== See also ==
- 2011 China floods
- 2011 Pacific typhoon season
- 2012 North Korean floods
