= 2008 floods =

2008 floods may refer to:

- 2008 Benin floods
- 2008 Bihar flood
- 2008 Indian floods
- Iowa flood of 2008
- 2008 Irish flash floods
- Early Spring 2008 Midwest floods
- June 2008 Midwest floods
- 2008 Namibia floods
- 2008 Papua New Guinea floods
- 2008 Santa Catarina floods
- 2008 South China floods
- 2008 Tanana Valley flood
- 2008 Vietnam floods
- 2008 Yemen cyclone

== See also ==
- List of notable floods
- Floods in the United States: 2001-present
