= 2009 Angola, Namibia and Zambia floods =

Natural disaster in Africa

Coordinates: 17.4°S 16.0°E

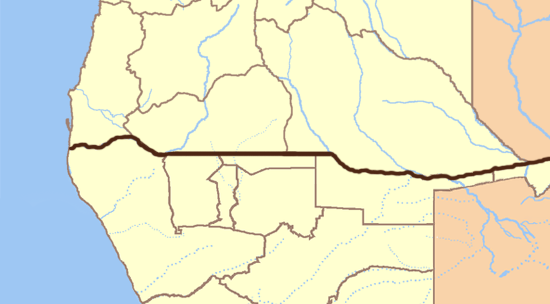
- Border between Angola and Namibia

Meteorological history
- Duration: March–April 2009

Overall effects
- Fatalities: At least 131 deaths
- Damage: At least $5 million
- Areas affected: Southern Angola, Northern Namibia, Western Zambia

The 2009 Angola, Namibia and Zambia floods was a natural disaster which began in early March 2009 and resulted in the deaths of at least 131 people and otherwise affected around 445,000 people. The floods affected seven regions of Namibia, three provinces of Zambia, two regions of Angola and part of Botswana. The floodwaters damaged buildings and infrastructure and displaced at least 300,000 people. A state of emergency was declared in northern Namibia and there were fears that a disease epidemic would ensue. The Red Cross agencies and governments of the two countries responded to the disaster, and aid was distributed be the World Health Organization.

== Causes ==
The border regions of Angola, Namibia and Zambia are dominated by small rivers which flood regularly during the rainy season from December to April. Floods in 2008 lasted from February to March and affected 250,000 people in Namibia with 42 people losing their lives. The floods this year have primarily been caused by heavy rain; more rain has fallen on the region since December than fell in the entire five-month rainy season of last year. As a result, the flooding this year has been worse than that usually experienced. It has been reported that the floods could be the worst in the area for four decades. The Angolan National Institute of Meteorology has placed the cause of the heavy rain with a large equatorial depression which is expected to remain over the country until April when it will start to move southwards. One report has blamed the continuing heavy rain on the effects of the meteorological phenomenon La Niña.

== Effects ==
=== Angola ===
Angola has been affected by floods within two of its provinces: Cuando Cubango and Cunene. The worst affected province has been Cunene, which lies on the Cuvelai River. Within Cunene alone 125,000 people have been affected by the flood and 25,000 have lost their homes. Across the country more than 30,000 people have been made homeless by the floods. There are fears that the floods could exacerbate diseases already present in the area, particularly cholera and malaria. Three cases of cholera have also been reported in Ondjiva, the capital of Cunene region, and local officials expect that number to increase. The Red Cross reports that so far there have been 19 deaths attributable to flooding in Angola.

=== Botswana ===
Botswana has been affected by the rising height of the Okavango River has risen to 8.62 m, the second highest depth recorded and the highest since 1969. The Okavango terminates in Botswana at the inland Okavango Delta and the Botswana government has issued an alert to those living alongside the river to move to higher ground. The government has evacuated 63 families amid concerns that flooding will worsen, particularly in the Chobe District. More than 400 people have been displaced as a result of the floods and the Botswana Defence Force is working to help those affected.

=== Namibia ===
Seven regions of Namibia have been affected by the flood: Omusati, Ohangwena, Oshana, Oshikoto, Zambezi, Kavango and Kunene. The worst affected regions have been Omusati, Ohangwena, Oshana and Oshikoto which lie on the Cuvelai River. In the Zambezi Region floodwaters have reached areas up to 20 km from where the river normally flows. Up to 300,000 people have been affected by the floods in Namibia which have displaced around 276,000 people. The floods have destroyed crops, houses, schools, medical centres and roads in the country whose president, Hifikepunye Pohamba, has said could be experiencing one of the worst natural disasters in living memory. Gravel roads have been particularly affected with up to 85% of those in affected areas being damaged and cutting people off from assistance. People and livestock have been washed away and there have been cases of crocodiles and hippopotamuses swimming in the flood water, attacking and killing people. There was a pre-existing cholera outbreak in the Kunene Region and the floods have worsened this by overwhelming sanitation infrastructure and reducing supplies of clean drinking water. Malaria cases have also increased, with 2,000 known to have contracted the disease of which 25 have died. The Namibian government has stated that 112 people have died so far as a result of flooding.

President Pohamba has stated that a food shortage could follow the floods and the United Nations has estimated that crop production in Namibia will fall by 63% in the next year and that up to 500,000 people could be affected by a food shortage. Local food prices have already risen by 37% because of the disaster.

=== Zambia ===
Zambia has experienced flooding in the Western, North-Western and Southern Provinces. The damage to infrastructure alone totals more than $5 million and one district, Shangombo, remains cut off from outside help completely. The floods have affected 20,000 households and destroyed 5,000 homes in the Southern Province alone.

=== Elsewhere ===
Although this particular flood event has been worse than previously experienced in Namibia and Angola, there have been lower levels of flooding elsewhere in the region, such as on the Zambezi River, and the rainy season is expected to last just four more weeks. It is expected that the Kariba Dam in Zimbabwe and the Cahora Bassa Dam in Mozambique will protect countries on the lower Zambezi from flooding caused by rainwater in the upper river. The Red Cross is also keeping watch on Severe Tropical Storm Izilda which is heading for Mozambique's east coast and could cause further flooding there.

== Reactions ==
President Pohamba has declared a state of emergency across six northern districts, and has requested international assistance. The Namibian state relief fund has been active in the region delivering water, food, tents and other supplies to flooded areas by helicopter and motorboat. However it is hindered by a shortage of both aircraft and boats, and is running out of funding. The Red Cross agencies in both Angola and Namibia have responded to the disaster. The Angola Red Cross is distributing mosquito nets, water purification tablets and rehydration sachets and the Namibia Red Cross Society has been distributing chlorine tablets and promoting hygiene in the affected areas. The World Health Organization has also responded with the delivery of five tonnes of health care kits and supplies of drinking water. There were fears that the 2008 financial crisis may limit the effectiveness of aid agencies who are already over-stretched across Africa. Displaced persons camps have been established in Oshana, Oshikoto, Ohangwena and Omusati in Namibia and currently hold around 4,500 people although they are said to be overcrowded and lacking in fresh water and sanitation provision. The World Health Organization has sent several healthcare teams into the area to train emergency personnel and to provide expertise in disease prevention. The floods coincided with a visit to Angola by Pope Benedict XVI, who expressed solidarity with the flood victims and encouraged reconstruction efforts. The Namibian national power company, NamPower, has donated food worth N$50,000 to those who have lost their homes in the areas near to Ruacana Hydro-electric Power Station which accounts for 70% of the country's electricity needs. The International Federation of Red Cross and Red Crescent Societies has launched an appeal for $1.3 million to fund relief operations to assist 20,000 people in Namibia.

== See also ==
- 2008–2009 Zimbabwean cholera outbreak
- 2008 Namibia floods
