= Lakeshore Area Regional Recovery of Indiana =

Non-profit organization

Lakeshore Area Regional Recovery of Indiana, or LARRI, is a non-profit, faith-based, long-term recovery committee. LARRI provided assistance to the survivors of the flooding of September 13–15, 2008.

== Structure of the organization ==
On November 18, 2009, members from a then newly-formed steering committee made up of non-profit, faith-based, business, public and other community partners came together to form a long-term recovery committee. This organization was formed to help serve the survivors from the September 13–15, 2008 flooding who had exhausted their resources from insurance, FEMA, savings and other sources in the restoration of their homes.

The organization named itself Lakeshore Area Regional Recovery of Indiana, or LARRI. Reverend Steven Conger, senior pastor of Ridge United Methodist Church in Munster, worked to bring representatives of different faiths together from Lake, Porter and LaPorte counties to develop a long-term strategy to address those residents' needs.

The group was formed, according to Conger, because of the challenges many people faced after the September 2008 flood. According to Conger, many residents in Lake, Porter and LaPorte counties were unprepared for the disaster, and LARRI was formed not only to help those whose lives were devastated by the flooding, but also to help prevent the chaos from occurring again.

LARRI had set up several subcommittees to work on topics such as communication and financial resource development. It secured funds through donations and planned fundraisers and searched for grants and funding.

In June 2009, LARRI named Jane Delligatti as its director. Delligatti had more than 20 years of experience in planning and program implementation, including as director of marketing for Arnell Auto Group in Burns Harbor, Indiana; owner of Millennium Marketing and Advertising in Chesterton, Indiana, and prepress manager at the Post-Tribune in Merrillville, Indiana.

== Grants ==
LARRI is funded through a grant from Lilly Endowment to assist people from the Northwest Indiana region who were effected by the September 2008 flood.

== Partners and supporters ==
At the beginning of LARRI's formation, the Indiana Association of United Way was instrumental in helping the organization obtain a grant from Lilly Endowment

The American Red Cross and Salvation Army have lent their support to LARRI since its inception, and continue to help LARRI by sitting on its steering committee.

AmeriCorps NCCC has worked with LARRI almost since its creation, and has been involved in many home rebuilds since 2006. As of 2010, LARRI had welcomed five AmeriCorps NCCC teams to the Northwest Indiana region.

Northwest Indiana Home Depot stores and The RoomPlace provided in-kind support of volunteer manpower and furniture to support flood victims.

The Christian Reformed World Relief Committee (CRWRC) and Church of the Brethren Disaster Ministries provided support to LARRI by volunteering to restore homes for families who had been affected by the September 2008 floods.
