= 2008 Namibia floods =

Meteorological history
- Duration: February–March 2008

Overall effects
- Fatalities: At least 42 deaths
- Areas affected: Northern Namibia, especially Oshana, Ohangwena, Omusati and Oshikoto

The 2008 Namibia floods took place in early February 2008, a rapid onset of heavy rains triggered floods in northern Namibia, leading to one of its worst floods in 50 years. The floods had killed 42 people by early March and an estimated 65,000 people were affected, primarily in the regions of Omusati, Oshikoto, Oshana, Ohangwena and Caprivi. 40,000 people were assisted by the Namibian Red Cross with 4,600 in relocation camps. Over-crowding and insanitary conditions caused health concerns in relocation camps and an outbreak of cholera was announced in March. On 14 March, the United Nations Office for Outer Space Affairs triggered the International Charter for "Space and Major Disasters". Staple crops were devastated and 52,000 people from flood-affected areas were considered in need of immediate of assistance to cover their basic food needs. Deputy Prime Minister Libertine Amathila declared that the government would spend 65 million Namibian dollars to assist the displaced. Long-term impacts included damage to farmland, housing, schools, roads and infrastructure across the region. The floods reduced the resilience of the population who were left vulnerable to further flooding which occurred in 2009.

== Background ==
The floods hit the northern Namibian regions of Omusati, Oshikoto, Oshana, Ohangwena, and Caprivi. These regions are the most densely populated in the nation with an estimated 859,975 people, almost half of the total population. Northern Namibia has a semi-arid climate with high temperatures. The rain patterns are unpredictable, with varying amounts and timing, although the rainy season tends to fall from November to April. The majority of the people living in the rural areas of northern Namibia rely on subsistence farming, but the poor soil, largely composed of clay and sand mixture, is not ideal for crop production. This results in high levels of chronic food insecurity in these regions. These threats are exacerbated by poor health outcomes, as large swaths of the population do not have access to adequate medical services. HIV/AIDS is especially prevalent in the area, with an estimated 23% of Namibians aged 15 to 49 testing HIV-positive.

== Impact ==
=== Health and well-being ===
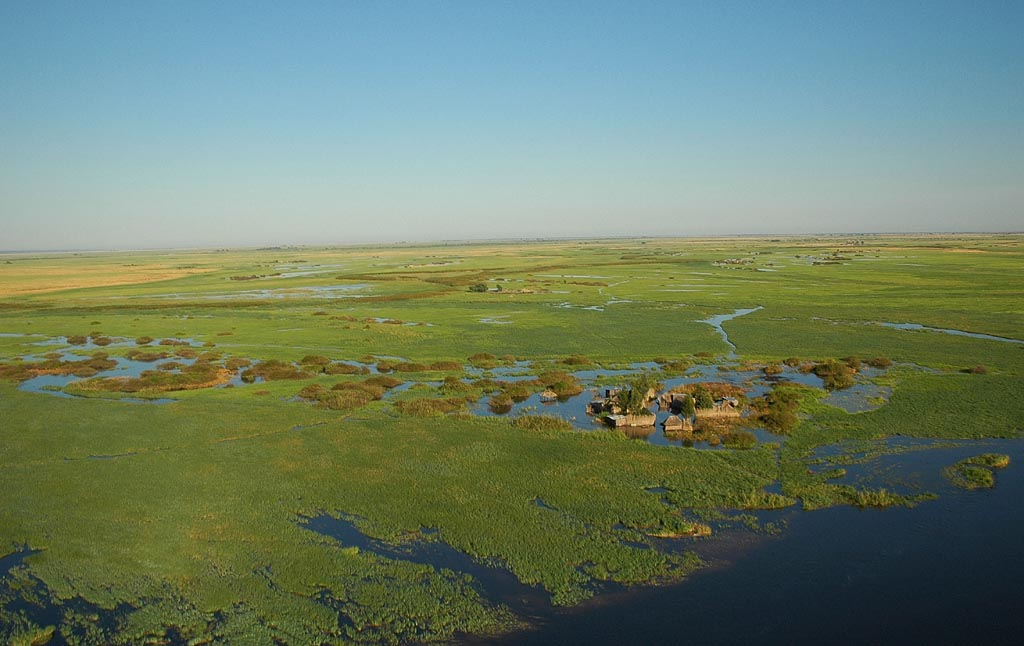
Village in the eastern Caprivi floodplains.

An estimated 65,000 people were affected by the floods. 71 casualties were reported by March 2008 of which there were 42 deaths. Deaths were predominantly children and the elderly who drowned crossing oshonas (flood plains) at night. Wounds resulting from walking in water were a problem in Caprivi. Outreach clinics in rural areas were cut off by the flooding.

Relocation camps were set up in the Engela District and Oshana Region and housed over 4,600 of the displaced. Camps had limited or no access to latrines, waste disposal and clean tap water, and some camps were overcrowded. An outbreak of cholera at Engela in the Ohangwena Region was announced in March. An assessment undertaken 19–20 March by the World Health Organization (WHO) identified that the case fatality rate (CFR) for cholera may be under recorded and reported common acute diseases in the under fives to include malaria, diarrhea and respiratory infections. Cholera cases were also reported at Odibo and Okatope.

By the 16th of April, 958 cases of cholera, including four deaths, had been reported. Engela Hospital, which was inaccessible by road, opened a cholera treatment centre. WHO figures for cholera in Namibia for 2008 were 3,496 with 38 deaths (1.09% CFR) compared to 14 cases in 2007 with 0 deaths (0% CFR).

=== Food security ===
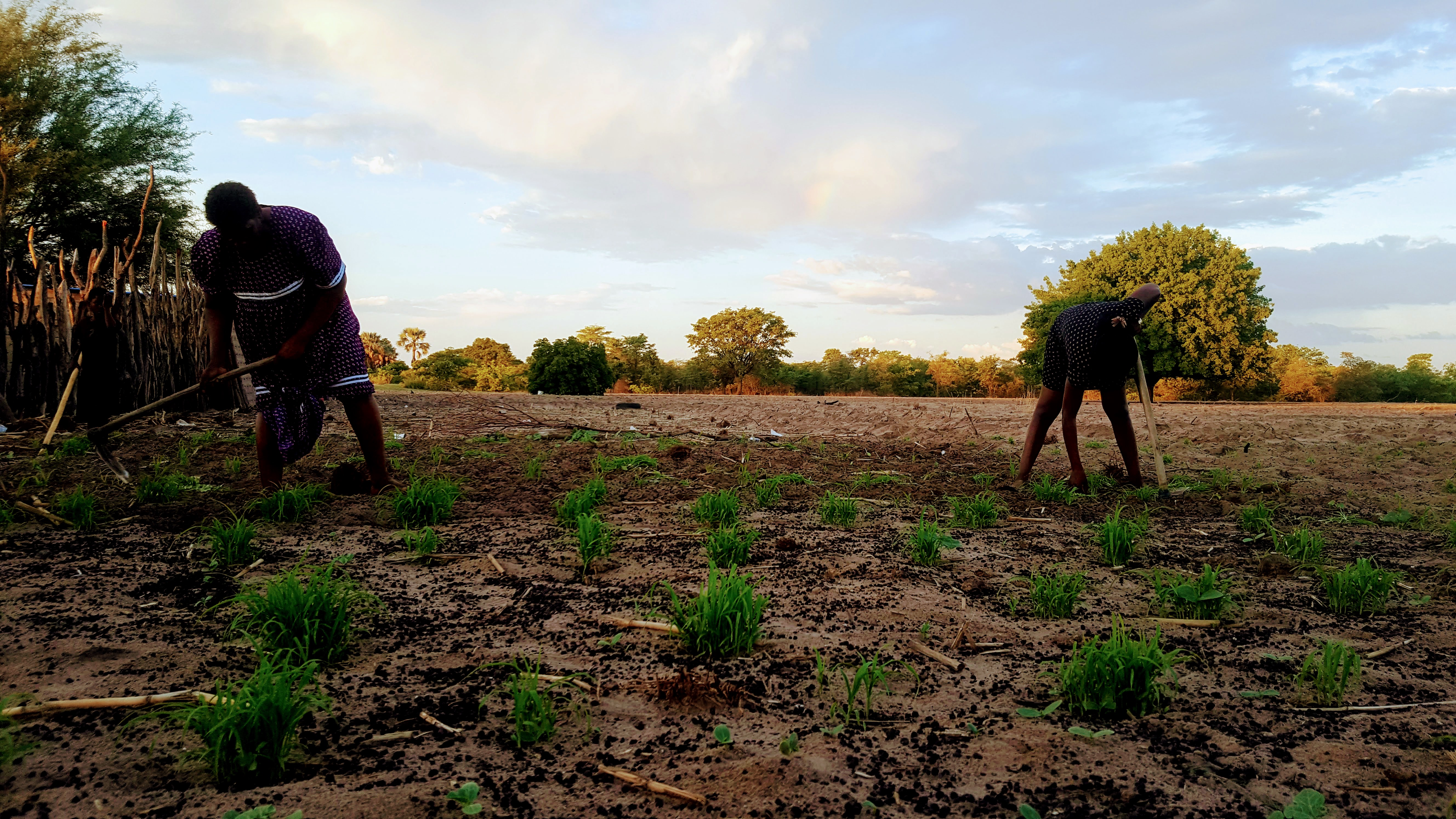
Cultivating mahangu

The floods significantly reduced yields of mahangu, the staple cereal food for the majority of the population in the Northern Central regions. The household stocks of mahangu were not expected to last beyond next the harvest, forcing the household to use savings to purchase food. As low-income households could not easily compensate by lowering already minimal non-food expenditure, they were likely to shift food consumption towards lower calorie and less nutritious foods or simply reduce their food intake.

The European Food Safety Authority mission estimated that compared to the previous agricultural season, there was an average 59% drop in production in the North Central Regions and 46% in affected areas of Caprivi. As a result, 16.4% of the flood affected households in the Northern Central regions were food insecure rising to 32.5% in Caprivi, an area with a high prevalence of HIV/AIDS. These households were unable to meet their daily nutritional requirements. The population affected by the floods went from chronically food insecure to acutely food insecure. An estimated 52,000 people were in immediate need of assistance to cover their basic food needs in flood-affected areas.

== Response ==
The Namibian government declared a state of emergency on 5 March 2008 and appealed to international community for assistance. Working jointly with humanitarian agencies including UN, the government assessed damage extent and established critical needs in the affected areas. The government of Namibia provided food supplies worth N$221,000 and non-food commodities worth N$5.3 million and pledged N$65 million to assist the displaced. The Emergency Management Unit in the Office of the Prime Minister delivered necessary food items to the affected regions using helicopters following roads damage. Flood victims were evacuated to relocation centres in the Engela District and Oshana Region.

The Namibian Red Cross supported over 40,000 people, who were moved back to their homes by end of August 2008. The Red Cross distributed blankets, hygiene kits, water makers, mosquito nets, bar soaps in North-western regions. In partnership with the Swedish Red Cross the Red Cross also provided agricultural items such as millet, sorghum, goats and chicken to improve food security among the most vulnerable in Ohangwena region.

The United Nations Office for Outer Space Affairs triggered the International Charter "Space and Major Disasters" to help the country battle against floods and the subsequent cholera outbreak that ravaged the country. UNICEF trained community health activists, produced radio messages on cholera prevention and distributed water purification tablets in the affected areas.

== Aftermath ==
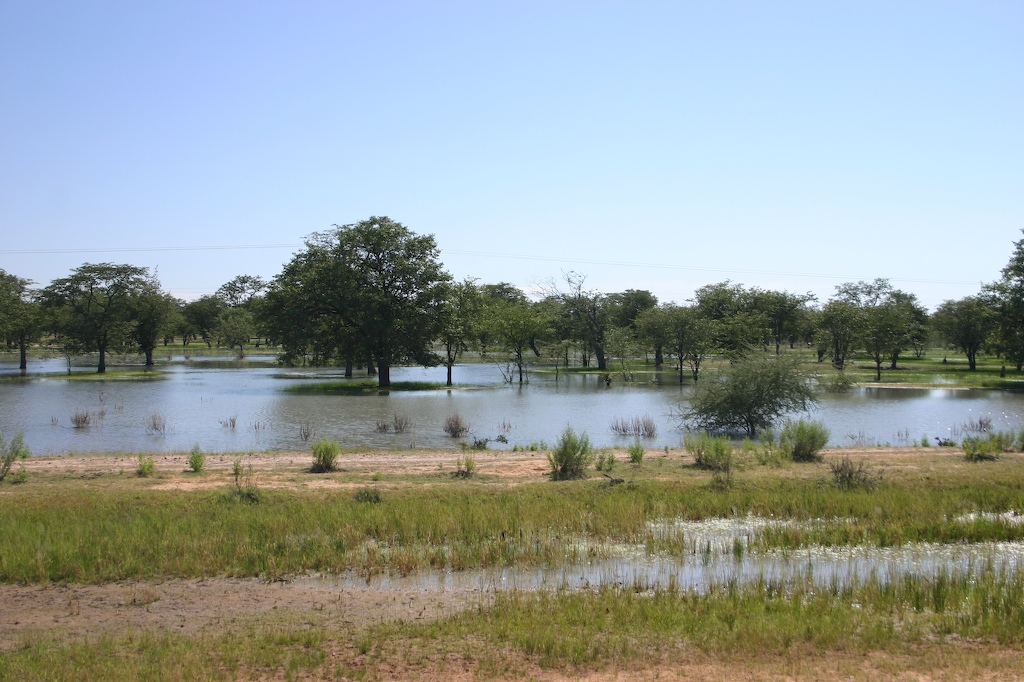
Oshana region in floods

Since 2008, when the first serious Namibia floods disaster occurred, they have become a devastating, almost annual event that finds most households hardly recovered from the previous flood. The communities in the rural areas of North and Central Namibia were most affected by the floods. Their livelihoods are dependent on subsistence farming and the floods increased livestock and household vulnerability of the farmers.

Water logging and retention due to the floods was associated with the loss of land productivity and soil degradation. The declining quality of soil affected the farming of major staple crops, sorghum and mahangu, which escalated food prices in the region furthering household food insecurity.

Livelihoods were affected after livestock died from drowning in large numbers, whilst the poor prevailing conditions made those remaining susceptible to diseases and parasites such as Lumpy skin disease and the African swine fever. Other impacts were on public infrastructure like roads, bridges, sewerage system, health facilities, market places and schools which were damaged extensively. Rehabilitation work in flooded areas went beyond repairs to include the elevation of roads and improvements to the drainage system. The cost of this was 5.5 times the value of replacing damaged structures. Unfortunately, the area and the population had not yet recovered and were still vulnerable when flooding occurred in 2009.
