= Early Spring 2008 Midwest floods =

Weather event

March 2008 Midwest floods
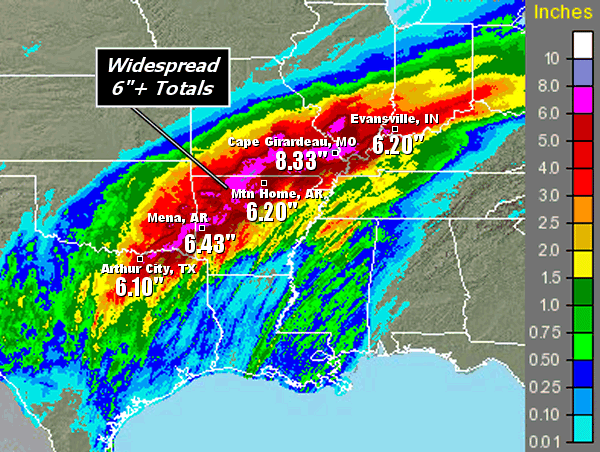
- Total precipitation amounts throughout the region on March 17, 18, and 19

Meteorological history
- Duration: March 17 – early May

Overall effects
- Fatalities: 17
- Damage: Unknown
- Areas affected: Illinois, Indiana, Iowa, Kentucky, Arkansas, Missouri, Texas, Oklahoma, Wisconsin, Ohio and Tennessee

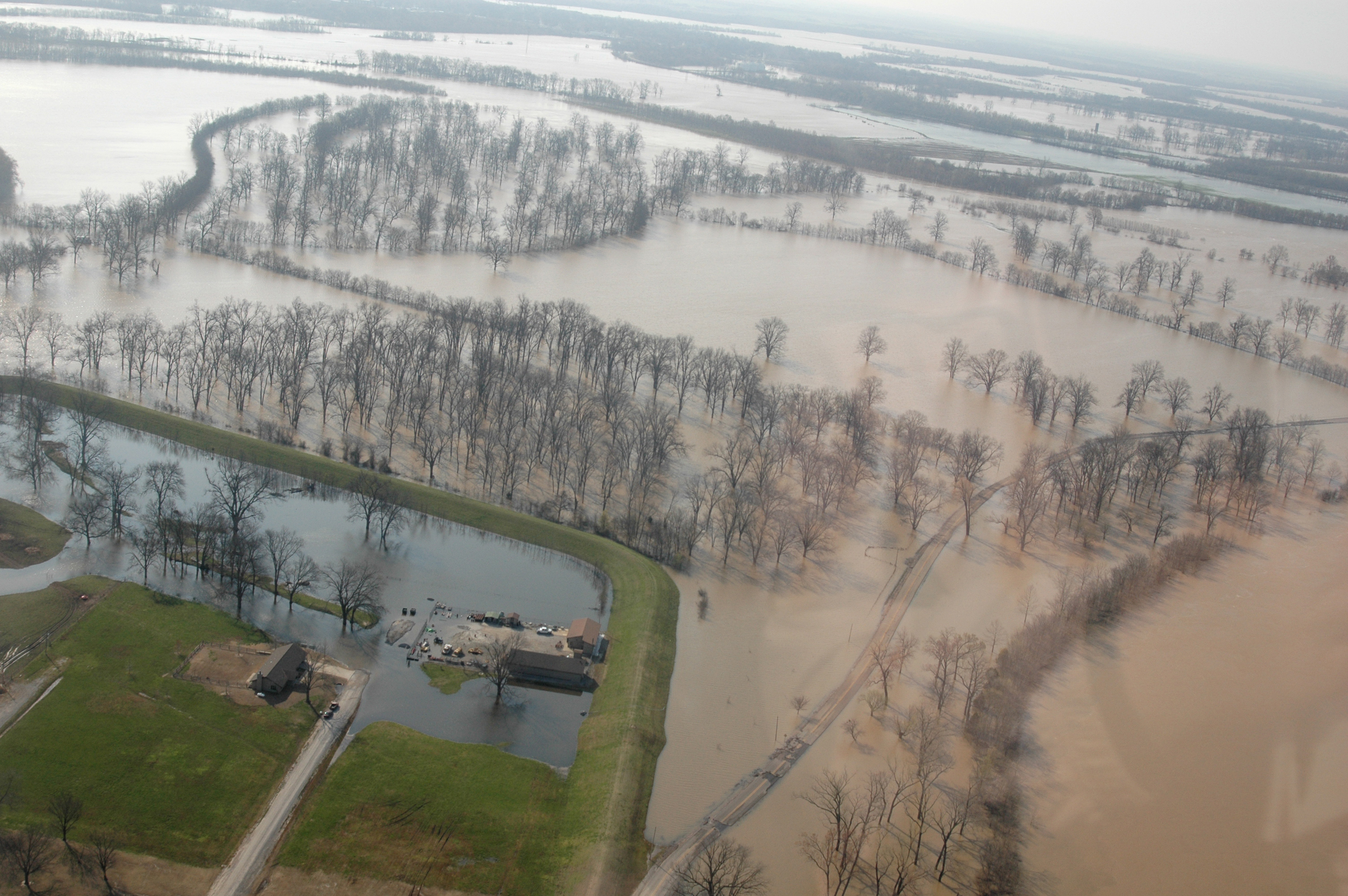
Aerial of flooded Northeastern Arkansas

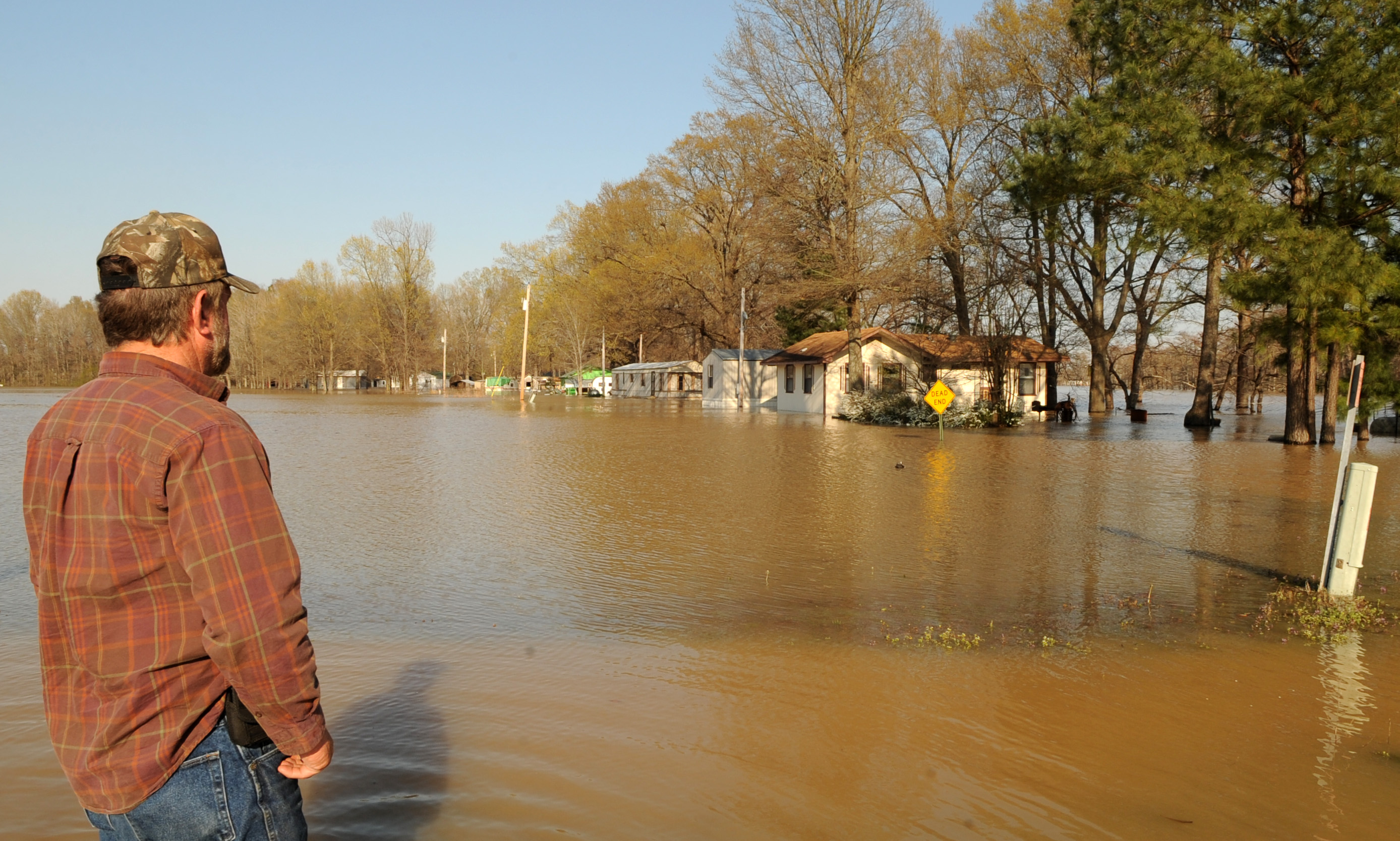
A resident looks at his flooded neighborhood, Arkansas

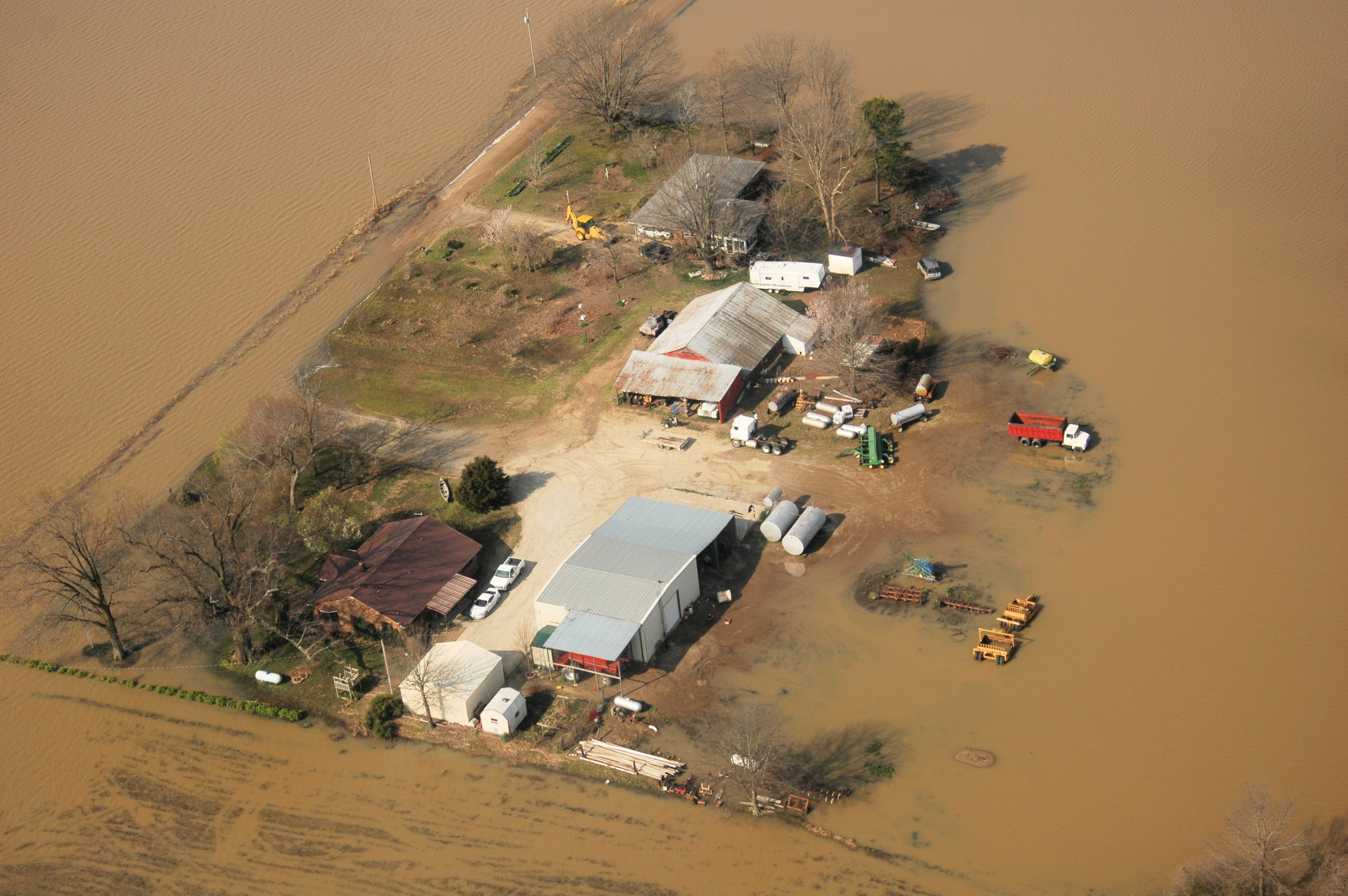
Aerial of a farm isolated by flood waters

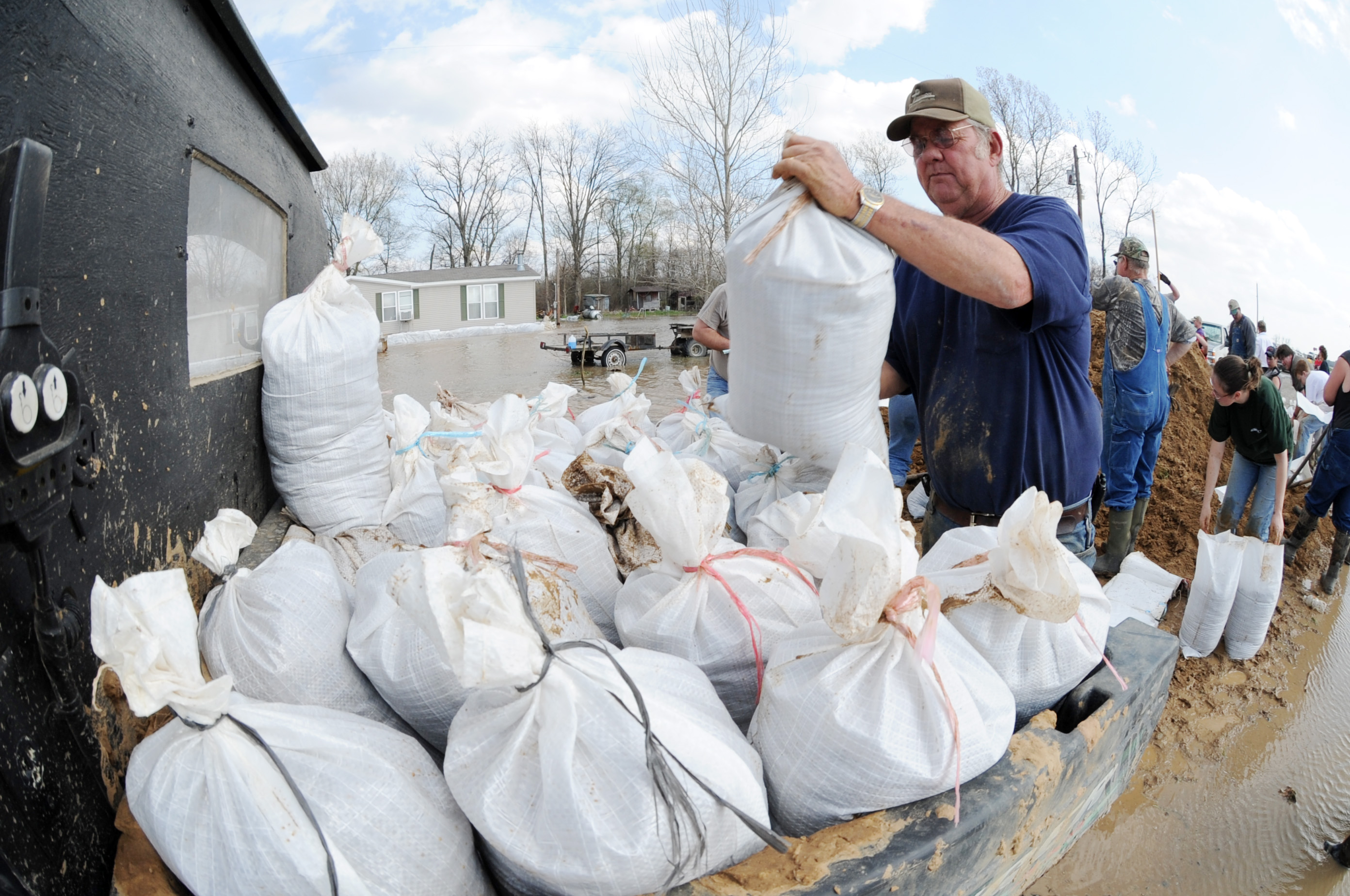
Residents fill sandbags

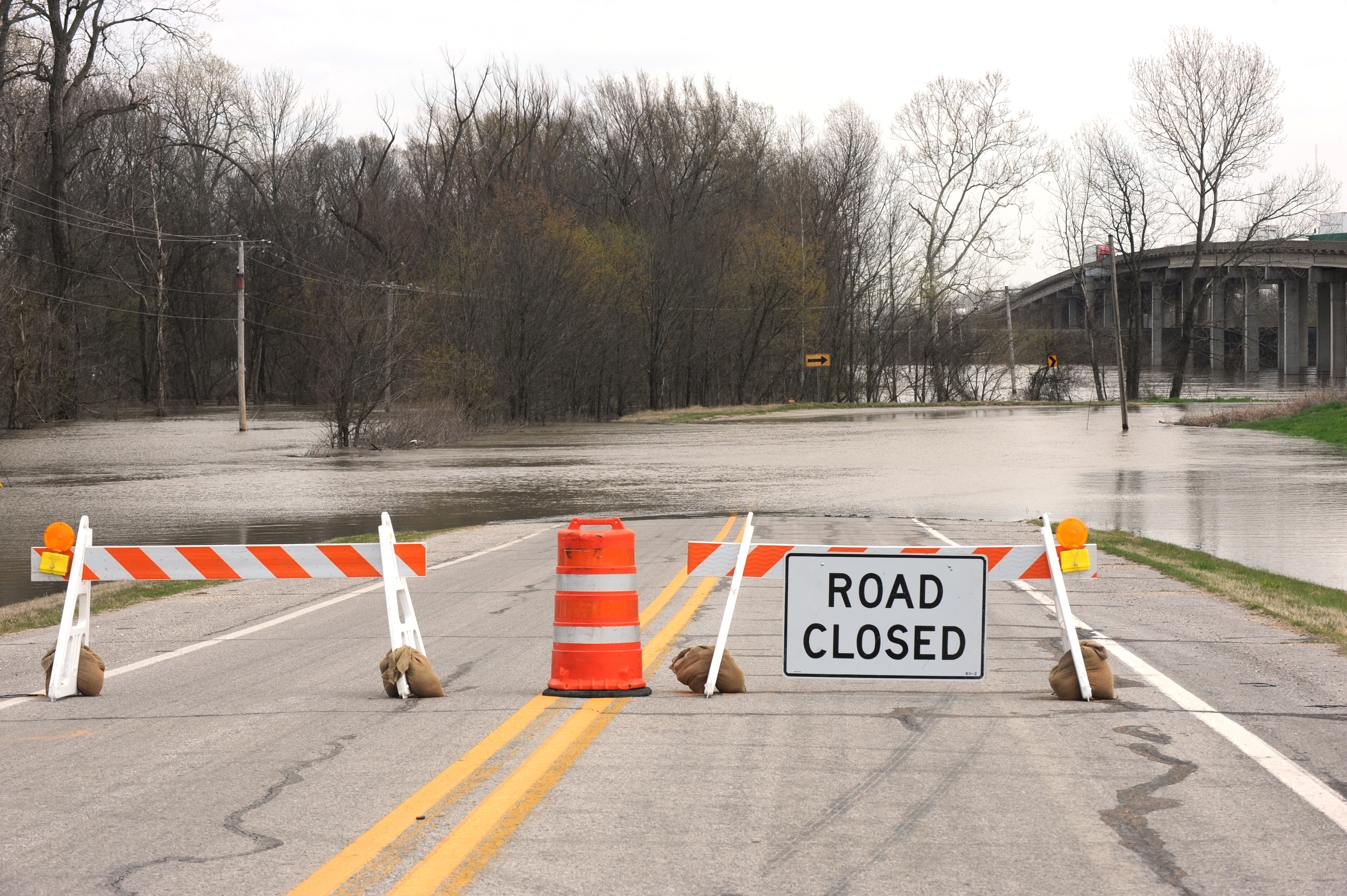
Road closed sign and barricades in West Memphis, AR

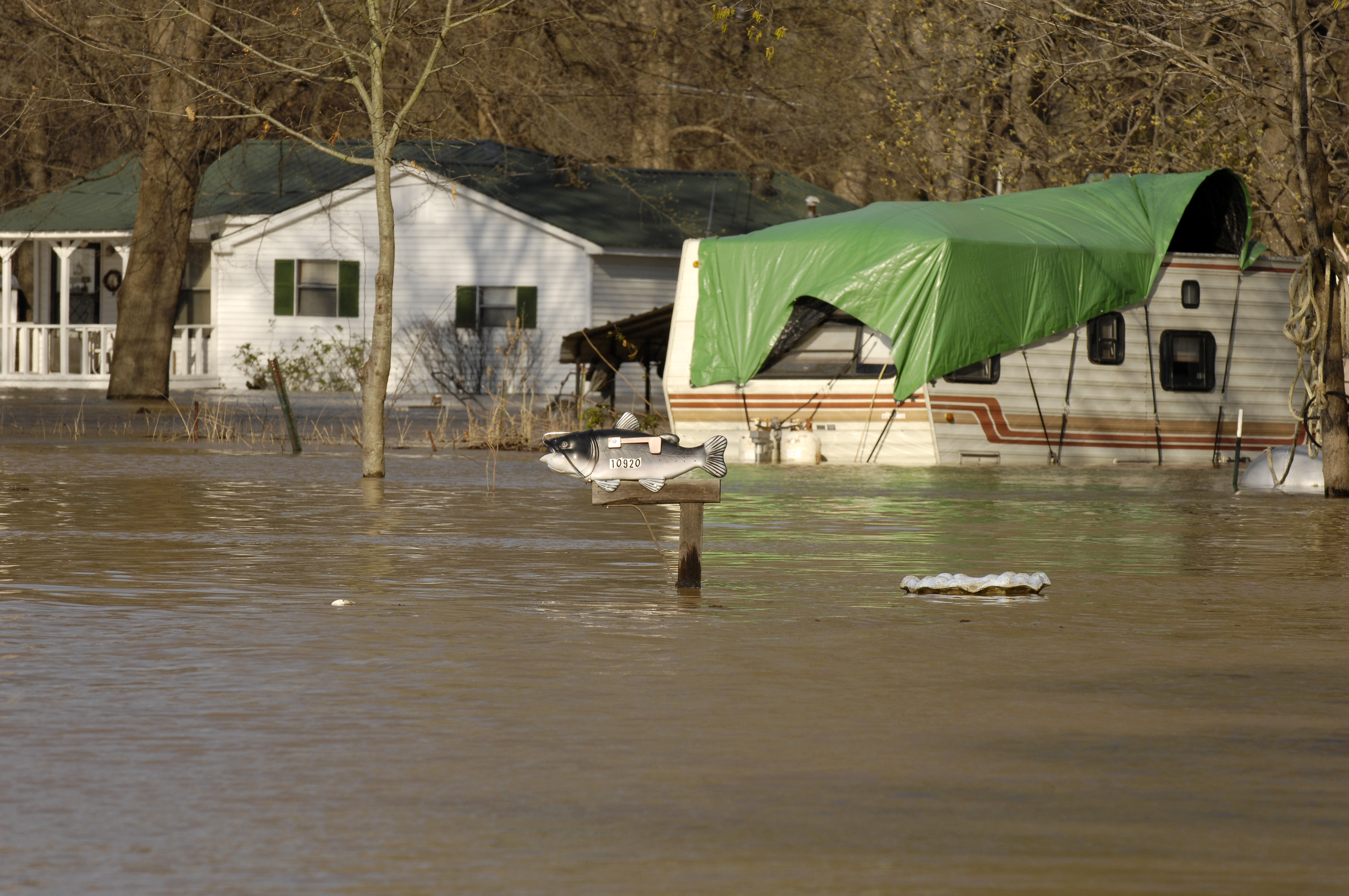
Flooded trailer park in Arkansas

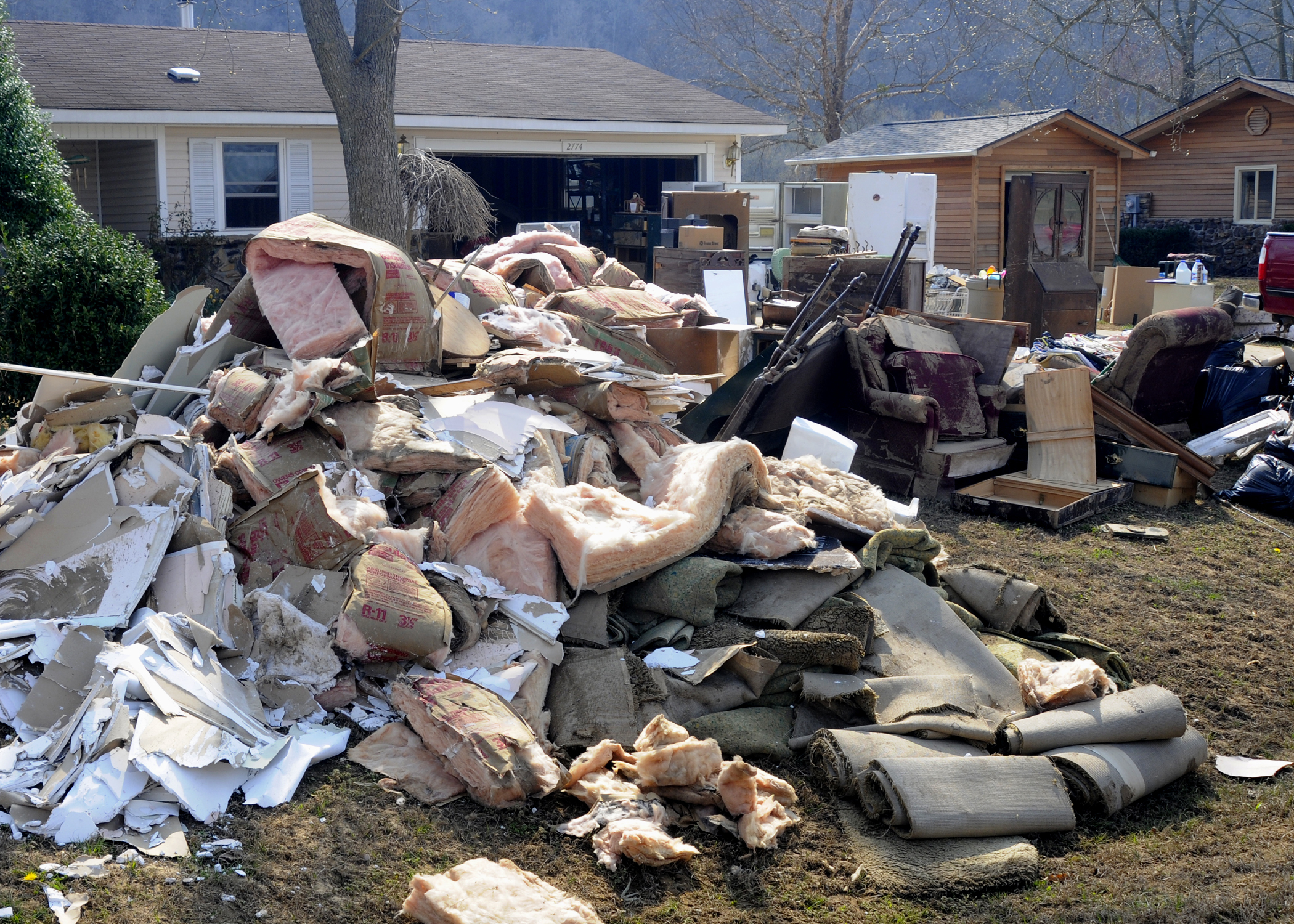
Wet household debris on the front lawns

The March 2008 Midwest floods were a massive flooding event in the Southern Midwest and portions of the Southern Plains. Cape Girardeau, Missouri officially reported 11.48 inches (29.2 cm) between March 18 and 19. At least 17 people died as a result of the flooding. Levee breaks were observed in several areas, most notably in Southeastern Missouri, where levee breaks occurred through mid-April.

== Meteorological synopsis ==
The National Weather Service posted flood watches stretching from Dallas, Texas, to Scranton, Pennsylvania, starting March 16. Two strong low-pressure centers developed along a stationary front that stretched along this line. One was located in the southern region of Illinois, and the other was located near San Antonio, Texas. The northern low, combined with strong upper level winds, dragged large amounts moisture north from the Gulf of Mexico. The southern low produced severe weather and heavy rain on its north side. At one point, the national weather radar composite showed a large shield of heavy rain stretching from Texas to northern Indiana. River flooding continued through May in some areas, causing additional problems where flash flooding from the heavy rains struck. Numerous locations in Arkansas reported record rainfall totals from March into early April.

== River flooding ==
River flooding continued through March and into April; even stretching to early May in a few areas. Several river gauges throughout the Midwest and southeast were in major flood stage. Some of the worst river flooding of the event occurred in the western suburbs of St. Louis, Missouri, along the Meramec River; 451 homes were damaged in this area. River flooding stretched from Wisconsin to Louisiana by mid-April; some of the flooding to the north was exacerbated by ice jams after record snowfall during the winter.

== Impact ==
=== Deaths ===
The death toll associated with the flooding was 17. Five deaths occurred in Missouri. Others were killed in a highway wreck due to heavy rain in Kentucky, and a 65-year-old woman in Ohio appeared to have drowned while checking on a sump pump in her home. In southern Illinois, two bodies were found hours after floodwaters swept a pickup truck off a road. Also, in Missouri, the body of a 19-year-old man was found about 2 miles downstream from where he was reported swept into a creek the previous evening.

=== Regional impacts ===
The flooding closed a number of roads in Missouri around the Meramec River, and threatened to force the closure of Interstate 44 at Valley Park. Unlike the Great Flood of 1993, which affected this same region, the majority of homes and businesses in Valley Park were protected from the flooding by a new levee built in 2005. In Kentucky, the flooding resulted in scattered road closures and flooded basements. In Covington, city crews used sump pumps to keep high water off the streets. High water from Banklick Creek also forced Kenton County's Pioneer Park to close. Emergency managers in Posey County, Indiana declared a state of emergency and Vanderburgh County, Indiana and the city of Evansville were also under states of emergency for a short time. Schools in Henderson and Union Counties were closed due to the flooding, and U.S. 60 at the line between the two counties was shut down because of landslides. Numerous roads were closed because of flooding in the Louisville, Kentucky area: Old Vincennes Road at Buttontown Road and Clover Creek and Hamby Road and Borden Road at U.S. 150.

== Aftermath ==
The Federal Emergency Management Agency denied flood recovery grants and loans to Illinois. Fifteen counties in southern Illinois applied for the assistance. In Illinois, 39 homes were destroyed, 150 others had major damage, and 145 businesses were flooded. Out of those 145 businesses that needed repairs after the floods, 74 of the buildings were in Harrisburg, Illinois.

== See also ==
- Winter storms of 2007-08
- June 2008 Midwest floods
