= Angola Red Cross =

- Abbreviation: CVA
- Founded: 1978
- Type: Non-profit organisation
- Purpose: Humanitarian Aid
- Location: Angola
- Affiliations: International Committee of the Red Cross; International Federation of Red Cross and Red Crescent Societies

The Angola Red Cross (Portuguese: Cruz Vermelha de Angola; CVA) was founded in 1978. It has its headquarters in Luanda.
