= June 2008 Midwest floods =

Weather outbreak that lead to flooding in the American Midwest

June 2008 Midwestern U.S. floods
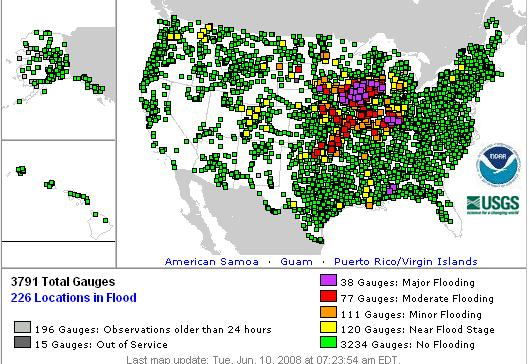
- Map of river flooding as of June 10, 2008

Meteorological history
- Duration: June 7 - July 1

Overall effects
- Fatalities: 16
- Damage: $6 billion+
- Areas affected: Illinois, Indiana, Iowa, Missouri, Minnesota and Wisconsin

The June 2008 Midwestern United States floods were flooding events which affected portions of the Midwestern United States. After months of heavy precipitation, a number of rivers overflowed their banks for several weeks at a time and broke through levees at numerous locations. Flooding continued into July. States affected by the flooding included Illinois, Indiana, Iowa, Michigan, Minnesota, Missouri and Wisconsin. The American Red Cross assisted the victims of flooding and tornadoes across seven states and the National Guard was mobilized to assist in disaster relief and evacuation.

Flooding continued as long as two weeks with central Iowa and Cedar Rapids being hardest hit. The upper Mississippi Valley experienced flooding in Missouri and Illinois as the region's estuaries drained the floodwater into the river. The flood left thirteen dead and damage region-wide was estimated to be in the tens of billions of dollars.

== Illinois ==
June 2008 Illinois flood
Meteorological history
- Duration: June 7 - June 28

Overall effects
- Fatalities: 1 death
- Damage: $31.2 million
- Areas affected: Adams, Hancock, Henderson, Mercer counties

On June 11, Illinois Governor Rod Blagojevich deemed Clark, Coles, Crawford, Cumberland, Jasper and Lawrence counties as disaster areas. Levee breaks on June 10 flooded portions of Lawrence County near Lawrenceville, inundating a campsite and forcing the evacuations of 200 homes.

On June 14 many communities located along the Mississippi River in West Central Illinois were notified by the National Weather Service that crests along the river would exceed the record crests of 1993.

On the early morning of June 14, the town of Oquawka, Illinois, was evacuated, due to a levee breach along the swollen Iowa River. The city council believed this would affect the flood waters in the already flooding Mississippi River. The same day two levees broke near the town of Keithsburg, Illinois, flooding the entire town.

On the morning of June 15, a levee along the Mississippi River in the town of Gulfport failed, flooding most of the town. Two more levees were breached by flood waters in western Illinois on June 18. The breaches flooded farmland near Meyer and forced an evacuation of the town.

More than $7.2 million in federal disaster assistance grants and loans were approved by the Federal Emergency Management Agency and the U.S. Small Business Administration for Illinois residents who suffered damages and losses.

== Indiana ==
June 2008 Indiana flood
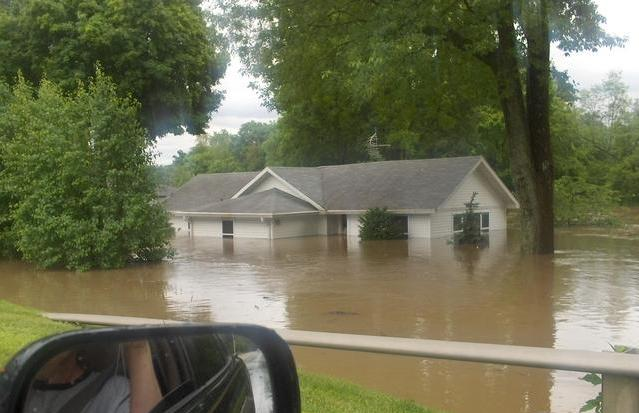
- House on the Southern Johnson County, Indiana, line underwater due to flooding

Meteorological history
- Duration: June 7 - June 16

Overall effects
- Fatalities: 3 deaths
- Damage: estimated: $126 million — $1 billion
- Areas affected: 54 of 92 counties Public and Individual; Assistance: 33 Counties Adams, Bartholomew, Benton, Boone, Brown, Carroll, Clay, Daviess, Dearborn, Elkhart, Fountain, Franklin, Fulton, Gibson, Greene, Hamilton, Hancock, Henry, Huntington, Jackson, Jay Jefferson, Jennings, Johnson, Knox, LaGrange, Lawrence, Madison, Marion, Martin, Miami, Monroe, Montgomery, Morgan, Newton, Ohio, Owen, Parke, Pike, Posey, Putnam, Randolph, Ripley, Rush, Decatur, Shelby, Sullivan, Tippecanoe, Union, Vanderburgh Vermillion, Vigo, Wabash, Warrick, Wayne, and White counties.

Central and southwestern Indiana was particularly hard hit by flooding along the Ohio River and its tributaries; damages were expected to make the flooding the costliest disaster in the history of the state. Starting on June 4, 2008, rain soaked parts of south-central Indiana, leading to initial floods in and around Bloomington. Additional rain on June 7 brought the worst of the flooding to larger portions of south-central and western Indiana. The highest recorded rainfall was in the town of Edinburgh, which saw 10.94 inches (278 mm) of rain in seven hours. Paragon had 10 inches (250 mm) of rain in just a few hours, leaving 90% of the town underwater.

Some parts of the state had flood levels exceeding records set in 1913. On June 9, President George W. Bush declared 29 counties in central Indiana a major disaster area, enabling the region to receive federal aid and Federal Emergency Management Agency assistance.

=== Impact ===
Many low-lying areas of central and northern Indiana were evacuated because of the rapid rise of the waters. Indiana Governor Mitch Daniels declared a state of emergency in 23 counties and called in the United States Coast Guard to assist in evacuations and rescues. The Coast Guard responded by sending two helicopters to the state along with boats and personnel. The Indiana National Guard was called out to assist in evacuation and direct traffic and enforce road blocks on the many flooded roads. Some areas of southern Indianapolis, where the White River was several feet past flood stage, were evacuated. This included a hospital with one hundred patients and doctors. The Coast Guard continued to rescue trapped citizens on June 8. In Franklin, Indiana water rose as high as the first floor of Johnson Memorial Hospital. Doctors and patients were also evacuated from Columbus Regional Hospital in Columbus, Indiana. The hospital had to remain closed for an extended period of time because of power outages, generator failures, and extensive flood damage. It was expected to resume operations between September and December 2008, although emergency services began more quickly. All patients were evacuated and moved to nearby hospitals. One hundred and fifty people were evacuated from a nursing home in Morgan County.

Map of Indiana showing counties designated disaster areas for various types of relief for the flood of June 2008. Public Assistance Public and Individual Assistance Individual Assistance Public Assistance (Category B) limited to direct Federal assistance Individual Assistance and Public Assistance (Category B) limited to direct Federal assistance

The dam at Prince's Lake failed on June 7, threatening the community of Nineveh, Indiana. On June 8 the Wabash Valley between Lafayette and Terre Haute, Indiana, was placed under flood alert; all residents near the Wabash River were urged to evacuate their homes.

Looting was reported in Seymour, Indiana, where the White River had overflowed its banks and forced the evacuation of over one hundred homes. Governor Daniels dispatched extra state police to the city to curb the looting. On June 10, five hundred members of the Indiana National Guard were mobilized to assist Indiana in coping with the flood damage and rescuing stranded citizens. The same day floodwaters rose above record levels in at least five localities. In others the rising waters were near or at the historic 1913 flood levels. The flooding was the worst in Indiana's modern history, according to Scott Morlock, a hydrologist with the U.S. Geological Survey in Indiana.

Many roads were closed because of high water, including Interstate 65, which was closed southbound at the interchange with Interstate 465 through Seymour. On June 16 Ball State University released a report estimating that preliminary damages in the state would cost at least $126 million, with $45.8 million in damage to public infrastructure and the rest damage to private businesses and homes. Although damage estimates are likely to be revised upward, the current estimate ranks the flood as the second costliest in Indiana history. Governor Mitch Daniels said the state is compiling its own thorough estimates, with total damages expected to top $1 billion. This would include agricultural costs (of over $800 million) and clean-up efforts not included in the Ball State University Study. The agricultural damages from this flood event varied dramatically since the timing of the flood permitted extensive replanting. The joint Ball State University and University of Tennessee study by Mark Burton and Michael J. Hicks excluded not only agricultural damage in Indiana, but also did not include any large public structures (e.g. hospitals) located in flood plains.

=== Deaths ===
Two deaths were reported in Columbus. The first was confirmed by the Department of Homeland Security on June 8, and the body of the second was discovered on June 9. A third man drowned in flood waters near Remington in the northwestern part of the state.

== Iowa ==
June 2008 Iowa flood
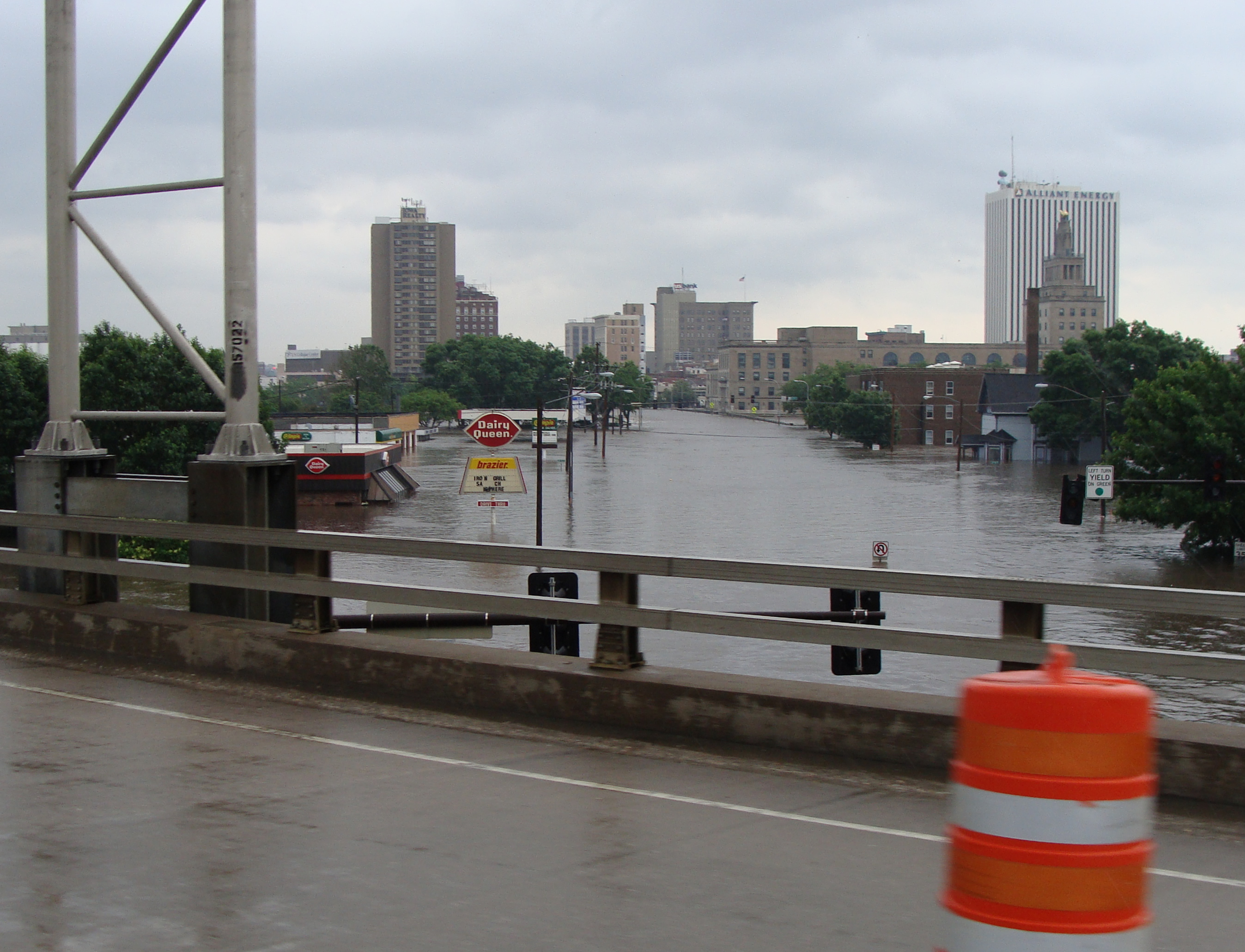
- Looking towards downtown Cedar Rapids, Iowa, on June 12

Meteorological history
- Duration: June 7 - July 1

Overall effects
- Fatalities: 2 deaths
- Damage: $10 billion+

Severe flooding in Iowa led to evacuations of many homes. In eastern Iowa along the Iowa River and Cedar River, flooding was expected to exceed that of the Flood of 1993. Flooding also forced the closure of a number of roads throughout the state, reaching the point where travel was not advised in some parts of the state.

On Monday, June 9 the Upper Iowa River in Decorah flooded when a levee was breached. Up to 6 inches (152 mm) of rain had fallen in the 48 hours prior. The water flooded parts of the lower campus of Luther College, damaging athletic fields and the Regents Center. Winneshiek County officials called this the worst flood to occur in Decorah since the current levee system was put in place in the 1940s. Other portions of the city were flooded. For a time, worries of losing the sanitary sewer system led to a 'please don't flush' order; as of Friday, 13 June 2008, this order was withdrawn, but pleas for careful use remain in effect. Decorah and Winneshiek County now face a difficult cleanup.

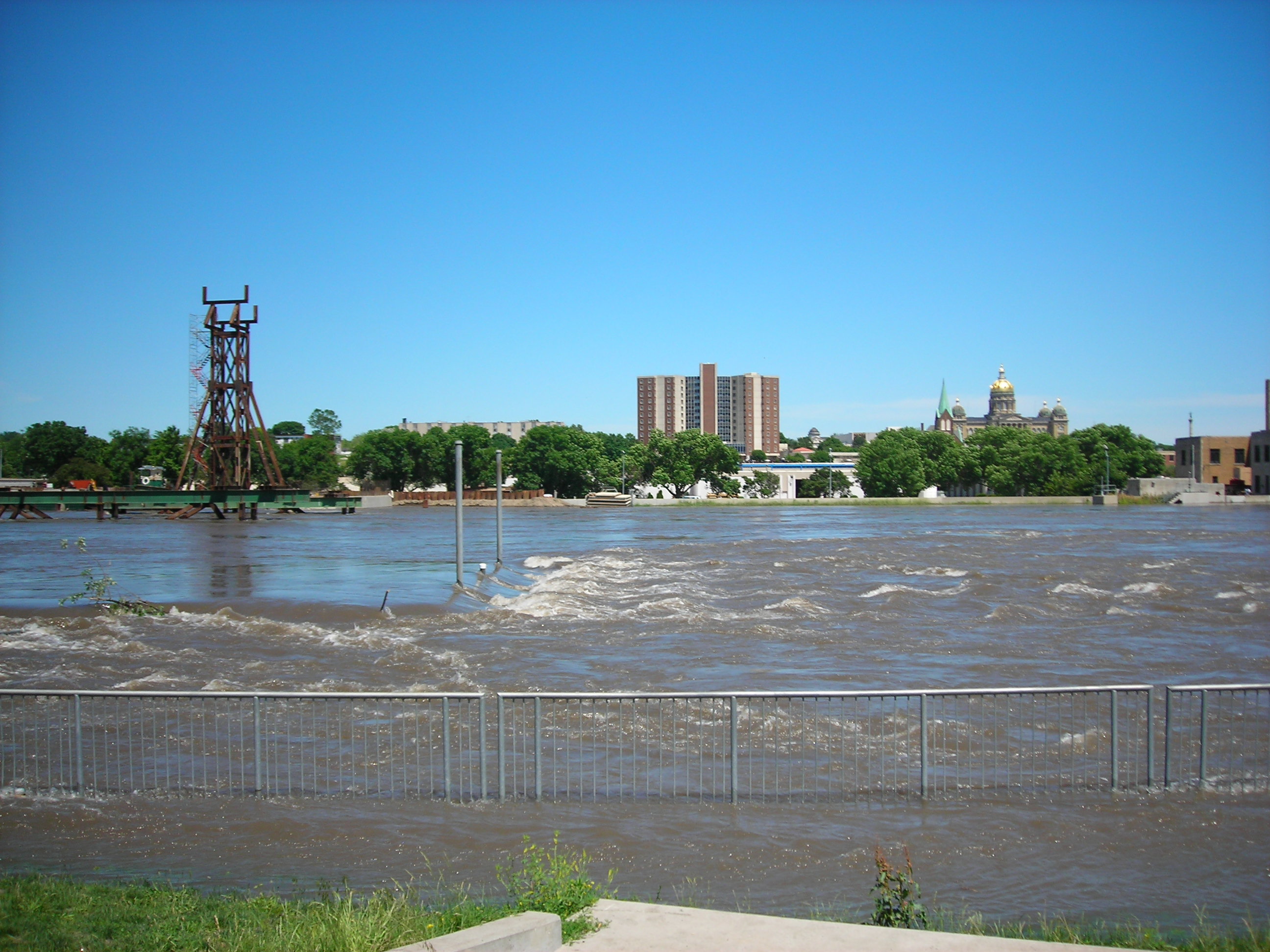
The Des Moines River threatened downtown businesses and prompted officials to call for a voluntary evacuation

Further downstream on the Upper Iowa, in the small historic unincorporated area of Dorchester, severe flooding was experienced. In particular, a trailer court sustained major damage.

Along the Mississippi River, flood waters were reaching near-record levels. In Burlington, the Mississippi reached three different crests, before hitting 22.3 feet (6.8 m) on June 10, the fourth highest stage in the city's history; as of June 15, the expected crest was supposed to be around the 25.8-foot (7.9 m) mark, which would make it the second worst flood in the city's history, surpassing 1993 by 0.7 feet (0.21 m). This caused the Burlington Steamboat Days to cancel and close up three days early, the first such occurrence that the festival has closed more than one day early since its inception in 1962. Severe flooding caused the city to close off an entire section of the riverfront, from Main Street to the riverfront. By the morning of June 15, several streets within the city had been closed off, including the entire length of Front Street; a section of Main Street, between Division Street, and Jefferson Street; a section of Mill Dam Road; Tama Road and all of its side roads; and County Highway 99. U.S. Highway 61, five miles (8 km) south of the city, had been closed on the morning of June 13 due to the rising waters of the Skunk River.

Along the upper Turkey River, the historic towns of Spillville and Fort Atkinson experienced significant flooding, with damaged roads and bridge approaches. Further downstream, portions of Elkader were under water; the river had retreated by Thursday, June 12.

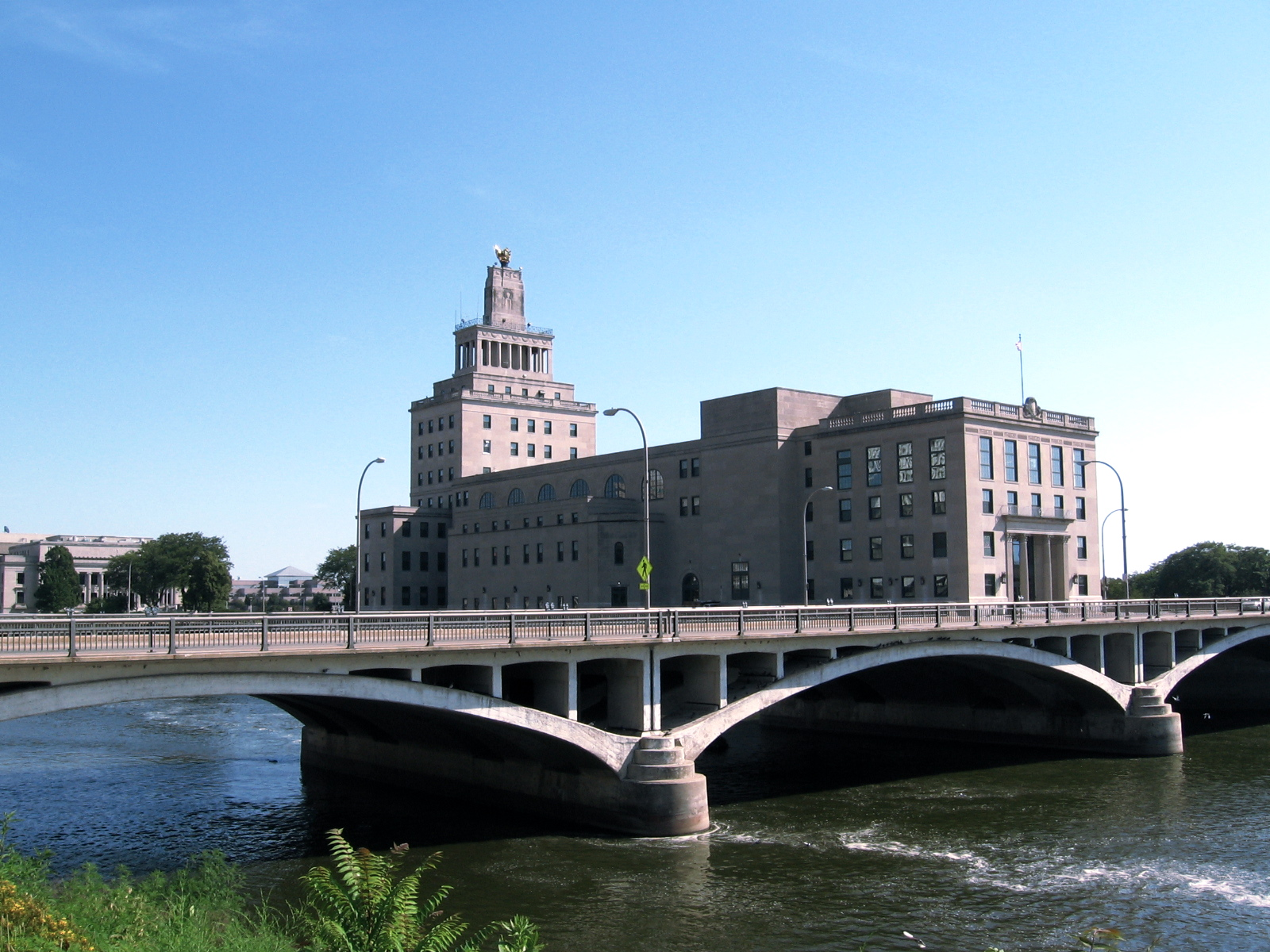

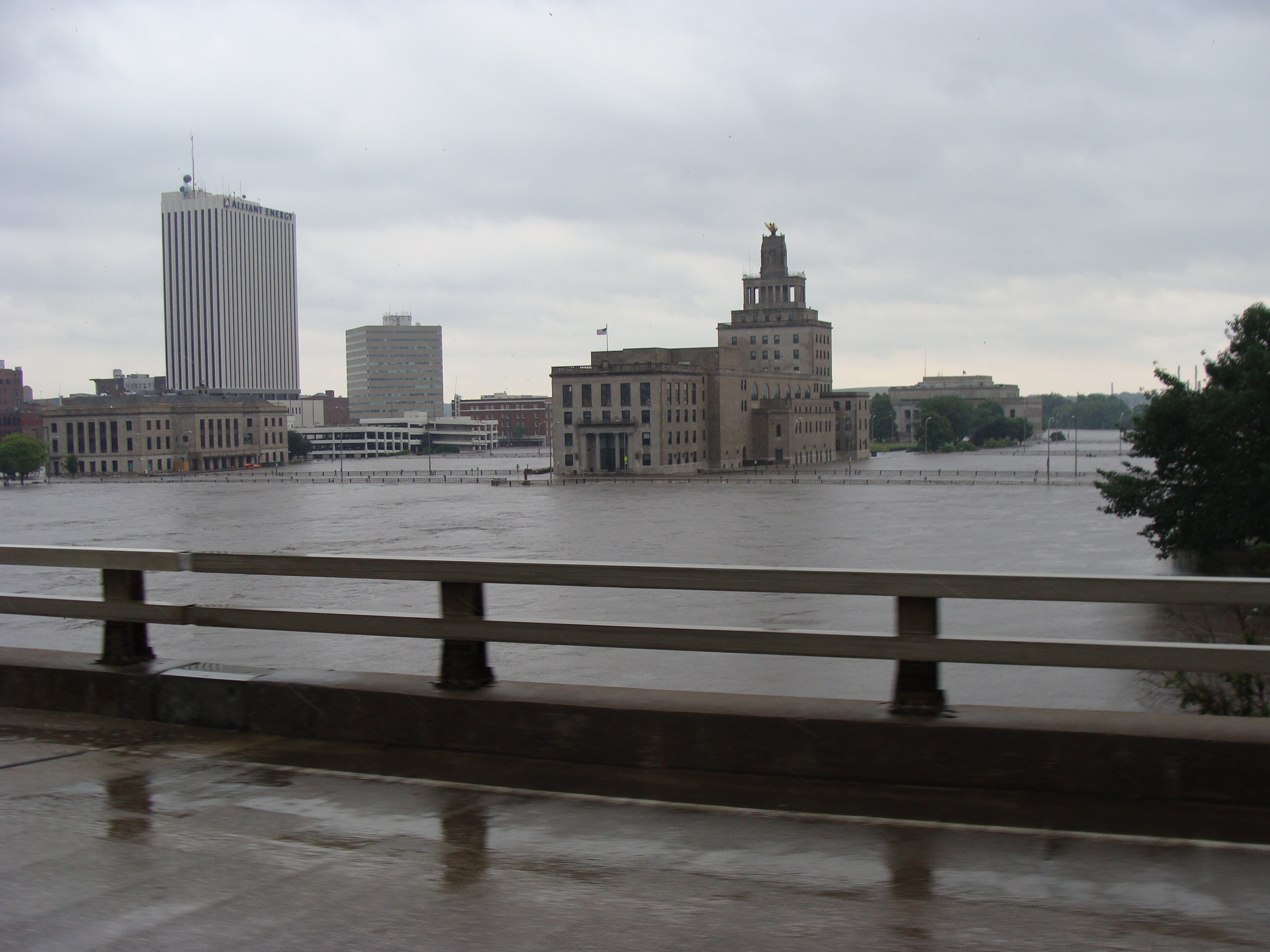
Mays Island, where municipal buildings are located and were flooded to the second story. The water level of the Cedar River on July 7, 2007 (above) and the same bridge submerged (below) on June 12, 2008.

In Cedar Rapids, officials were readying residents and downtown business owners to evacuate as the Cedar River threatened to spill over a levee. The river was expected to top the levee June 11, prompting a mandatory evacuation of downtown. All of the bridges over the Cedar River in downtown Cedar Rapids were closed at 8:00 pm CDT (0100 UTC) on June 11. On June 12, a levee broke, a railroad bridge owned by the Cedar Rapids and Iowa City Railway was swept away along with loaded rail cars (which had been filled with rock in an attempt to keep the bridge in place, or failing that, cause it to sink to the bottom very close to its original location), 100 city blocks were submerged downtown, and 10,000 people were evacuated. In Waterloo, fast-moving water swept away a railroad bridge used to transport tractors from a John Deere factory to Cedar Rapids. It also prompted the city to shut its downtown and close five bridges. The Black Hawk County Emergency Management Agency recommended the evacuation of the Cedar Terrace Neighborhood in Southeast Waterloo on June 10. Because of the severe flooding in east-central Iowa, officials with U.S. Postal Service's Des Moines-based Hawkeye District suspended all Retail, Post Office Box and Mail Caller Services at the Waterloo Main Post Office.

On June 12, a mandatory evacuation was issued for the Normandy Drive area of Iowa City. An evacuation of two streets in Coralville was also issued, with the expectations of completing it by 5:00 pm CDT (2200 UTC) on June 12. One person died in the Iowa flooding. A section of Interstate 80 was closed in Cedar County due to flooding.

The small town of Palo, just upstream from Cedar Rapids, and home of Iowa's only nuclear power plant, underwent a mandatory evacuation. The town remained under water until June 13, 2008.

At 3:43 am on the morning of June 14, the National Weather Service in Des Moines Iowa issued a Flash Flood Warning for the City of Des Moines due to a 50-foot-wide (15 m) levee breach along the Des Moines River in Des Moines near Birdland Park between 6th Avenue and New York Avenue.

In the evening of June 14, a levee along the Iowa River near Oakville, Iowa, failed, causing the swollen waters to rampage through, two days before the mandatory evacuation deadline in the town of Oakville. This also caused evacuation in the Huron Township area. Also, during that same time, an area of the city of Burlington, Iowa, was evacuated, along Tama Road, due to a levee problem along the swollen Mississippi River; the levee began to bulge and was threatening to fail by mid afternoon. By nightfall, it was still holding, but hopes were not high that it would remain intact; this caused Des Moines County to issue an evacuation order for all residents of the county that live east of County Highway 99. By the morning of June 15, the entire length of County Highway 99 within Des Moines County had been closed. By the morning of June 16, three more bulges were discovered along the levee, prompting workers to state that it was no longer a question of if but when the levee would fail. On June 16, Cedar, Jones, Louisa, Muscatine, Polk, and Winneshiek Counties were approved for federal individual assistance.

== Michigan ==
June 2008 Michigan flood
Meteorological history
- Duration: June 7 - June 16

Overall effects
- Fatalities: 8 deaths
- Damage: $17.8 million

Several tornadoes touched down in southern Michigan and flooding led to evacuation of many homes. At least eight people died, due to a combination of blowing debris, flooding, and infrastructure failures. On June 14 a State of Emergency is declared for the counties of Allegan, Eaton, and Mason. In days leading up to the State of Emergency, 8 to 11 inches (280 mm) of rain has fallen and winds have been recorded at 98 miles per hour across the area. Officials in Allegan County are expecting to spend nearly $700,000 to repair collapsed roads. More than 50 roads in Mason County were closed due to severe damage, as well as several miles of US-10 and US-31. In the City of Ludington damage to the city's public utilities has left many without drinking water and sewage contamination in the area.

== Minnesota ==
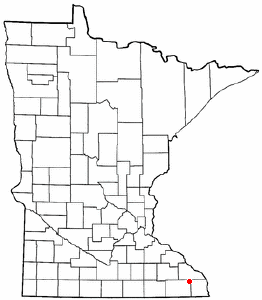
Southeastern Minnesota has experienced heavier rainfall than other parts of the state in 2008. The city of Rushford had experienced major flooding the year prior in August and the additional water damage was notable from the heavy rainfall.

Approximately 75 homes in Preston, Minnesota, suffered water damage from excessive rainfall. The ground was already saturated from heavy rains from the previous week and this compounded the problems that arose. Some residents were evacuated in Hayfield, Minnesota, after the Zumbro River flooded. The Cedar River also flooded which threatened to cause problems in Austin, Minnesota. One man died when his vehicle plunged into a flooded creek near Albert Lea. There were major levees in Des Moines and Cedar Rapids that were breached which forced evacuations and caused extensive damage. The majority of the communities along the Mississippi River from Rock Island, IL to Cape Girardeau, MO were still experiencing major flooding around the end of June.

== Missouri ==
June 2008 Missouri flood
Meteorological history
- Duration: June 10 - July 28

Overall effects
- Areas affected: Clark, Pike, Lincoln, St. Charles

Missouri's battle with the floods of the summer of 2008 began at the end of May, when the Wentzville Fire Protection District had to close several roads in the area and ended up fielding 58 calls for service in a single 24 hour period. The deluge of storms led to a quick rise of water on the Mississippi River which saw water crest ten feet above flood stage in Hannibal, Missouri, on June 10. The National Weather Service predicted that the flood stage could be higher in the next two weeks. Most of the towns near the river are protected by levees, but outlying areas are vulnerable to flooding.

On June 1, 2008, Governor Blunt declared a state-wide emergency and on June 15 requested the approval of a "major disaster" declaration from the federal government, which was officially approved on June 25. On June 17, 2008, Steve Ehlmann, the county executive for St. Charles County, declared a state of emergency and the sandbagging of levees, airports and other essential infrastructure began that day.

Multiple levees were breached or topped before the Mississippi river crested during the last weekend in June. On June 27, 2008, muskrat holes weakened a Mississippi River levee, allowing floodwaters to pour into Lincoln County, Missouri. The levee was the last one remaining in Lincoln County and was protecting about 100 homes. Sheriff's deputies alerted residents to evacuate. Sirens also went off to warn residents of the levee breach. Muskrats looking for food or making dens had dug into the levee, weakening it enough for the levee to breach.

Missouri River flooding continues to cause more damage over the last decade. There have been major flooding events June - August 2011, December 2015 thru January 2016, and April - May 2017. In March 2019 the Missouri River flooded almost every levee devastating countless farms and homes in Holt County, Missouri. The rise in water levels begin as early as September and October leaving the county soil saturated as the grounds free along the Missouri River and continues to cause more property damage in the spring during cyclone season.

== Wisconsin ==
June 2008 Wisconsin flood
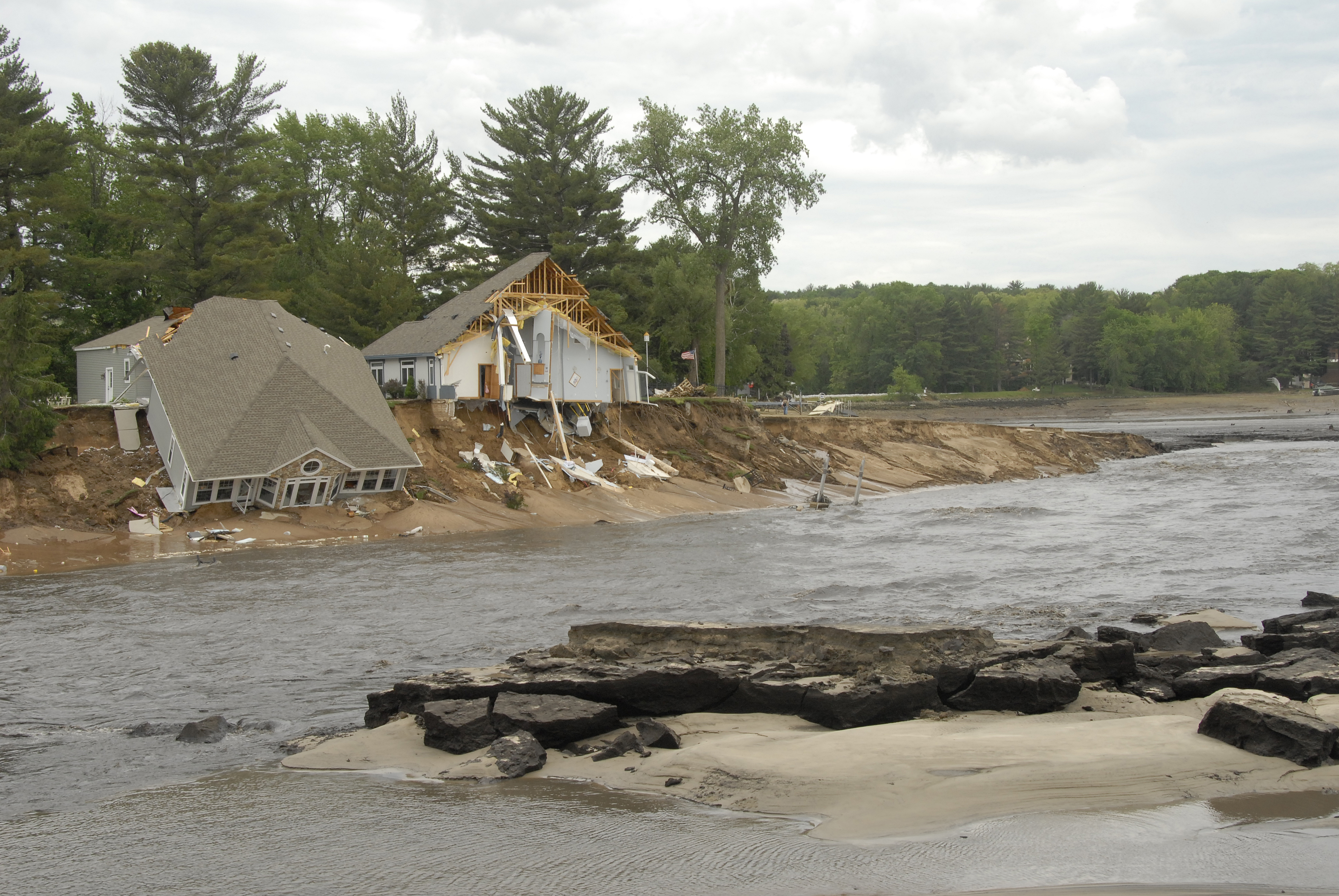
- Dell Creek Breach of Lake Delton

Meteorological history
- Duration: June 7 - June 21

Overall effects
- Fatalities: 1 death
- Damage: $664.6 million
- Areas affected: Adams, Calumet, Columbia, Crawford, Dane, Dodge, Fond du Lac, Grant, Green, Green Lake, Iowa, Jefferson, Juneau, Kenosha, Lafayette, La Crosse, Marquette, Milwaukee, Monroe, Ozaukee, Racine, Richland, Rock, Sauk, Sheboygan, Vernon, Walworth, Washington, Waukesha and Winnebago counties.

On June 7, at least six confirmed tornadoes touched down in multiple counties, as an effect of the strong winds of the daily storms.

Wisconsin Governor Jim Doyle declared a state of emergency in thirty counties on June 9 due to the flooding. The Federal Emergency Management Agency (FEMA) inspectors are due to examine areas that suffered the most damage.

Continued heavy rains in the Wisconsin Dells led to the Dell creek bypassing the dam holding Lake Delton. On June 9, water rushing out of the lake eroded a section of County Highway A and washed away three homes and tore apart several others. The lake became nearly empty and the escaping flood water created a new channel for the Wisconsin River about a quarter mile away from the dam. Wisconsin National Guard engineers began repairs on the dam the same day, but with the breach being about 400 feet (120 m) wide, the repairs weren't expected to be completed for over a year. However, as Governor Jim Doyle called the lake critical to the $1 billion Wisconsin Dells tourism industry, he said the Department of Natural Resources was trying to figure out how to get the water flowing in the man-made lake. Soon tourists who had made summer reservations at the lake's twenty resorts began canceling their reservations. The response of the local businesses was varied. The Delton Oaks Resort, a 60-year operation, closed temporarily. Meanwhile, the iconic Wisconsin Dells boat tours reopened despite the low water level. The Tommy Bartlett Show continued, though the waterskiing aspect was discarded at least until the lake was refilled the following year. Nearby Devil's Lake was also flooded, one lake house was nearly totaled, and both of the beaches were washed away.

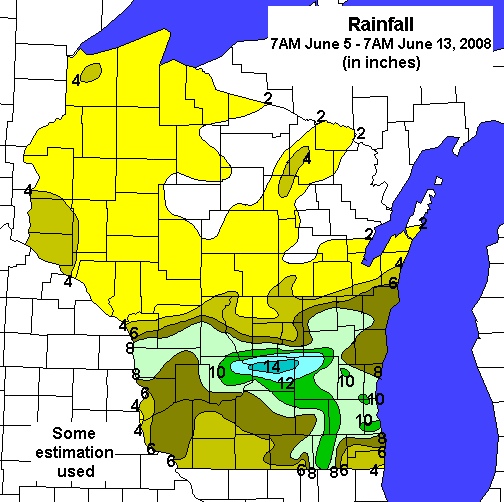
NWS map of Wisconsin rainfall totals for 5 June 2008 to 13 June 2008.

In southwestern Wisconsin, the Kickapoo River rose several feet above flood stage, destroying most of the village of Gays Mills. Gays Mills had already been badly flooded in the August 2007 floods. Officials said Kickapoo River flood damage in Vernon County likely will exceed the $60 million damage caused by the August 2007 floods, and already the water was two feet higher than the high water mark of a historic 1978 flood. In the early morning of June 9, 150 residents in the village of 625 were forced to evacuate. Ontario, Hillsboro, La Farge, Steuben and Viola were also severely flooded, much worse than in August 2007. The county took an average of 9 inches (230 mm) of rain over the second weekend, causing mudslides and closing over 100 roads in Vernon, but the rain relented on Monday, June 16th. More thunderstorms, and more severe flooding, were expected in both Vernon and Crawford counties later that week. All the nearby dams held, though many sustained damage.

Wisconsin counties presidentially declared as disasters and designated to receive various types of assistance following the June 2008 floods. Public Assistance Public and Individual Assistance Individual Assistance

Westbound lanes of Interstate 94 were closed between Johnson Creek and Lake Mills on June 10, 2008, at 7 pm because of the rising Rock River. Eastbound lanes of Interstate 90/Interstate 94 were closed between WIS 82 in Juneau County and WIS 33 west of Portage. Also, Interstate 39 was closed in two places: Northbound at its interchange with I-90/94 and WIS 78, and southbound between WIS 82 and WIS 33. The closure of I-94 westbound in Jefferson County was extended eastward to WIS 83 in Waukesha County. The closure of the interstates around Portage were extended southward to US 151 east of Madison.

The first reported fatality due to flooding in the state was confirmed June 14 in Waukesha County. 68-year-old Robert Schaf was found near his car on a flooded road in the town of Summit. Authorities report he died after being stranded on a flooded road, and was found in at least three feet of water.

Flooding also affected the communities on the Baraboo River. The town of North Freedom had all but one road into town closed because of flooding. The flooding forced the closure of the Mid-Continent Railway Museum.

On June 14, federal disaster aid from FEMA was authorized under a major disaster declaration issued for the state by President George W. Bush. Federal funding was made available to affected individuals in Columbia, Crawford, Milwaukee, Sauk, and Vernon counties. Continuing damage surveys were conducted, especially in the southeast, and Wisconsin's inhabitants were reassured that other counties would be allowed to receive assistance. Richland and Racine counties were declared disaster areas on June 16. On June 18, the President put five more counties under disaster area status, allowing Dodge, Green, Waukesha, Washington, and Winnebago. At the time of the announcement, the first 7 counties had already received almost $38,000 in FEMA aid.

The rainfall in southeastern Wisconsin was anywhere from 6 to 12 inches in the string of thunderstorms. Waukesha County had up to 8 inches in certain areas. As of June 19, municipal estimates for Waukesha County was $87.7 million, $3.2 million more than earlier in the week, though the total remains fluid.

The Rock and Crawfish rivers were still above flood stage in Jefferson and Rock counties into mid-July.

== Public health concerns ==
In city or country, suburb or industrial area, the main public health hazard was the polluted water, mixed with the outflow of overwhelmed sanitary sewer systems, petroleum products and a variety of other toxic materials, to include asbestos. As the waters recede, tremendous amounts of potentially infectious debris added to the problem; this included uncollected garbage and dead animals. This issue was exacerbated by the onset of the hot and humid summer weather. Just making the affected areas sanitary again was a huge undertaking. The problem of mold propagating in flooded buildings was one of major concern.

Skin contact with polluted water and flood soaked items can cause rashes, and a contact with a skin cut may result in a variety of infections. Public officials warned of a potential increase in waterborne diseases such as dysentery as well as an increased population of mosquitoes, which can carry West Nile virus.

Free tetanus shots were being offered in many areas, including Cedar Rapids and Iowa City.

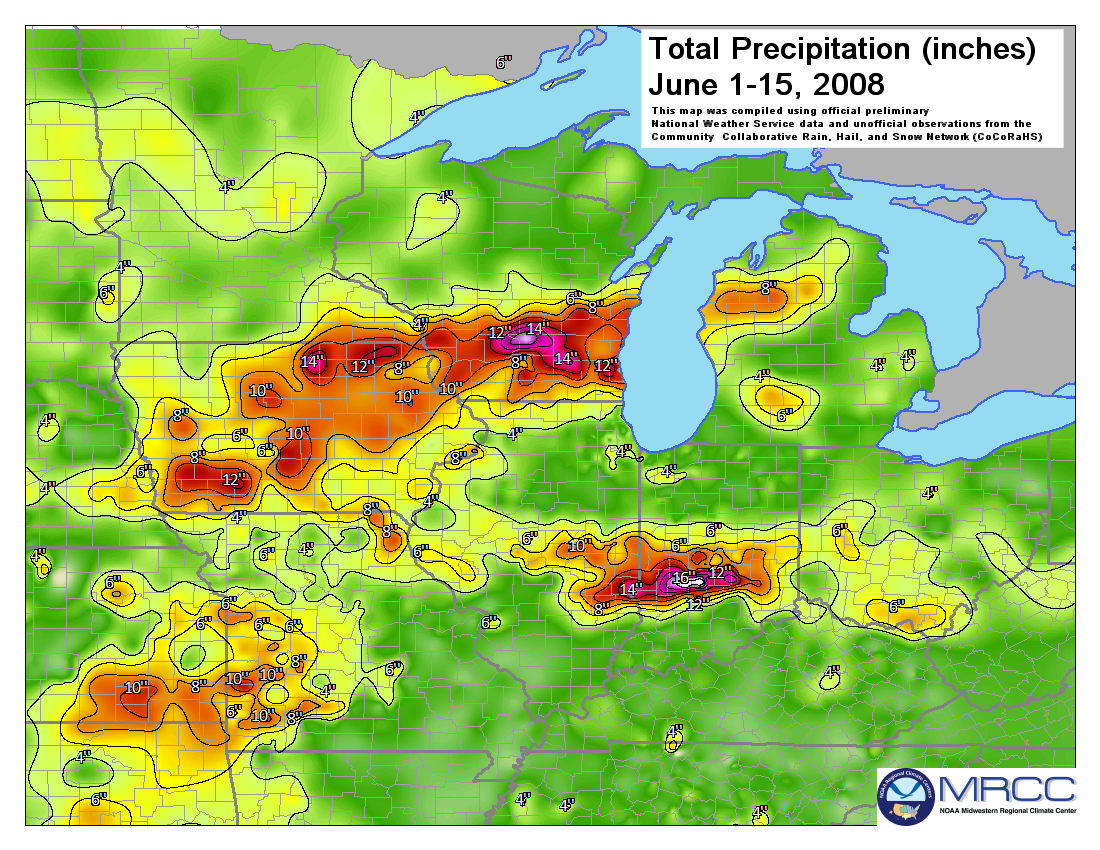
Rainfall totals from June 1 through June 15th 2008 over the Upper Midwest

In addition to physical disease, residents were warned of potential mental health problems. Parents were told to expect developmental regressions in child survivors of the flood, especially those who lost their homes. Even in adults, the stress of applying for services and managing daily activities under catastrophic conditions, along with the summer heat and number of people needing the same things, was expected to exacerbate pre-existing anxiety, depression, or family conflict. The physical and emotional stress of cleaning out flooded homes was only part of the trouble, as parents needed to manage all of this while still caring for children who were home on summer vacation. Long-term consequences were expected as well. "Once the original shock and dismay pass, the losses of such things as wedding photos or treasured family heirlooms can lead to depression and even post-traumatic stress disorder," said one official.

Some rural areas suffered from a lack of access to badly needed public and social services, and agencies were overwhelmed with the increase of people needing assistance. Also, due to the large area of the Midwest affected by this event, some rivers and tributaries took an abnormally long time to recede, with some areas remaining flooded for up to four weeks. The increased amount of standing water and flood-affected ground caused a summer-long increased population of biting midge gnats (sand flies), fungus gnats, flies, and mosquitoes, with the above-mentioned public health concerns.

== See also ==
- 2007 Midwest flooding
- June 2008 tornado outbreak sequence
- Lakeshore Area Regional Recovery of Indiana
- March 2008 Midwest floods
- Floods in the United States before 1901
- Floods in the United States: 1901–2000
- Floods in the United States: 2001–present
