= The RoomPlace =

American furniture store

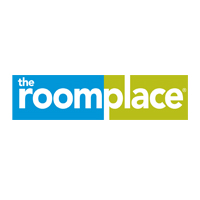
- Company type: Private
- Industry: Retail, manufacturing
- Founded: 1912; 114 years ago
- Founder: Sam Berman
- Defunct: April 2, 2025; 14 months ago
- Fate: Bankruptcy and liquidation
- Headquarters: Lombard, Illinois, United States
- Number of locations: 26 (2024)
- Key people: Bruce Berman
- Products: Furniture
- Owner: Bruce Berman
- Website: Archived official website at the Wayback Machine (archive index)

The RoomPlace was an American furniture retailer headquartered in Lombard, Illinois. The company had 26 locations across the Midwest up until 2024.

== History ==
The RoomPlace was founded back in 1912 by Sam Berman as a small furniture store in the West Town neighborhood of Chicago, Illinois. In 1950, they opened a new store on Harlem Avenue in Chicago, opening up as Harlem Furniture. A second store would open up over three decades later in 1985 between 79th Street and Cicero Avenue in Chicago, followed by several other new stores by 1990, in Hoffman Estates, Homewood, and Vernon Hills. A distribution center later opened up in Hillside by 1988.

In the early 2000s, Harlem Furniture would change its name to The RoomPlace. This was eventually followed by some new stores, including one in Orland Park, Illinois, and a distribution center expansion from 200,000 square feet to over 300,000+ square feet.

In 2011, Bruce Berman, the company's former CEO, won an auction to acquire the furniture retailer for $15.1 million. At this time, the company had around 23 operating stores.

=== 2016 warehouse fire and Indianapolis expansion ===
On April 21, 2016, a large fire at The RoomPlace's distribution center in Woodridge, IL, caused an estimated $40 million to $60 million in damages. No one was injured or killed in the incident but the building and its contents were a complete loss. The cause of the fire was confirmed to be a RoomPlace forklift operator, who lit a piece of paper on fire that eventually quickly spread across the distribution center. He was later identified to be 20-year-old Ruben Ochoa Cruz, who stated that he had a heated argument with his bosses over vacation time, stating that they were going to cut his vacation time because of missed days at work. Ultimately, he would be charged with federal arson charges in connection to the incident.

In 2018, Cruz was convicted on all charges, and was sentenced to 6 years in prison. The total cost in damages was estimated to be around $122 million.

In May 2016, The RoomPlace announced an expansion to the Indianapolis area within the coming months, with a new distribution center and 6 stores opening in the Indianapolis area by the end of 2016.

=== Bankruptcy ===
On February 2, 2024, The RoomPlace filed for Chapter 11 bankruptcy. The company stated that the filing would allow for them to align its costs with its projected sales and economic realties. As a result of the bankruptcy, one store in Kenosha, Wisconsin, one store in Peoria, Illinois, and all six Indianapolis-area stores are set to close within the coming months. The RoomPlace contracted Planned Furniture Promotions to conduct going-out-of-business sales for those stores, and began liquidation sales that same day. 83 employees will be impacted by the closings.

In July 2024, a bankruptcy court judge approved an auction for the sale of The RoomPlace's assets. Two bidders would seek to buy The RoomPlace, but both were ultimately let down. With no buyer found, The RoomPlace announced in September 2024 that they would close all of its remaining locations. Shortly after winding down operations, the company attempted to restructure again under their original name Harlem Furniture, and opened four stores, but this venture only lasted for a few months.

== Closure dates of each location after bankruptcy ==
- July 29, 2024: Peoria & Indianapolis (Michigan Rd.)
- August 5, 2024: Plainfield & Carmel
- August 12, 2024: Kenosha, Indianapolis (Castleton & Washington St.), & Greenwood
- October 29, 2024: McHenry
- December 4, 2024: Joliet
- December 9, 2024: Schaumburg
- December 10, 2024: Gurnee
- January 1, 2025: Merrillville
- January 5, 2025: Rockford
- January 7, 2025: Arlington Heights
- January 27, 2025: Homewood
- February 24, 2025: Chicago (Cicero Ave.)
- March 3, 2025: Orland Park
- March 23, 2025: Chicago (Elston Ave.)
- March 25, 2025: Algonquin
- March 31, 2025: Bloomingdale & Woodridge
- April 2, 2025: Aurora, Chicago (Harlem Ave.), Lincolnwood, & Lombard
  - These four locations reopened as Harlem Furniture almost immediately after closing as The RoomPlace, but are once again closing as of September 2025.
