= Namibia Red Cross Society =

Humanitarian organization in Namibia

- Founded: 1992
- Type: Non-profit organisation
- Purpose: Humanitarian Aid
- Location: Namibia
- Affiliations: International Committee of the Red Cross; International Federation of Red Cross and Red Crescent Societies
- Website: http://www.redcross.org.na

The Namibia Red Cross Society, also known as NRCS, is a humanitarian organisation with its headquarters in Windhoek, Namibia. Formerly part of the South African Red Cross Society, it was founded in 1991 by an Act of Parliament, and in 1993 was admitted as a member of the International Federation of the Red Cross and Red Crescent Societies.
