= Zákamenné =

Municipality in Orava, Slovakia

- Municipality
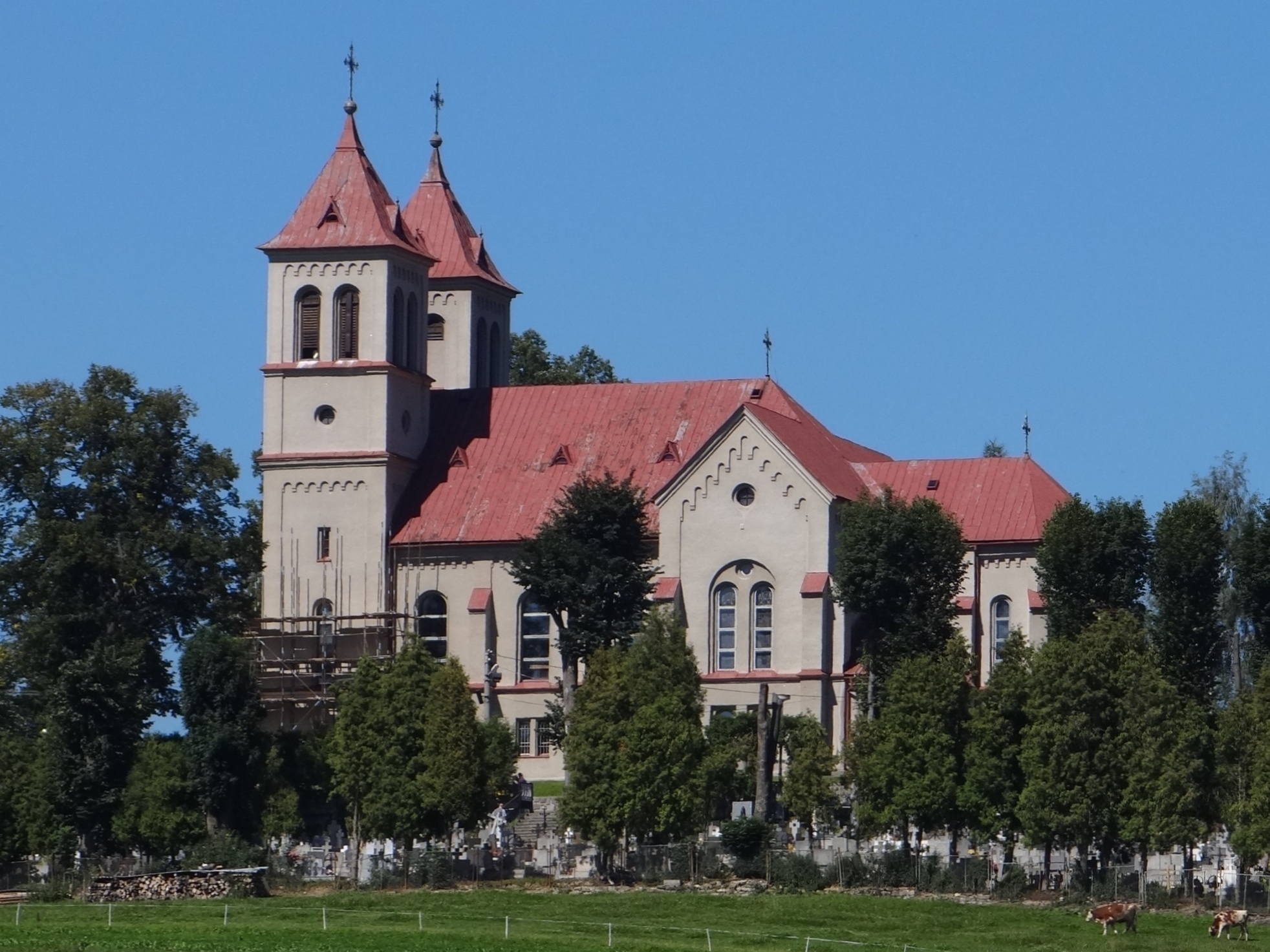

- Flag

- Location of Zákamenné in the Žilina Region Location of Zákamenné in Slovakia
- Coordinates: 49.39°N 19.30°E
- Country: Slovakia
- Region: Žilina Region
- District: Námestovo District
- First mentioned: 1615

Government
  - Mayor: Mgr. Peter Klimčik

Area
  - Total: 42.90 km^{2} (16.56 sq mi)
- Elevation: 703 m (2,306 ft)

Population (2025)
  - Total: 5,738
- Time zone: UTC+1 (CET)
  - Summer (DST): UTC+2 (CEST)
- Postal code: 295 6
- Area code: +421 43
- Vehicle registration plate (until 2022): NO
- Website: www.zakamenne.sk

Zákamenné (pol. Zakamienny Klin) is the biggest village in the Orava region in the northern part of Slovakia. Zákamenné lies in the north-western part of Orava. It belongs to the protected landscape area of Horná Orava and the specially protected area of Horná Orava. The villages which surround Zákamenné are Oravská Lesná, Novoť, Lomná, Breza, Krušetnica and Ujsoly in Poland.

== History ==
In historical records the village was first mentioned in 1615. The village was founded in 1615 on the feast of holy Jacob (28 July), but the first written mention dates from the 16th of July 1615.

== Geography and districts ==
The municipality lies at an altitude of 703 metres (2,306 ft) and covers an area of 42.90 km^{2} (16.56 sq mi) (2025).

=== Parts of Zákamenné ===
- Nižný koniec - entrance into village from Námestovo and Lokca. In this part are two banks, a supermarket, restaurant, pension, ski-lift, shops, health care and other services
- Poriečie - direction Novoť, to the polish border, village Ujsoly and frontier crossing
- Babinec
- Špitáľ or Ústredie - here is the municipal office, post, district bureau of employment, old church, school and kindergarten
- Farský Briežok
  - Pri kríži
- Podkamenné
  - Pri píle
  - Trchovnica
- Oravice - entrance into the village from Čadca. In this part is a kindergarten and industrial zone
- Mrzáčka (upper, lower) - new church
- Vyšný koniec
- Tanečník - railway station

== Population ==
Population statistic (10 years)
Year	1995	2005	2015	2025
Count	4534	4997	5367	5738
Difference		+10.21%	+7.40%	+6.91%

Population statistic
Year	2024	2025
Count	5694	5738
Difference		+0.77%

It has a population of 5738 people (31 December 2025).

=== Ethnicity ===
Census 2021 (1+ %)
Ethnicity	Number	Fraction
Slovak	5466	98.62%
Not found out	182	3.28%
Total	5542	

In year 2021 was 5542 people by ethnicity 5466 as Slovak, 182 as Not found out, 10 as Czech, 8 as Polish, 8 as Other, 1 as Ukrainian, 1 as Serbian, 1 as Romani, 1 as Russian and 1 as Moravian.

Note on population: The difference values of population numbers in the table "Population statistic" and in the sections "Ethnicity" & "Religion" is caused by the use of various statistical methods.

=== Religion ===
Census 2021 (1+ %)
Religion	Number	Fraction
Roman Catholic Church	5257	94.86%
None	136	2.45%
Not found out	78	1.41%
Total	5542	

In year 2021 was 5542 people by religion 5257 from Roman Catholic Church, 136 from None, 78 from Not found out, 17 from Christian Congregations in Slovakia, 11 from Evangelical Church, 11 from Ad hoc movements, 9 from Old Catholic Church, 6 from Jehovah's Witnesses, 5 from Other, 5 from Greek Catholic Church, 2 from Calvinist Church, 2 from Buddhism, 1 from Eastern Orthodox Church, 1 from Islam and 1 from Apostolic Church.

== Historic landmarks and attractions ==
- Calvary in Zákamenné
- Church of translation of Madonna in Zákamenné from year 1901. Built in Neoromance style. One from few churches with two towers in Orava region.
- Church of holy Joseph in Zákamenné - consecrated on 1 January 2000
- The Historical Logging Switchback Railway - Vychyľovka and Oravská Lesná. Narrow gauge railway pass steep elevation by switchbacks. Similar technical solution of similar difficult elevation was used only in Peru.
- Jewish cemetery
- Rowland stone

== Tourism ==
- Zákamenné belongs to the protected landscape area of Horná Orava and the specially protected area Horná Orava.
- In the village there are two ski-lifts: 1500 Kýčera and ski-lift 800 at Prípor hill
- The highest peak of Zákammené is Úšust (1156 m n.m.). It lies on the border with Poland and it is possible to see the West Tatras, Pilsko and Malá Fatra mountains in good weather conditions from this peak. On the Polish side of the mountain original fir-beech forests can be found.
- Accommodation is possible in four pensions and two hostels

== Transportation ==
- By the car: from towns Námestovo, Čadca, Žywiec
- By the bus: directions Námestovo - Zákamenné, Dolný Kubín - Zákamenné and Kraľovany - Zákamenné, more at http://www.cp.sk or https://www.ubian.sk
- By the train: directions Bratislava-Žilina-Kraľovany nad Košice-Kraľovany. In the Kraľovany passage to bus, possible straight connection into Zákamenné on Saturday, Friday and Sunday.

== Municipal office ==
The address of the municipal office is Zákamenné 746, 02956.
