= Yohanan Friedmann =

Israeli scholar of Islamic studies (born 1936)

- יוחנן פרידמן
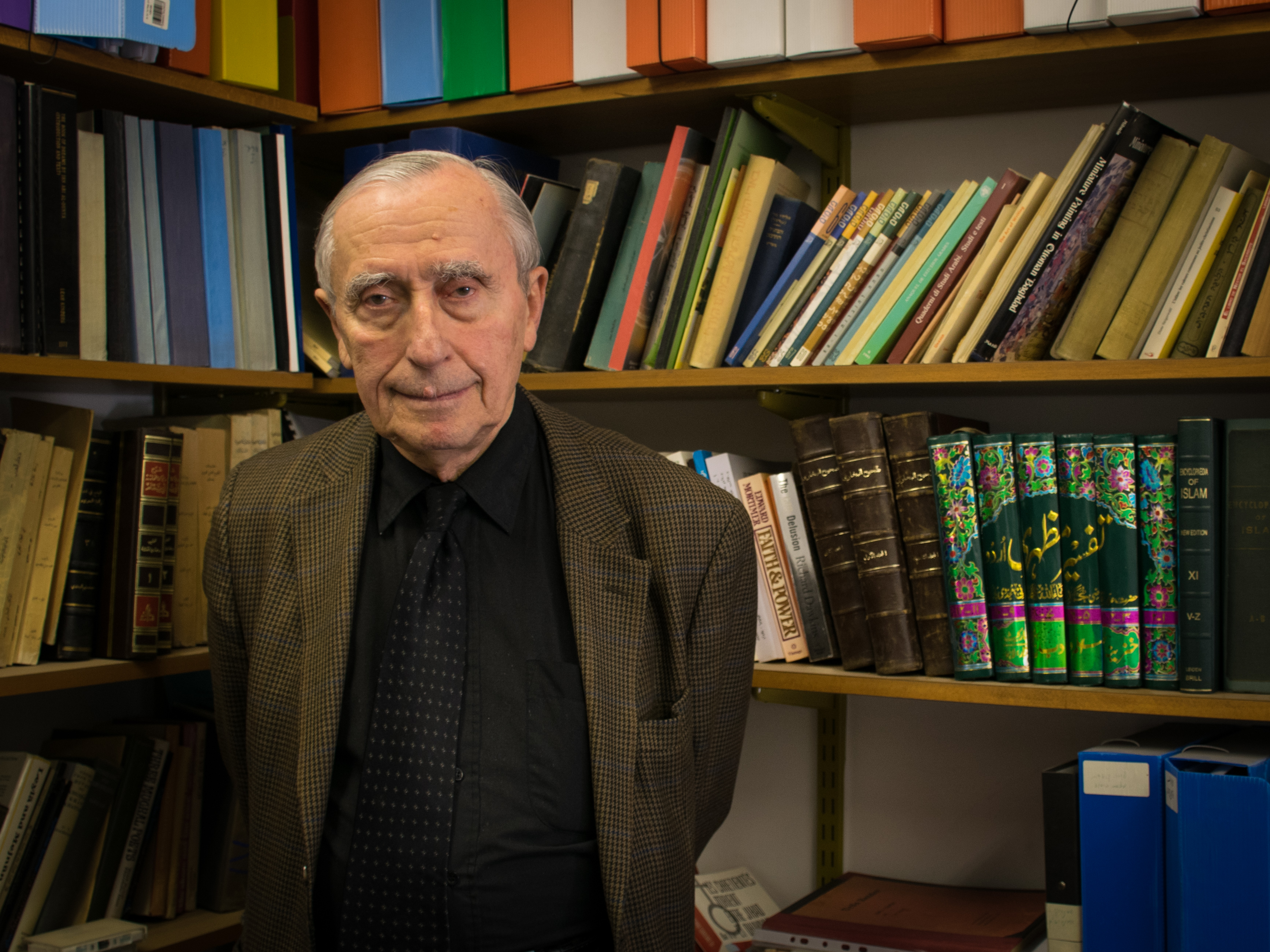
- Born: 1936 (age 89–90); Zákamenné, Czechoslovakia
- Known for: Islamic religious thought, history of Islam in India
- Awards: Landau Prize in the Humanities (2003)

Academic background
- Education: Hebrew University of Jerusalem, McGill University

Academic work
- Discipline: Islamic studies
- Institutions: Hebrew University of Jerusalem
- Notable works: Tolerance and Coercion in Islam: Interfaith Relations in the Muslim Tradition

Yohanan Friedmann (Hebrew: יוחנן פרידמן; born 1936) is an Israeli scholar of Islamic studies.

== Biography ==
Friedmann was born in Zákamenné, Czechoslovakia and immigrated to Israel with his parents in 1949. He attended high school at the Reali School in Haifa (1945-1950). In 1956 he began his undergraduate studies at the Hebrew University of Jerusalem, Department of Arabic Language and Literature, receiving his B.A. in 1959. In 1962 he finished a master's degree in Arabic literature; his thesis was on the Arab poet Al-Ma'arri. After this, Friedman went to McGill University in Montreal to study for his doctorate. He learned Urdu and focused on the history of Islam in India. His dissertation on Muslim religious thinker Sheikh Ahmad Sirhindi was approved in 1966. In the same year, Friedman joined the Hebrew University and was appointed lecturer in Islamic studies.

He is now Max Schloessinger Professor Emeritus of Islamic Studies at the Hebrew University of Jerusalem and, since 1999, a member of the Israel Academy of Sciences and Humanities. He held several offices with the university: Chair of the Institute of Asian Studies and African Studies from 1975 to 1978; Chair of the Graduate School from 1980 to 1983; Dean of Humanities from 1985 to 1988; Chair of the Department of Arabic language and literature from 2002 to 2004. In 2003 he was the Sternberg Distinguished Lecturer. In 2007 he has been elected Chair of the Humanities Division of the Israel Academy of Sciences and Humanities.

In 2002 Friedmann was member at the Institute for Advanced Study in Princeton. In 2003 he received the Landau Prize in the Humanities. Since 1993, he has been the editor of Jerusalem Studies in Arabic and Islam. Friedmann served several times as visiting professor at New York University and the University of Pennsylvania. In 1997 he was scholar in residence with the Rockefeller Foundation.

== Research interests ==
Friedmann's studies center on Islamic religious thought, mainly in the Indian subcontinent. He assays the historical record for evidence of both tolerance and intolerance of other religious faiths in the Islamic tradition in his most recent work, "Tolerance and Coercion in Islam: Interfaith Relations in the Muslim Tradition".

== Works ==
- "Shaykh Ahmad Sirhindi. An outline of his thought and a study of his image in the eyes of posterity." McGill-Queens University Press, 1971. Reprint Oxford University Press, 2000.
- Prophecy Continuous. Aspects of Ahmadi Religious Thought and Its Medieval Background, Berkeley, University of California Press, 1989
- The Naqshbandis and Awrangzeb: A reconsideration in: Naqshbandis: Historical Developments And Present Situation, 1990
- Husain Ahmad Madani in: Dictionnaire biographique des savants et grandes figures du monde musulman périphérique, 1992
- The History of al-Tabari: The Battle of al-Qadisiyyah and the Conquest of Syria and Palestine (The History of Messengers and Kings), 1992
- Jam`iyyat al-`ulama-'i Hind, in: The Oxford Encyclopaedia Of The Modern Islamic World, 1995
- Ahmadiyya, in: The Oxford Encyclopaedia Of The Modern Islamic World, 1995
- The messianic claim of Ghulam Ahmad, in: Messianism, eds. M.R. Cohen and P. Schaefer, Leiden, E.J., 1998
- Classification of unbelievers in Sunni Muslim law and tradition in: Jerusalem Studies in Arabic and Islam, 1998
- Conditions of conversion in early Islam. In: Ritual and Ethics: Patterns of Repentance, eds. A. Destro, 2000
- Dissension in: Encyclopedia of the Qur'an, vol. 1, p. 538-540, 2001
- Ahmadiyya in: Encyclopedia of the Qur'an, vol. 1, p. 50-51, 2001
- Messianismus im Islam in: Religion in Geschichte und Gegenwart, vol. 5, 2003
- Chiliasmus im Islam in: Religion in Geschichte und Gegenwart, vol. 2, 2003
- Ahmadiyya in: Religion in Geschichte und Gegenwart, vol. 1, 2003
- Tolerance and Coercion in Islam: Interfaith Relations in the Muslim Tradition, Cambridge University Press, 2003
