= Námestovo District =

Coordinates: 49°24′23″N 19°29′2″E

- District
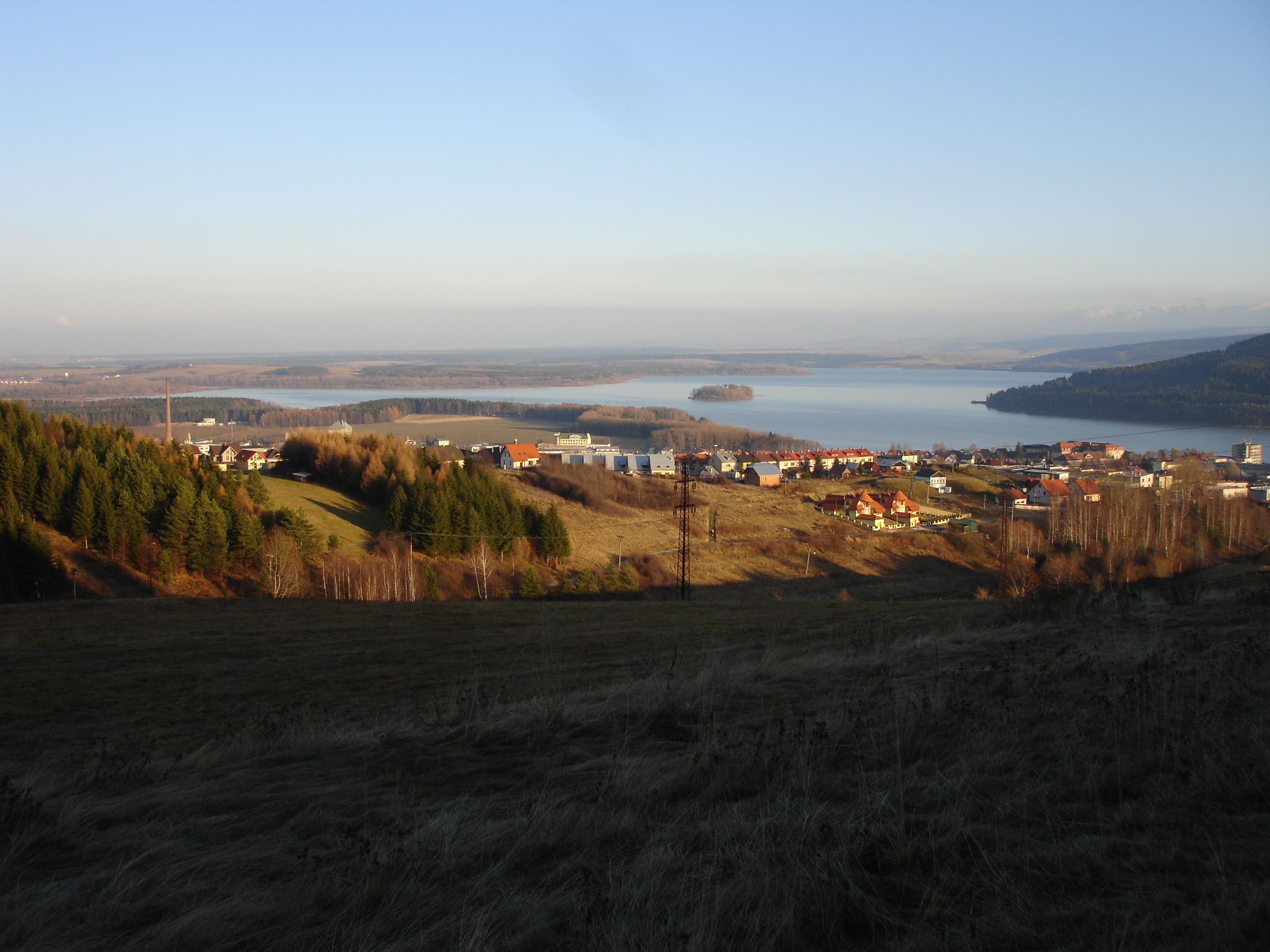
- View of the Námestovo District
- Country: Slovakia
- Region: Žilina Region
- Cultural region: Orava
- Seat: Námestovo

Area
  - Total: 690.45 km^{2} (266.58 sq mi)

Population (2025)
  - Total: 64,935
- Time zone: UTC+1 (CET)
  - Summer (DST): UTC+2 (CEST)
- Telephone prefix: 043
- Vehicle registration plate (until 2022): NO
- Municipalities: 24

Námestovo District (Slovak: okres Námestovo) is a district in the Žilina Region of central Slovakia. Until 1918, the district was part of Árva County, an administrative division of the Kingdom of Hungary.

== Population ==
Historical population
Year	Pop.	±%
1970	40,696	—
1980	45,177	+11.0%
1991	49,598	+9.8%
2001	56,053	+13.0%
2011	59,540	+6.2%
2021	63,200	+6.1%
Source: Statistical Office of the Slovak Republic

Population statistic (10 years)
Year	1995	2005	2015	2025
Count	53,147	57,816	61,305	64,935
Difference		+8.78%	+6.03%	+5.92%

Population statistic
Year	2024	2025
Count	64,651	64,935
Difference		+0.43%

It has a population of 64,935 people (31 December 2025).

=== Ethnicity ===
Census 2021 (1+ %)
Ethnicity	Number	Fraction
Slovak	61,918	95.71%
Not found out	2114	3.26%
Total	64,693	

In year 2021 was 64,693 people by ethnicity 61,918 as Slovak, 2114 as Not found out, 223 as Czech, 143 as Polish, 81 as Other, 37 as Russian, 26 as Hungarian, 24 as Ukrainian, 17 as English, 16 as Italian, 16 as German, 11 as Rusyn, 10 as Romani, 8 as Austrian, 7 as Serbian, 6 as Irish, 6 as Croatian, 5 as Chinese, 5 as Romanian, 5 as Moravian, 4 as Albanian, 3 as Turkish, 2 as Canadian, 2 as Bulgarian, 1 as Vietnamese, 1 as Silesian, 1 as Greek and 1 as French.

Note on population: The difference values of population numbers in the table "Population statistic" and in the sections "Ethnicity" & "Religion" is caused by the use of various statistical methods.

=== Religion ===
Census 2021 (1+ %)
Religion	Number	Fraction
Roman Catholic Church	58,411	92.42%
None	2786	4.41%
Not found out	1109	1.75%
Total	63,200	

In year 2021 was 63,200 people by religion 58,411 from Roman Catholic Church, 2786 from None, 1109 from Not found out, 198 from Evangelical Church, 179 from Greek Catholic Church, 127 from Christian Congregations in Slovakia, 99 from Ad hoc movements, 64 from Other, 48 from Calvinist Church, 43 from Jehovah's Witnesses, 27 from Eastern Orthodox Church, 25 from Buddhism, 19 from Other and not ascertained christian church, 14 from Old Catholic Church, 14 from Paganism and natural spirituality, 13 from Islam, 8 from Seventh-day Adventist Church, 6 from United Methodist Church, 4 from Church of Jesus Christ of Latter-day Saints, 1 from Jewish community, 1 from Hinduism, 1 from Czechoslovak Hussite Church, 1 from Baptists Church, 1 from Bahá'i Community and 1 from Apostolic Church.

== Municipalities ==
Municipality	Area [km^{2}]	Population
Babín	17.39	1,466
Beňadovo	6.69	1,001
Bobrov	25.75	2,131
Breza	22.52	1,617
Hruštín	36.48	3,162
Klin	12.78	2,566
Krušetnica	16.55	1,021
Lokca	24.19	2,569
Lomná	21.55	976
Mútne	64.45	3,259
Námestovo	44.47	7,300
Novoť	37.97	3,822
Oravská Jasenica	23.68	2,005
Oravská Lesná	65.62	3,461
Oravská Polhora	84.51	4,040
Oravské Veselé	41.21	3,102
Rabča	25.15	5,471
Rabčice	22.18	2,121
Sihelné	14.40	2,154
Ťapešovo	6.71	858
Vasiľov	9.14	820
Vavrečka	9.01	1,713
Zákamenné	42.90	5,738
Zubrohlava	15.14	2,562

Population and area values are current for year 2025.

== See also ==
Namestovo church
