= Ťapešovo =

- Municipality
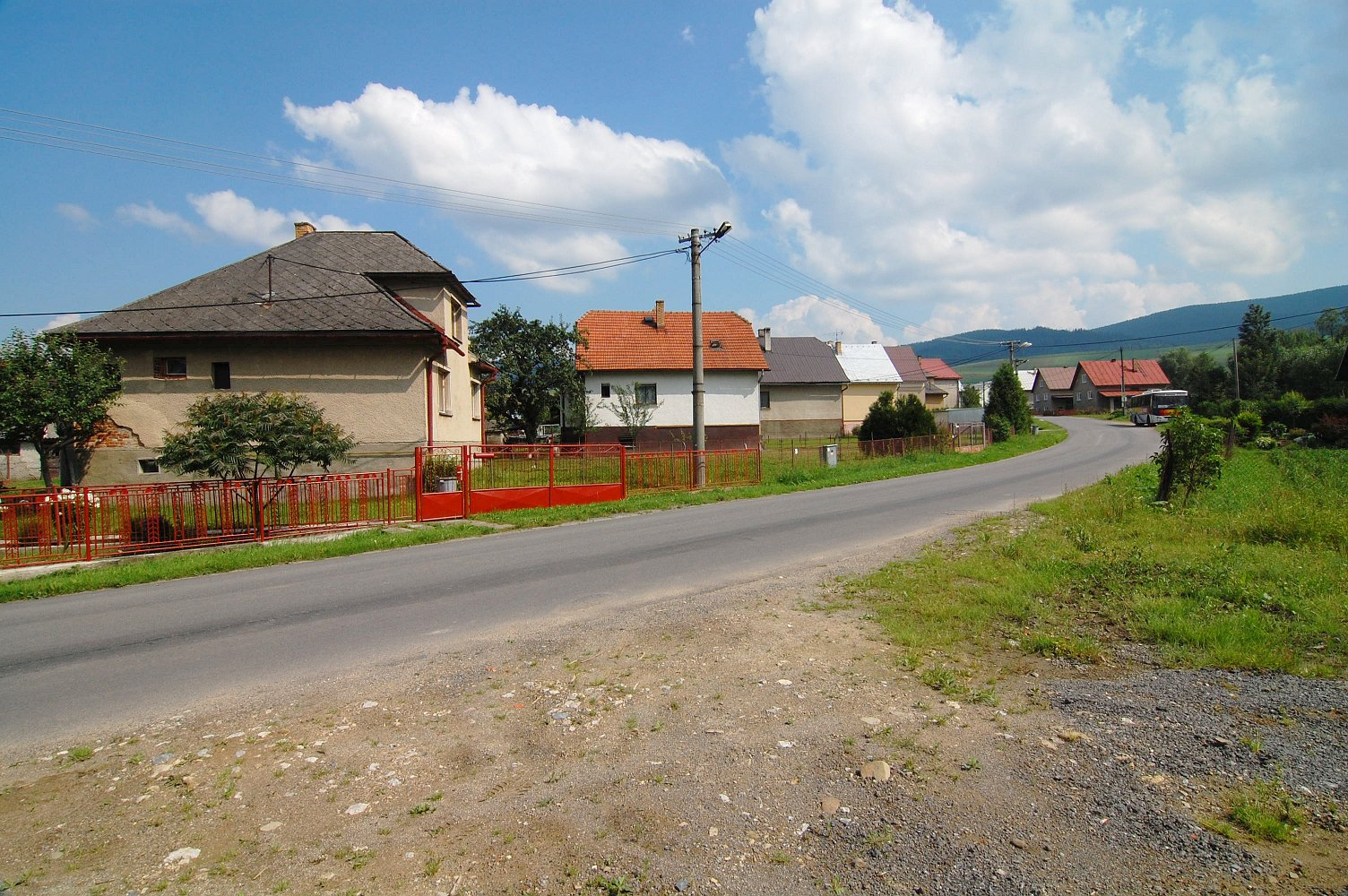

- Flag

- Location of Ťapešovo in the Žilina Region Location of Ťapešovo in Slovakia
- Coordinates: 49.38°N 19.44°E
- Country: Slovakia
- Region: Žilina Region
- District: Námestovo District
- First mentioned: 1580

Area
  - Total: 6.71 km^{2} (2.59 sq mi)
- Elevation: 667 m (2,188 ft)

Population (2025)
  - Total: 858
- Time zone: UTC+1 (CET)
  - Summer (DST): UTC+2 (CEST)
- Postal code: 295 1
- Area code: +421 43
- Vehicle registration plate (until 2022): NO
- Website: www.tapesovo.sk

Ťapešovo (Hungarian: Tyapessó) is municipality (village) near Námestovo, Žilina Region, Slovakia. It is located on the Biela Orava river. The first written mention of Ťapešovo comes from 1580. In 1588 Ťapešovo was under the rule of the Orava Castle.

== Geography ==
The municipality lies at an altitude of 667 metres (2,188 ft) and covers an area of 6.71 km^{2} (2.59 sq mi) (2025).

== Population ==
Population statistic (10 years)
Year	1995	2005	2015	2025
Count	566	628	698	858
Difference		+10.95%	+11.14%	+22.92%

Population statistic
Year	2024	2025
Count	848	858
Difference		+1.17%

It has a population of 858 people (31 December 2025).

=== Ethnicity ===
Census 2021 (1+ %)
Ethnicity	Number	Fraction
Slovak	767	98.84%
Not found out	8	1.03%
Total	776	

In year 2021 was 776 people by ethnicity 767 as Slovak, 8 as Not found out, 3 as Czech, 3 as Russian, 2 as Ukrainian and 1 as Hungarian.

Note on population: The difference values of population numbers in the table "Population statistic" and in the sections "Ethnicity" & "Religion" is caused by the use of various statistical methods.

=== Religion ===
Census 2021 (1+ %)
Religion	Number	Fraction
Roman Catholic Church	712	91.75%
None	45	5.8%
Total	776	

In year 2021 was 776 people by religion 712 from Roman Catholic Church, 45 from None, 6 from Greek Catholic Church, 5 from Not found out, 2 from Calvinist Church, 2 from Eastern Orthodox Church, 2 from Buddhism, 1 from Christian Congregations in Slovakia and 1 from Ad hoc movements.
