= Jerusalem Studies in Arabic and Islam =

Academic journal

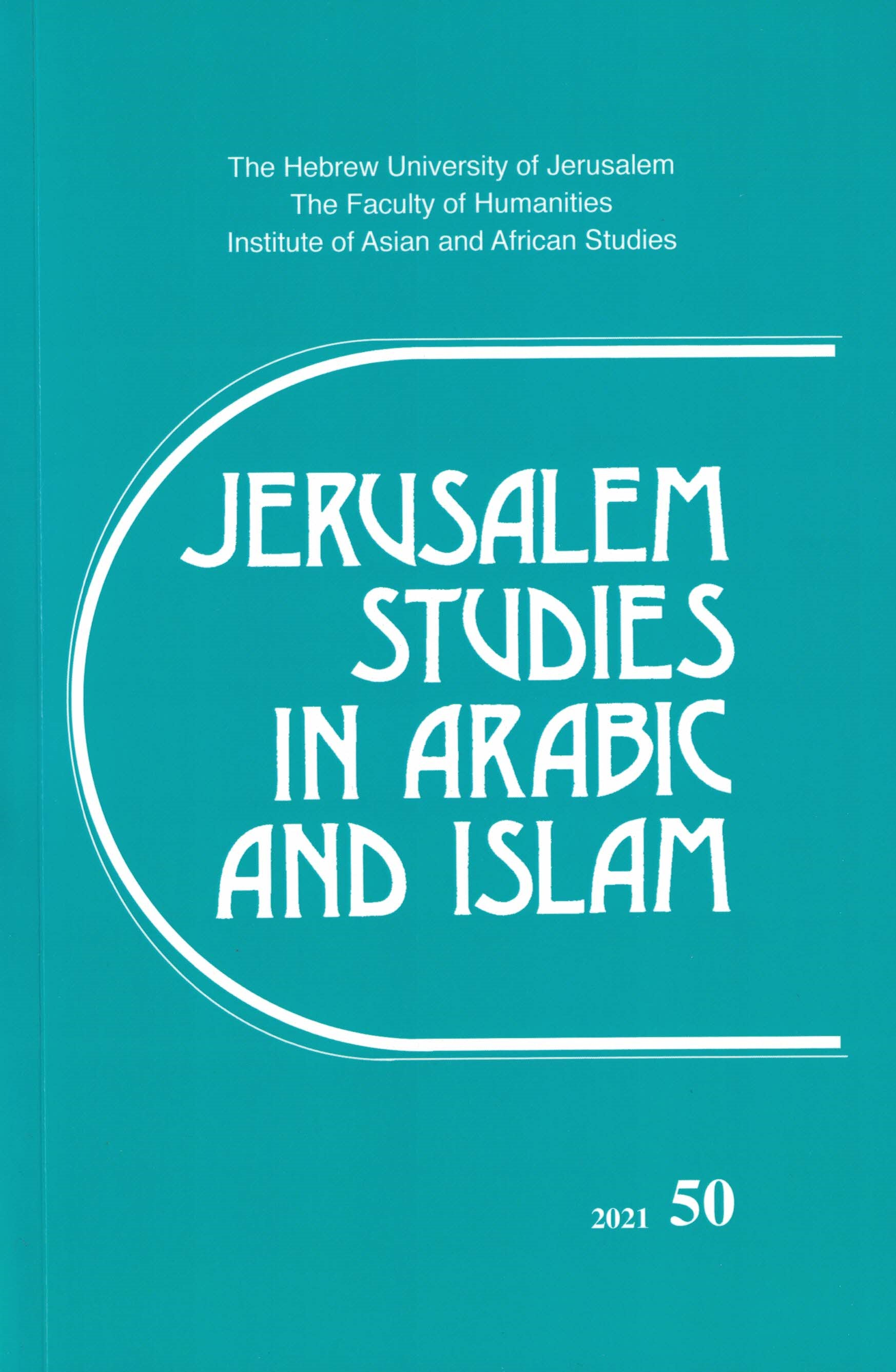
- Discipline: Arabic, Islam
- Language: English
- Edited by: Yohanan Friedmann

Publication details
- History: 1979-present
- Publisher: Hebrew University of Jerusalem (Israel)
- Frequency: Annual

Standard abbreviations
- ISO 4: Jerus. Stud. Arab. Islam

Indexing
- ISSN: 0334-4118
- LCCN: 80646496
- OCLC no.: 5506302

Links
- Journal homepage

Jerusalem Studies in Arabic and Islam is a peer-reviewed academic journal covering the study of classical Islam, Islamic religious thought, Arabic language and literature, the origins of Islamic institutions, and the interaction between Islam and other civilizations. It is published by The Max Schloessinger Memorial Foundation at the Institute of Asian and African Studies (Hebrew University of Jerusalem). The foundation was established from the bequest of Max and Miriam S. Schloessinger to facilitate the publication of Arabic texts as well as studies devoted to Islam, Arabic language and literature, and Middle Eastern history.

The journal was established in 1979 with M. J. Kister as founding editor-in-chief. Since 1993 the editor is Yohanan Friedmann. In 2024, Meir Bar Asher joined Yohanan Friedmann as co-editor. The journal is published annually, but occasionally two volumes are published in the same year.
