= Oravské Veselé =

Village and municipality in Slovakia

- Municipality
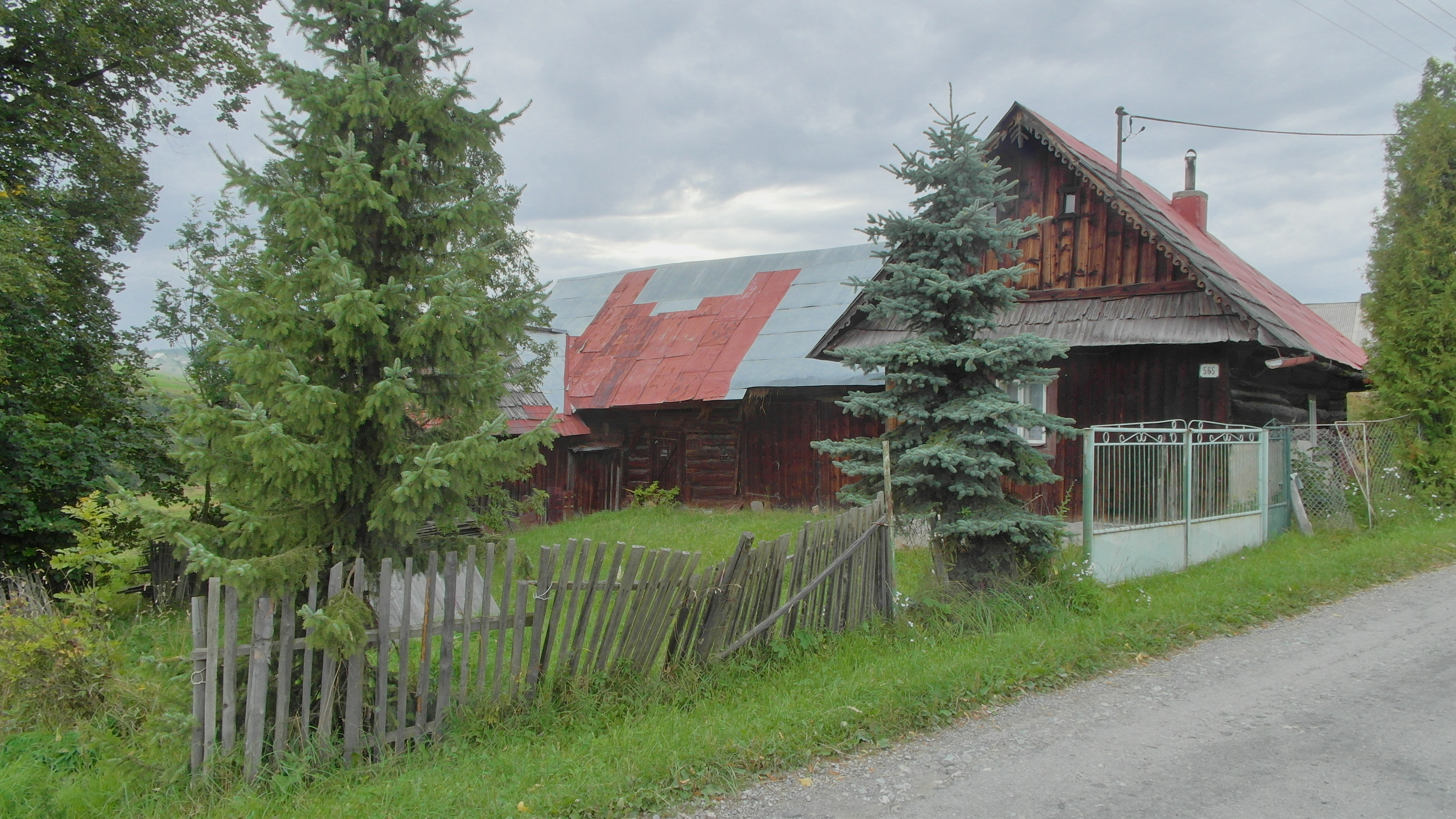

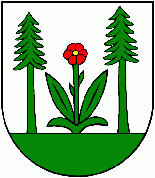
- Flag Coat of arms

- Location of Oravské Veselé in the Žilina Region Location of Oravské Veselé in Slovakia
- Coordinates: 49.47°N 19.38°E
- Country: Slovakia
- Region: Žilina Region
- District: Námestovo District
- First mentioned: 1629

Area
  - Total: 41.21 km^{2} (15.91 sq mi)
- Elevation: 749 m (2,457 ft)

Population (2025)
  - Total: 3,102
- Time zone: UTC+1 (CET)
  - Summer (DST): UTC+2 (CEST)
- Postal code: 296 2
- Area code: +421 43
- Vehicle registration plate (until 2022): NO
- Website: www.oravskevesele.sk

Oravské Veselé is a village and municipality in Námestovo District in the Žilina Region of northern Slovakia.

== History ==
In historical records the village was first mentioned in 1629.

== Geography ==
The municipality lies at an altitude of 749 metres (2,457 ft) and covers an area of 41.21 km^{2} (15.91 sq mi) (2025).

== Population ==
Population statistic (10 years)
| Year | 1995 | 2005 | 2015 | 2025 |
|---|---|---|---|---|
| Count | 2474 | 2756 | 2891 | 3102 |
| Difference | | +11.39% | +4.89% | +7.29% |

Population statistic
| Year | 2024 | 2025 |
|---|---|---|
| Count | 3081 | 3102 |
| Difference | | +0.68% |

It has a population of 3102 people (31 December 2025).

=== Ethnicity ===
Census 2021 (1+ %)
| Ethnicity | Number | Fraction |
|---|---|---|
| Slovak | 2979 | 99.43% |
| Not found out | 89 | 2.97% |
| Total | 2996 | |

In year 2021 was 2996 people by ethnicity 2979 as Slovak, 89 as Not found out, 7 as Czech, 4 as Polish, 3 as Hungarian, 3 as Croatian, 2 as Other, 1 as Ukrainian, 1 as Italian, 1 as Romani, 1 as German, 1 as English and 1 as Albanian.

Note on population: The difference values of population numbers in the table "Population statistic" and in the sections "Ethnicity" & "Religion" is caused by the use of various statistical methods.

=== Religion ===
Census 2021 (1+ %)
| Religion | Number | Fraction |
|---|---|---|
| Roman Catholic Church | 2864 | 95.59% |
| None | 92 | 3.07% |
| Total | 2996 | |

In year 2021 was 2996 people by religion 2864 from Roman Catholic Church, 92 from None, 9 from Not found out, 7 from Christian Congregations in Slovakia, 7 from Evangelical Church, 6 from Greek Catholic Church, 5 from Seventh-day Adventist Church, 2 from Calvinist Church, 2 from Ad hoc movements, 1 from Islam and 1 from Other.
