= Babín =

Village and municipality in Slovakia

- Municipality
- Flag

- Location of Babín in the Žilina Region Location of Babín in Slovakia
- Coordinates: 49.33°N 19.38°E
- Country: Slovakia
- Region: Žilina Region
- District: Námestovo District
- First mentioned: 1564

Area
  - Total: 17.39 km^{2} (6.71 sq mi)
- Elevation: 688 m (2,257 ft)

Population (2025)
  - Total: 1,466
- Time zone: UTC+1 (CET)
  - Summer (DST): UTC+2 (CEST)
- Postal code: 295 2
- Area code: +421 43
- Vehicle registration plate (until 2022): NO
- Website: www.babin.sk

Babín (Hungarian: Babin) is a village and municipality in Námestovo District in the Žilina Region of northern Slovakia.

== History ==
In historical records the village was first mentioned in 1267.

== Geography ==
The municipality lies at an altitude of 688 metres (2,257 ft) and covers an area of 17.39 km^{2} (6.71 sq mi) (2025).

== Population ==
Population statistic (10 years)
| Year | 1995 | 2005 | 2015 | 2025 |
|---|---|---|---|---|
| Count | 1342 | 1414 | 1439 | 1466 |
| Difference | | +5.36% | +1.76% | +1.87% |

Population statistic
| Year | 2024 | 2025 |
|---|---|---|
| Count | 1453 | 1466 |
| Difference | | +0.89% |

It has a population of 1466 people (31 December 2025).

=== Ethnicity ===
Census 2021 (1+ %)
| Ethnicity | Number | Fraction |
|---|---|---|
| Slovak | 1430 | 99.03% |
| Not found out | 22 | 1.52% |
| Total | 1444 | |

In year 2021 was 1444 people by ethnicity 1430 as Slovak, 22 as Not found out, 9 as Polish, 3 as Czech, 1 as German, 1 as Hungarian, 1 as Other and 1 as English.

Note on population: The difference values of population numbers in the table "Population statistic" and in the sections "Ethnicity" & "Religion" is caused by the use of various statistical methods.

=== Religion ===
Census 2021 (1+ %)
| Religion | Number | Fraction |
|---|---|---|
| Roman Catholic Church | 1353 | 93.7% |
| None | 56 | 3.88% |
| Not found out | 21 | 1.45% |
| Total | 1444 | |

In year 2021 was 1444 people by religion 1353 from Roman Catholic Church, 56 from None, 21 from Not found out, 6 from Evangelical Church, 3 from Greek Catholic Church, 2 from Calvinist Church, 1 from Other and not ascertained christian church, 1 from Other and 1 from Church of Jesus Christ of Latter-day Saints.

== Genealogical resources ==
The records for genealogical research are available at the state archive in Žilina branch in Bytča (Slovak: Štátny archív v Žiline so sídlom v Bytči).

- Roman Catholic church records (births/marriages/deaths): 1788–1840, 1871–1922
- Census records 1869 of Babin are not available at the state archive.

== See also ==
- List of municipalities and towns in Slovakia
