= Beňadovo =

- Municipality
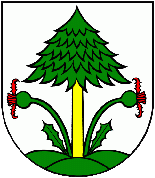
- Flag Coat of arms

- Location of Beňadovo in the Žilina Region Location of Beňadovo in Slovakia
- Coordinates: 49.43°N 19.35°E
- Country: Slovakia
- Region: Žilina Region
- District: Námestovo District
- First mentioned: 1663

Area
  - Total: 6.69 km^{2} (2.58 sq mi)
- Elevation: 763 m (2,503 ft)

Population (2025)
  - Total: 1,001
- Time zone: UTC+1 (CET)
  - Summer (DST): UTC+2 (CEST)
- Postal code: 295 3
- Area code: +421 43
- Vehicle registration plate (until 2022): NO
- Website: www.benadovo.eu

Beňadovo (Hungarian: Benedikó) is a village and municipality in Námestovo District in the Žilina Region of northern Slovakia.

== History ==
In historical records the village was first mentioned in 1663.

== Geography ==
The municipality lies at an altitude of 763 metres (2,503 ft) and covers an area of 6.69 km^{2} (2.58 sq mi) (2025).

== Population ==
Population statistic (10 years)
Year	1995	2005	2015	2025
Count	654	730	824	1001
Difference		+11.62%	+12.87%	+21.48%

Population statistic
Year	2024	2025
Count	973	1001
Difference		+2.87%

It has a population of 1001 people (31 December 2025).

=== Ethnicity ===
Census 2021 (1+ %)
Ethnicity	Number	Fraction
Slovak	933	99.46%
Total	938	

In year 2021 was 938 people by ethnicity 933 as Slovak, 4 as Not found out, 1 as Ukrainian, 1 as Romanian, 1 as Polish and 1 as Hungarian.

Note on population: The difference values of population numbers in the table "Population statistic" and in the sections "Ethnicity" & "Religion" is caused by the use of various statistical methods.

=== Religion ===
Census 2021 (1+ %)
Religion	Number	Fraction
Roman Catholic Church	927	98.83%
Total	938	

In year 2021 was 938 people by religion 927 from Roman Catholic Church, 5 from None, 2 from Not found out, 2 from Evangelical Church, 1 from Calvinist Church and 1 from Eastern Orthodox Church.

== Genealogical resources ==
The records for genealogical research are available at the state archive "Statny Archiv in Bytca, Slovakia"

- Roman Catholic church records (births/marriages/deaths): 1757-1897 (parish B)

== See also ==
- List of municipalities and towns in Slovakia
