= Namestovo church =

Church in Námestovo, Slovakia

Coordinates: 49°24′20″N 19°29′02″E

The Namestovo church is in Námestovo in what is now Slovakia.

The oldest record of a Christian congregation in this location is from 1555; however the church building is believed to have been constructed between 1655 and 1658. This was a chapel which now serves as an entry to the church.

The church's first pastor was Ján Neborovini. Later Štefan Boczko ascended to this post. He was engaged in Piko's rebellion and he fled before punishment to Transylvania. In 1672, for the first time, Namestovo's pastorate was occupied by a Catholic priest, Róbert Chmeľovsky, who was supported by Jesuit priests from Lokca's pastorage. In 1706 a Protestant pastor named Jastrabini Fabianus occupied the church; he was followed by Juraj Pixiades, the last Protestant pastor in Namestovo.

Pastorage in Namestovo has been occupied by Catholic priests from 1711.

During the fire that happened in the 18th century, the whole upper part of Namestovo and the roof of church were burned. In 1775, there was a fire which resulted in the whole upper part of Namestovo and the roof of church were burned; the church was then rebuilt and dedicated to St Simon and St Jude. The church caught fire again in 1877 and was restored in the neo-Romanesque style; another fire broke out in 1906 and again during WWII.

In 1999 the church opened an elementary school dedicated to St Gorazda; the following year the Don Bosco Salesian religious house was created by the church, followed by the Department of Church and Temple Music which trains church organists.

The church is now known as the Roman Catholic Church of St Simon and St Jude in Námestovo.
