= Zubrohlava =

Village in Slovakia

- Municipality
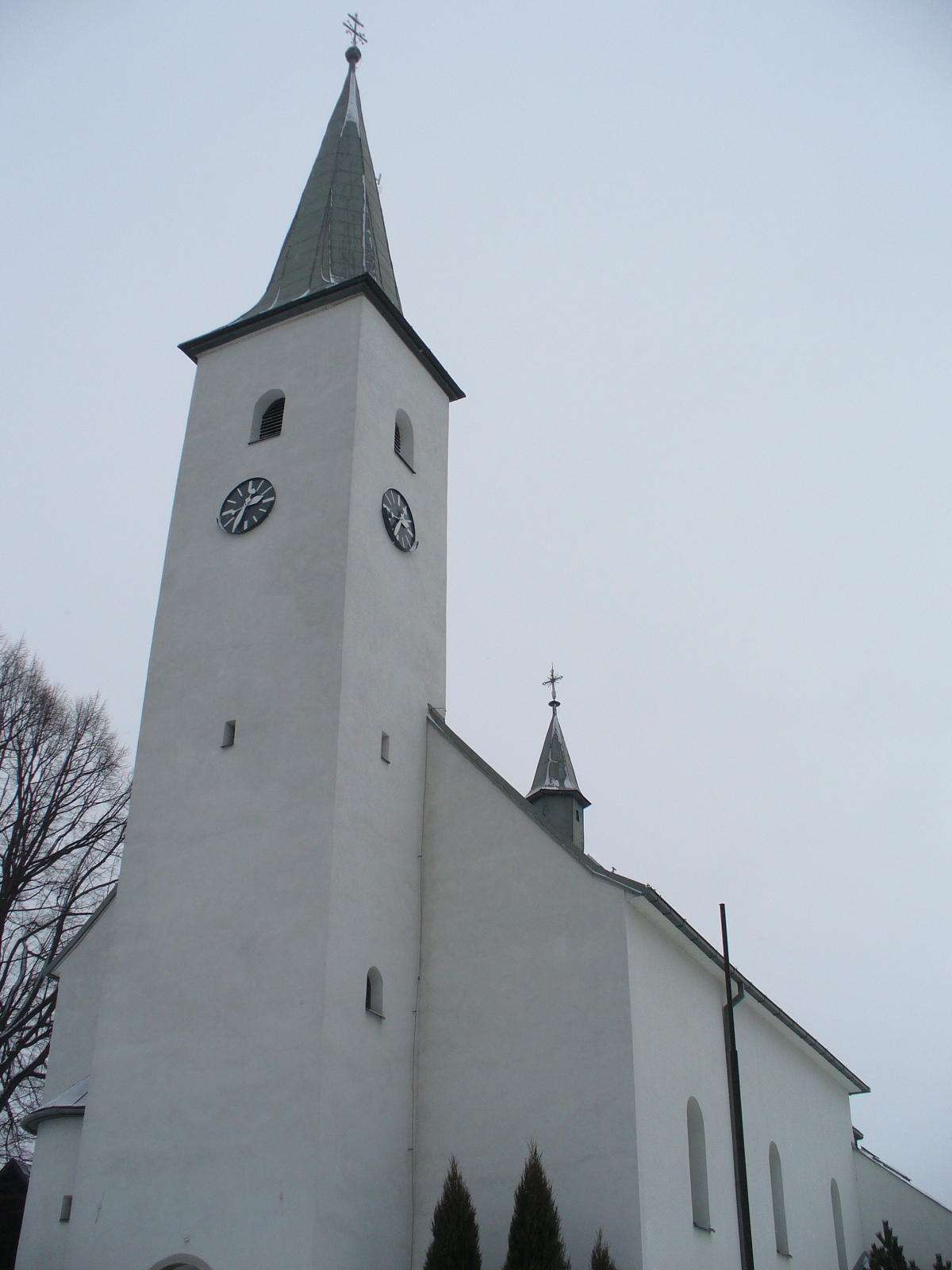

- Flag

- Location of Zubrohlava in the Žilina Region Location of Zubrohlava in Slovakia
- Coordinates: 49.45°N 19.52°E
- Country: Slovakia
- Region: Žilina Region
- District: Námestovo District
- First mentioned: 1588

Area
  - Total: 15.14 km^{2} (5.85 sq mi)
- Elevation: 630 m (2,070 ft)

Population (2025)
  - Total: 2,562
- Time zone: UTC+1 (CET)
  - Summer (DST): UTC+2 (CEST)
- Postal code: 294 3
- Area code: +421 43
- Vehicle registration plate (until 2022): NO
- Website: www.zubrohlava.eu

Zubrohlava is a village and municipality in Námestovo District in the Žilina Region of northern Slovakia.

== History ==
In historical records the village was first mentioned in 1588.

== Geography ==
The municipality lies at an altitude of 630 metres (2,070 ft) and covers an area of 15.14 km^{2} (5.85 sq mi) (2025).

== Population ==
Population statistic (10 years)
| Year | 1995 | 2005 | 2015 | 2025 |
|---|---|---|---|---|
| Count | 1759 | 2067 | 2279 | 2562 |
| Difference | | +17.50% | +10.25% | +12.41% |

Population statistic
| Year | 2024 | 2025 |
|---|---|---|
| Count | 2555 | 2562 |
| Difference | | +0.27% |

It has a population of 2562 people (31 December 2025).

=== Ethnicity ===
Census 2021 (1+ %)
| Ethnicity | Number | Fraction |
|---|---|---|
| Slovak | 2314 | 98.3% |
| Not found out | 46 | 1.95% |
| Total | 2354 | |

In year 2021 was 2354 people by ethnicity 2314 as Slovak, 46 as Not found out, 7 as Czech, 6 as Polish, 3 as Other, 1 as Ukrainian, 1 as Italian, 1 as Serbian, 1 as Russian, 1 as Austrian, 1 as Moravian and 1 as Canadian.

Note on population: The difference values of population numbers in the table "Population statistic" and in the sections "Ethnicity" & "Religion" is caused by the use of various statistical methods.

=== Religion ===
Census 2021 (1+ %)
| Religion | Number | Fraction |
|---|---|---|
| Roman Catholic Church | 2169 | 92.14% |
| None | 116 | 4.93% |
| Not found out | 41 | 1.74% |
| Total | 2354 | |

In year 2021 was 2354 people by religion 2169 from Roman Catholic Church, 116 from None, 41 from Not found out, 7 from Greek Catholic Church, 7 from Evangelical Church, 4 from Other, 3 from Christian Congregations in Slovakia, 2 from Calvinist Church, 2 from Ad hoc movements, 1 from Eastern Orthodox Church, 1 from Church of Jesus Christ of Latter-day Saints and 1 from Buddhism.
