= Oravská Jasenica =

- Municipality
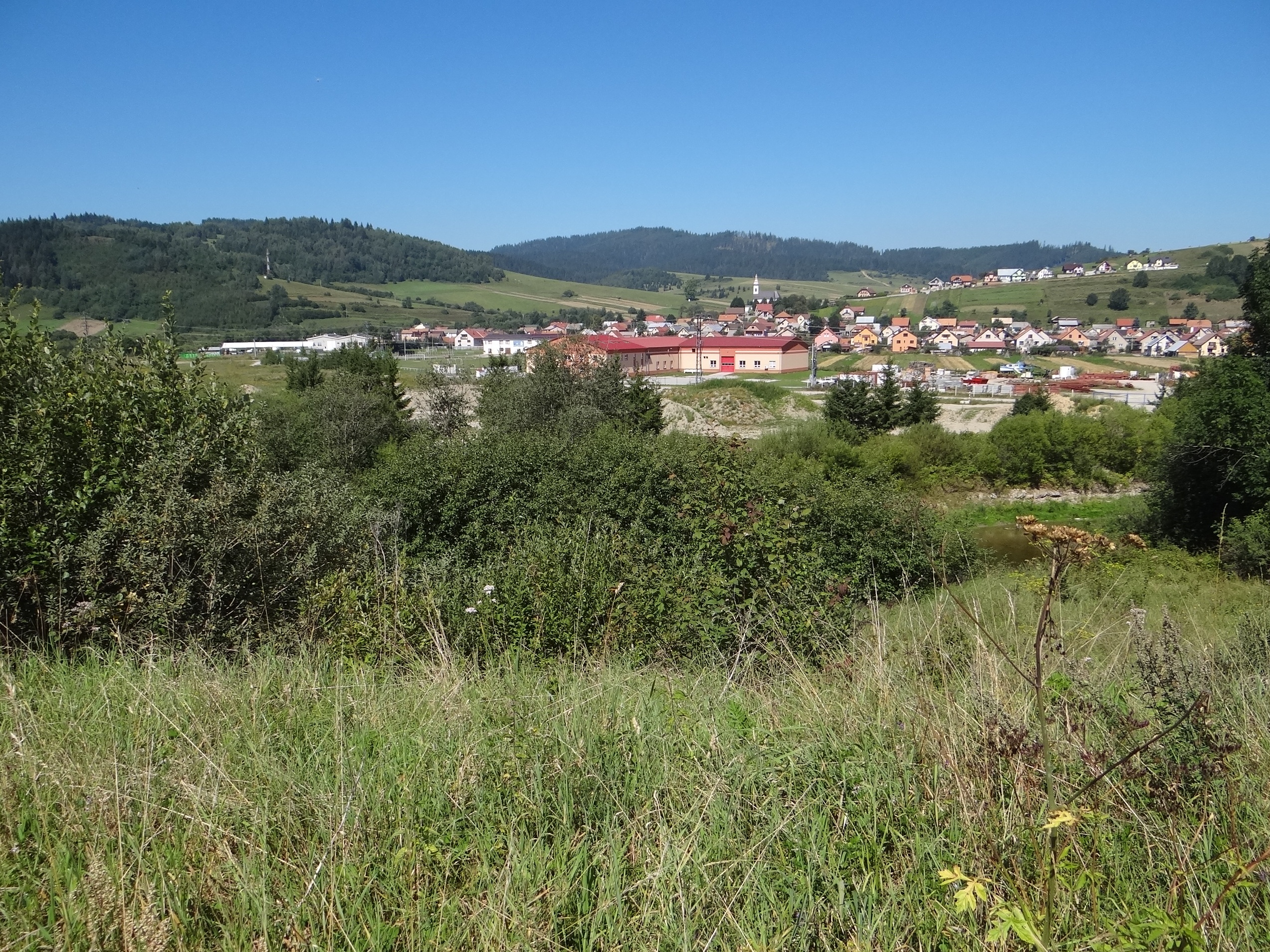

- Flag

- Location of Oravská Jasenica in the Žilina Region Location of Oravská Jasenica in Slovakia
- Coordinates: 49.39°N 19.44°E
- Country: Slovakia
- Region: Žilina Region
- District: Námestovo District
- First mentioned: 1588

Area
  - Total: 23.68 km^{2} (9.14 sq mi)
- Elevation: 624 m (2,047 ft)

Population (2025)
  - Total: 2,005
- Time zone: UTC+1 (CET)
  - Summer (DST): UTC+2 (CEST)
- Postal code: 290 1
- Area code: +421 43
- Vehicle registration plate (until 2022): NO
- Website: www.oravskajasenica.sk

Oravská Jasenica (Hungarian: Jaszenica) is a village and municipality in Námestovo District in the Žilina Region of northern Slovakia.

== History ==
The village was founded in the 1680s. The first written mention of the place under the name Jasenica is dated by 1588. There are later further records under various spellings. The current name Oravská Jasenica was documented in 1949.

== Geography ==
The municipality lies at an altitude of 624 metres (2,047 ft) and covers an area of 23.68 km^{2} (9.14 sq mi) (2025).

== Population ==
Population statistic (10 years)
Year	1995	2005	2015	2025
Count	1411	1596	1812	2005
Difference		+13.11%	+13.53%	+10.65%

Population statistic
Year	2024	2025
Count	1992	2005
Difference		+0.65%

It has a population of 2005 people (31 December 2025).

=== Ethnicity ===
Census 2021 (1+ %)
Ethnicity	Number	Fraction
Slovak	1901	98.9%
Not found out	26	1.35%
Total	1922	

In year 2021 was 1922 people by ethnicity 1901 as Slovak, 26 as Not found out, 3 as Czech, 2 as Polish, 2 as Croatian, 1 as Rusyn, 1 as Russian and 1 as Hungarian.

Note on population: The difference values of population numbers in the table "Population statistic" and in the sections "Ethnicity" & "Religion" is caused by the use of various statistical methods.

=== Religion ===
Census 2021 (1+ %)
Religion	Number	Fraction
Roman Catholic Church	1814	94.38%
None	70	3.64%
Total	1922	

In year 2021 was 1922 people by religion 1814 from Roman Catholic Church, 70 from None, 18 from Not found out, 6 from Evangelical Church, 5 from Greek Catholic Church, 3 from Christian Congregations in Slovakia, 2 from Calvinist Church, 2 from Ad hoc movements, 1 from Paganism and natural spirituality and 1 from Other.
