= Vasiľov =

- Municipality
- Flag

- Location of Vasiľov in the Žilina Region Location of Vasiľov in Slovakia
- Coordinates: 49.35°N 19.38°E
- Country: Slovakia
- Region: Žilina Region
- District: Námestovo District
- First mentioned: 1554

Area
  - Total: 9.14 km^{2} (3.53 sq mi)
- Elevation: 652 m (2,139 ft)

Population (2025)
  - Total: 820
- Time zone: UTC+1 (CET)
  - Summer (DST): UTC+2 (CEST)
- Postal code: 295 1
- Area code: +421 43
- Vehicle registration plate (until 2022): NO
- Website: www.obecvasilov.sk

Vasiľov (Hungarian: Vasziló) is a village and municipality in Námestovo District in the Žilina Region of northern Slovakia.

== History ==
In historical records the village was first mentioned in 1554.

=== World war II ===
In September 1939 citizens of Vasiľov witnessed crossing of German soldiers heading to Poland.

4. April front crossed the village. Early in the morning soviets started bombardment around the village. Later that day soviets soldiers arrived.

== Geography ==
The municipality lies at an altitude of 652 metres (2,139 ft) and covers an area of 9.14 km^{2} (3.53 sq mi) (2025).

== Population ==
Population statistic (10 years)
Year	1995	2005	2015	2025
Count	767	764	819	820
Difference		−0.39%	+7.19%	+0.12%

Population statistic
Year	2024	2025
Count	818	820
Difference		+0.24%

It has a population of 820 people (31 December 2025).

=== Ethnicity ===
Census 2021 (1+ %)
Ethnicity	Number	Fraction
Slovak	826	98.33%
Not found out	20	2.38%
Total	840	

In year 2021 was 840 people by ethnicity 826 as Slovak, 20 as Not found out, 4 as Czech, 2 as Russian, 2 as Hungarian and 2 as Other.

Note on population: The difference values of population numbers in the table "Population statistic" and in the sections "Ethnicity" & "Religion" is caused by the use of various statistical methods.

=== Religion ===
Census 2021 (1+ %)
Religion	Number	Fraction
Roman Catholic Church	785	93.45%
None	33	3.93%
Not found out	13	1.55%
Total	840	

In year 2021 was 840 people by religion 785 from Roman Catholic Church, 33 from None, 13 from Not found out, 4 from Evangelical Church, 2 from Christian Congregations in Slovakia, 1 from Calvinist Church, 1 from Greek Catholic Church and 1 from Buddhism.
