= Sihelné =

- Municipality
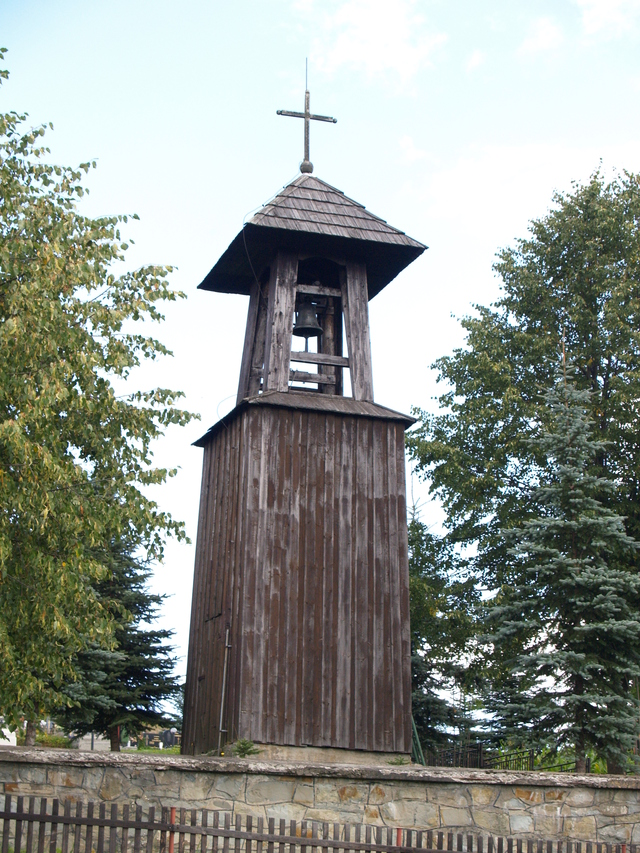

- Flag

- Location of Sihelné in the Žilina Region Location of Sihelné in Slovakia
- Coordinates: 49.50°N 19.43°E
- Country: Slovakia
- Region: Žilina Region
- District: Námestovo District
- First mentioned: 1630

Area
  - Total: 14.40 km^{2} (5.56 sq mi)
- Elevation: 731 m (2,398 ft)

Population (2025)
  - Total: 2,154
- Time zone: UTC+1 (CET)
  - Summer (DST): UTC+2 (CEST)
- Postal code: 294 6
- Area code: +421 43
- Vehicle registration plate (until 2022): NO
- Website: www.obecsihelne.sk

Sihelné (Hungarian: Szihelne) is a village and municipality in Námestovo District in the Žilina Region of northern Slovakia.

== History ==
In historical records the village was first mentioned in 1630.

== Geography ==
The municipality lies at an altitude of 731 metres (2,398 ft) and covers an area of 14.40 km^{2} (5.56 sq mi) (2025).

== Population ==
Population statistic (10 years)
Year	1995	2005	2015	2025
Count	1833	2027	2122	2154
Difference		+10.58%	+4.68%	+1.50%

Population statistic
Year	2024	2025
Count	2166	2154
Difference		−0.55%

It has a population of 2154 people (31 December 2025).

=== Ethnicity ===
Census 2021 (1+ %)
Ethnicity	Number	Fraction
Slovak	2111	96.74%
Not found out	91	4.17%
Total	2182	

In year 2021 was 2182 people by ethnicity 2111 as Slovak, 91 as Not found out, 5 as Polish, 4 as Other, 2 as Czech, 1 as Ukrainian, 1 as Romani and 1 as Romanian.

Note on population: The difference values of population numbers in the table "Population statistic" and in the sections "Ethnicity" & "Religion" is caused by the use of various statistical methods.

=== Religion ===
Census 2021 (1+ %)
Religion	Number	Fraction
Roman Catholic Church	2054	94.13%
Not found out	63	2.89%
None	48	2.2%
Total	2182	

In year 2021 was 2182 people by religion 2054 from Roman Catholic Church, 63 from Not found out, 48 from None, 4 from Christian Congregations in Slovakia, 3 from Calvinist Church, 3 from Greek Catholic Church, 2 from Other, 1 from Eastern Orthodox Church, 1 from Other and not ascertained christian church, 1 from United Methodist Church, 1 from Evangelical Church and 1 from Ad hoc movements.
