= Rabča =

- Municipality
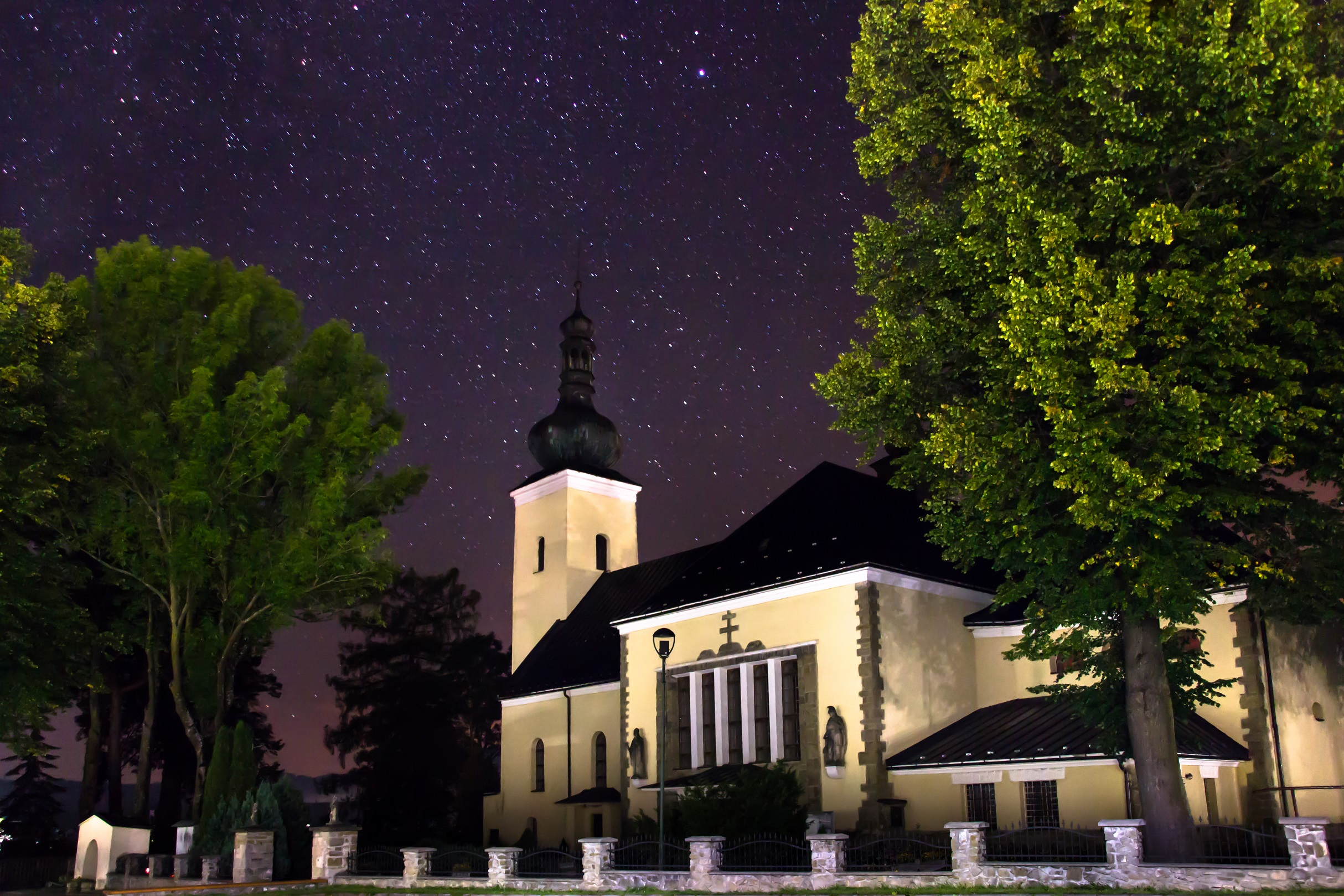

- Flag

- Location of Rabča in the Žilina Region Location of Rabča in Slovakia
- Coordinates: 49.48°N 19.48°E
- Country: Slovakia
- Region: Žilina Region
- District: Námestovo District
- First mentioned: 1564

Government
  - Mayor: Július Piták

Area
  - Total: 25.15 km^{2} (9.71 sq mi)
- Elevation: 642 m (2,106 ft)

Population (2025)
  - Total: 5,471
- Time zone: UTC+1 (CET)
  - Summer (DST): UTC+2 (CEST)
- Postal code: 294 4
- Area code: +421 43
- Vehicle registration plate (until 2022): NO

Rabča is a large village and municipality in Námestovo District in the Žilina Region of northern Slovakia.

== History ==
In historical records the village was first mentioned in 1564 as Rabcza.

== Geography ==
The municipality lies at an altitude of 642 metres (2,106 ft) and covers an area of 25.15 km^{2} (9.71 sq mi) (2025).

== Population ==
Population statistic (10 years)
Year	1995	2005	2015	2025
Count	3947	4386	4890	5471
Difference		+11.12%	+11.49%	+11.88%

Population statistic
Year	2024	2025
Count	5402	5471
Difference		+1.27%

It has a population of 5471 people (31 December 2025).

=== Ethnicity ===
Census 2021 (1+ %)
Ethnicity	Number	Fraction
Slovak	5025	97.78%
Not found out	224	4.35%
Total	5139	

In year 2021 was 5139 people by ethnicity 5025 as Slovak, 224 as Not found out, 15 as Czech, 9 as Other, 9 as English, 5 as Italian, 5 as Polish, 2 as Hungarian, 1 as Rusyn, 1 as Romanian, 1 as Austrian, 1 as Moravian and 1 as Greek.

Note on population: The difference values of population numbers in the table "Population statistic" and in the sections "Ethnicity" & "Religion" is caused by the use of various statistical methods.

=== Religion ===
Census 2021 (1+ %)
Religion	Number	Fraction
Roman Catholic Church	4752	92.47%
None	205	3.99%
Not found out	105	2.04%
Total	5139	

In year 2021 was 5139 people by religion 4752 from Roman Catholic Church, 205 from None, 105 from Not found out, 28 from Greek Catholic Church, 16 from Christian Congregations in Slovakia, 14 from Evangelical Church, 7 from Calvinist Church, 3 from Ad hoc movements, 2 from United Methodist Church, 2 from Church of Jesus Christ of Latter-day Saints, 1 from Eastern Orthodox Church, 1 from Jehovah's Witnesses, 1 from Islam, 1 from Other and 1 from Buddhism.
