= Breza, Slovakia =

Breza
- Municipality
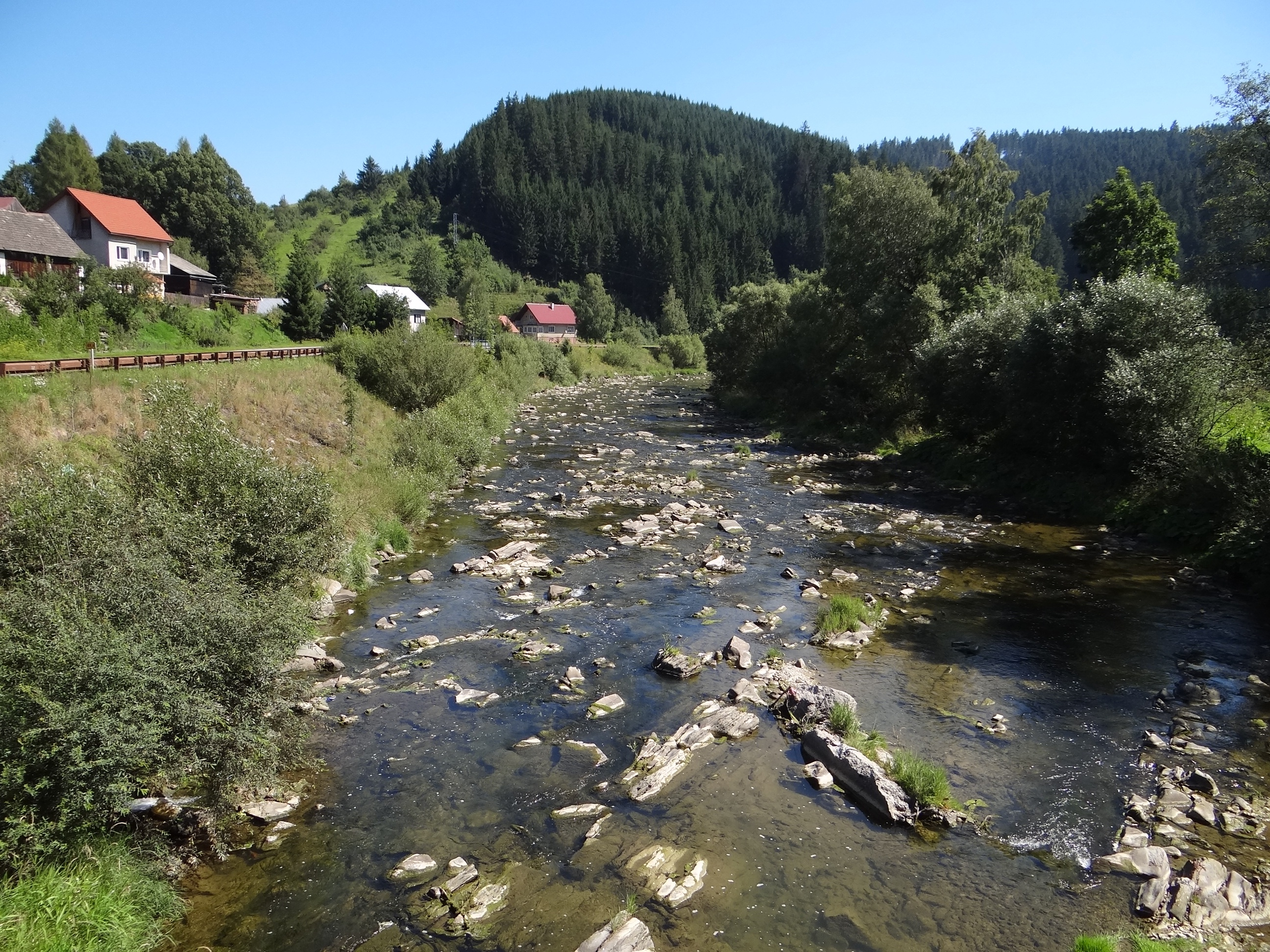

- Flag

- Location of Breza in the Žilina Region Location of Breza in Slovakia
- Coordinates: 49°23′N 19°24′E
- Country: Slovakia
- Region: Žilina Region
- District: Námestovo District
- First mentioned: 1580

Area
  - Total: 22.52 km^{2} (8.70 sq mi)
- Elevation: 657 m (2,156 ft)

Population (2025)
  - Total: 1,617
- Time zone: UTC+1 (CET)
  - Summer (DST): UTC+2 (CEST)
- Postal code: 295 3
- Area code: +421 43
- Vehicle registration plate (until 2022): NO
- Website: www.breza.sk

Breza (Hungarian: Breza) is a village and municipality in Námestovo District in the Žilina Region of northern Slovakia.

== History ==
In historical records the village was first mentioned in 1580.

== Geography ==
The municipality lies at an altitude of 657 metres (2,156 ft) and covers an area of 22.52 km^{2} (8.70 sq mi) (2025).

== Population ==
Population statistic (10 years)
Year	1995	2005	2015	2025
Count	1417	1547	1618	1617
Difference		+9.17%	+4.58%	−0.06%

Population statistic
Year	2024	2025
Count	1639	1617
Difference		−1.34%

It has a population of 1617 people (31 December 2025).

=== Ethnicity ===
Census 2021 (1+ %)
Ethnicity	Number	Fraction
Slovak	1595	98.03%
Not found out	36	2.21%
Total	1627	

In year 2021 was 1627 people by ethnicity 1595 as Slovak, 36 as Not found out, 4 as Czech, 2 as Russian, 1 as Polish, 1 as Hungarian and 1 as Other.

Note on population: The difference values of population numbers in the table "Population statistic" and in the sections "Ethnicity" & "Religion" is caused by the use of various statistical methods.

=== Religion ===
Census 2021 (1+ %)
Religion	Number	Fraction
Roman Catholic Church	1541	94.71%
None	30	1.84%
Not found out	27	1.66%
Total	1627	

In year 2021 was 1627 people by religion 1541 from Roman Catholic Church, 30 from None, 27 from Not found out, 9 from Christian Congregations in Slovakia, 5 from Greek Catholic Church, 5 from Evangelical Church, 4 from Ad hoc movements, 2 from Calvinist Church, 2 from Other, 1 from Eastern Orthodox Church and 1 from Other and not ascertained christian church.
