= Vavrečka =

- Municipality
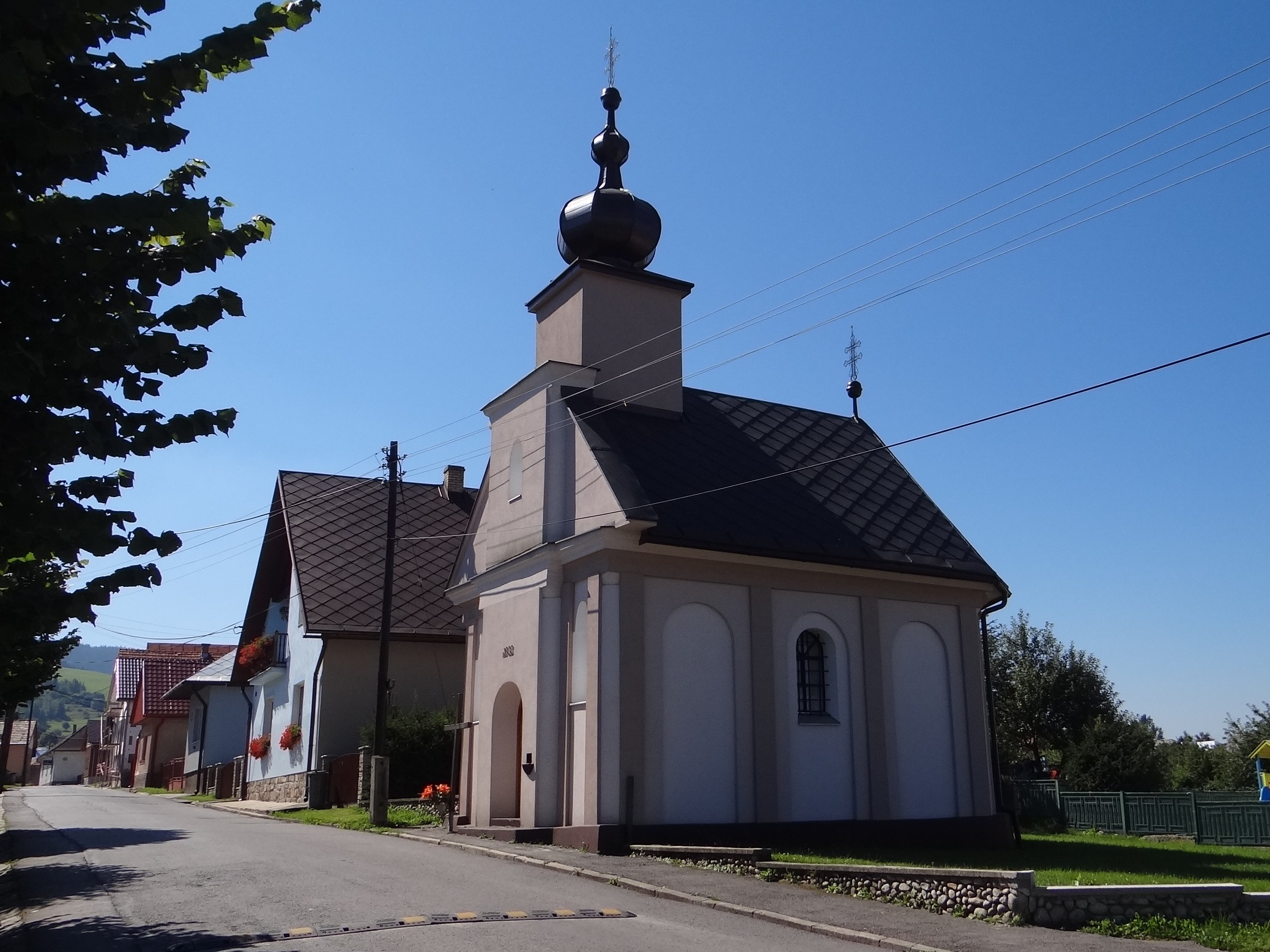

- Flag

- Location of Vavrečka in the Žilina Region Location of Vavrečka in Slovakia
- Coordinates: 49.38°N 19.47°E
- Country: Slovakia
- Region: Žilina Region
- District: Námestovo District
- First mentioned: 1600

Government
  - Mayor: Karol Pjentek (Ind.)

Area
  - Total: 9.01 km^{2} (3.48 sq mi)
- Elevation: 656 m (2,152 ft)

Population (2025)
  - Total: 1,713
- Time zone: UTC+1 (CET)
  - Summer (DST): UTC+2 (CEST)
- Postal code: 0290 1
- Area code: +421 43
- Vehicle registration plate (until 2022): NO
- Website: www.vavrecka.sk

Vavrečka is a village and municipality in Námestovo District in the Žilina Region of northern Slovakia.

== History ==
In historical records the village was first mentioned in 1600.

== Geography ==
The municipality lies at an altitude of 656 metres (2,152 ft) and covers an area of 9.01 km^{2} (3.48 sq mi) (2025).

== Population ==
Population statistic (10 years)
Year	1995	2005	2015	2025
Count	1077	1335	1438	1713
Difference		+23.95%	+7.71%	+19.12%

Population statistic
Year	2024	2025
Count	1707	1713
Difference		+0.35%

It has a population of 1713 people (31 December 2025).

=== Ethnicity ===
Census 2021 (1+%)
Ethnicity	Number	Fraction
Slovak	1584	97.77%
Not found out	32	1.97%
Total	1620	

In year 2021 was 1620 people by ethnicity 1584 as Slovak, 32 as Not found out, 8 as Czech, 5 as Polish, 2 as Ukrainian, 2 as Other, 1 as Russian, 1 as Austrian and 1 as Hungarian.

Note on population: The difference values of population numbers in the table "Population statistic" and in the sections "Ethnicity" & "Religion" is caused by the use of various statistical methods.

=== Religion ===
Census 2021 (1+%)
Religion	Number	Fraction
Roman Catholic Church	1466	90.49%
None	96	5.93%
Not found out	32	1.98%
Total	1620	

In year 2021 was 1620 people by religion 1466 from Roman Catholic Church, 96 from None, 32 from Not found out, 10 from Greek Catholic Church, 4 from Other, 3 from Evangelical Church, 3 from Ad hoc movements, 2 from Eastern Orthodox Church, 2 from Christian Congregations in Slovakia, 1 from Old Catholic Church and 1 from Paganism and natural spirituality.

== Notable people ==
Ján Herkeľ (baptised 22 January 1786 – 1853), attorney and creator of Universalis Lingua Slavica, an early auxiliary language for Slavs, was born in Vavrečka.
