= Mútne =

- Municipality
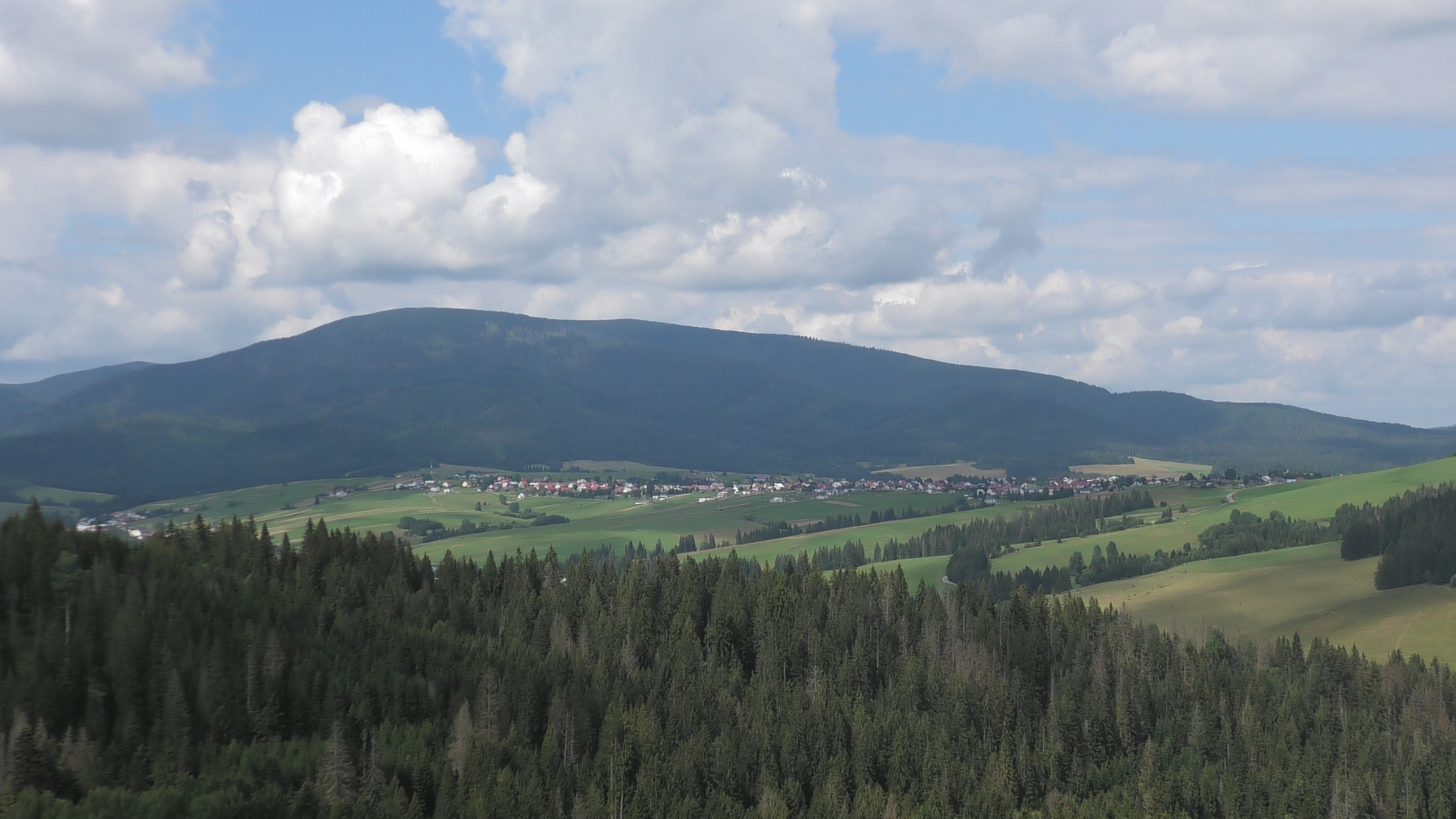

- Flag Coat of arms

- Location of Mútne in the Žilina Region Location of Mútne in Slovakia
- Coordinates: 49.46°N 19.32°E
- Country: Slovakia
- Region: Žilina Region
- District: Námestovo District
- First mentioned: 1659

Area
  - Total: 64.45 km^{2} (24.88 sq mi)
- Elevation: 787 m (2,582 ft)

Population (2025)
  - Total: 3,259
- Time zone: UTC+1 (CET)
  - Summer (DST): UTC+2 (CEST)
- Postal code: 296 3
- Area code: +421 43
- Vehicle registration plate (until 2022): NO
- Website: www.mutne.sk

Mútne (Hungarian: Mutne) is a large village and municipality in Námestovo District in the Žilina Region of northern Slovakia.

== History ==
In historical records the village was first mentioned in 1659.

== Geography ==
The municipality lies at an altitude of 787 metres (2,582 ft) and covers an area of 64.45 km^{2} (24.88 sq mi) (2025).

== Population ==
Population statistic (10 years)
Year	1995	2005	2015	2025
Count	2595	2814	2919	3259
Difference		+8.43%	+3.73%	+11.64%

Population statistic
Year	2024	2025
Count	3249	3259
Difference		+0.30%

It has a population of 3259 people (31 December 2025).

=== Ethnicity ===
Census 2021 (1+ %)
Ethnicity	Number	Fraction
Slovak	3042	99.02%
Not found out	138	4.49%
Total	3072	

In year 2021 was 3072 people by ethnicity 3042 as Slovak, 138 as Not found out, 7 as Czech, 7 as Polish, 2 as Rusyn, 2 as Other, 2 as English, 1 as Vietnamese, 1 as Turkish, 1 as Serbian and 1 as Hungarian.

Note on population: The difference values of population numbers in the table "Population statistic" and in the sections "Ethnicity" & "Religion" is caused by the use of various statistical methods.

=== Religion ===
Census 2021 (1+ %)
Religion	Number	Fraction
Roman Catholic Church	2981	97.04%
None	48	1.56%
Total	3072	

In year 2021 was 3072 people by religion 2981 from Roman Catholic Church, 48 from None, 21 from Not found out, 5 from Greek Catholic Church, 3 from Christian Congregations in Slovakia, 3 from Evangelical Church, 3 from Ad hoc movements, 2 from Islam, 2 from Other, 1 from Eastern Orthodox Church, 1 from Paganism and natural spirituality, 1 from Other and not ascertained christian church and 1 from Buddhism.
