= Krušetnica =

Village and municipality in Slovakia

- Municipality
- Flag

- Location of Krušetnica in the Žilina Region Location of Krušetnica in Slovakia
- Coordinates: 49.37°N 19.35°E
- Country: Slovakia
- Region: Žilina Region
- District: Námestovo District
- First mentioned: 1580

Area
  - Total: 16.55 km^{2} (6.39 sq mi)
- Elevation: 656 m (2,152 ft)

Population (2025)
  - Total: 1,021
- Time zone: UTC+1 (CET)
  - Summer (DST): UTC+2 (CEST)
- Postal code: 295 4
- Area code: +421 43
- Vehicle registration plate (until 2022): NO
- Website: www.krusetnica.sk

Krušetnica (Hungarian: Krusetnica) is a large village and municipality in Námestovo District in the Žilina Region of northern Slovakia.

== History ==
In historical records the village was first mentioned in 1580.

== Geography ==
The municipality lies at an altitude of 656 metres (2,152 ft) and covers an area of 16.55 km^{2} (6.39 sq mi) (2025).

== Population ==
Population statistic (10 years)
Year	1995	2005	2015	2025
Count	874	924	973	1021
Difference		+5.72%	+5.30%	+4.93%

Population statistic
Year	2024	2025
Count	1019	1021
Difference		+0.19%

It has a population of 1021 people (31 December 2025).

=== Ethnicity ===
Census 2021 (1+ %)
Ethnicity	Number	Fraction
Slovak	972	99.89%
Total	973	

In year 2021 was 973 people by ethnicity 972 as Slovak, 7 as Czech, 7 as Not found out, 3 as German, 2 as Other and 1 as Rusyn.

Note on population: The difference values of population numbers in the table "Population statistic" and in the sections "Ethnicity" & "Religion" is caused by the use of various statistical methods.

=== Religion ===
Census 2021 (1+ %)
Religion	Number	Fraction
Roman Catholic Church	918	94.35%
None	39	4.01%
Total	973	

In year 2021 was 973 people by religion 918 from Roman Catholic Church, 39 from None, 4 from Not found out, 4 from Evangelical Church, 4 from Ad hoc movements, 2 from Calvinist Church, 1 from Other and 1 from Greek Catholic Church.
