= Lomná, Námestovo District =

Village and municipality in Slovakia

Lomná
- Municipality
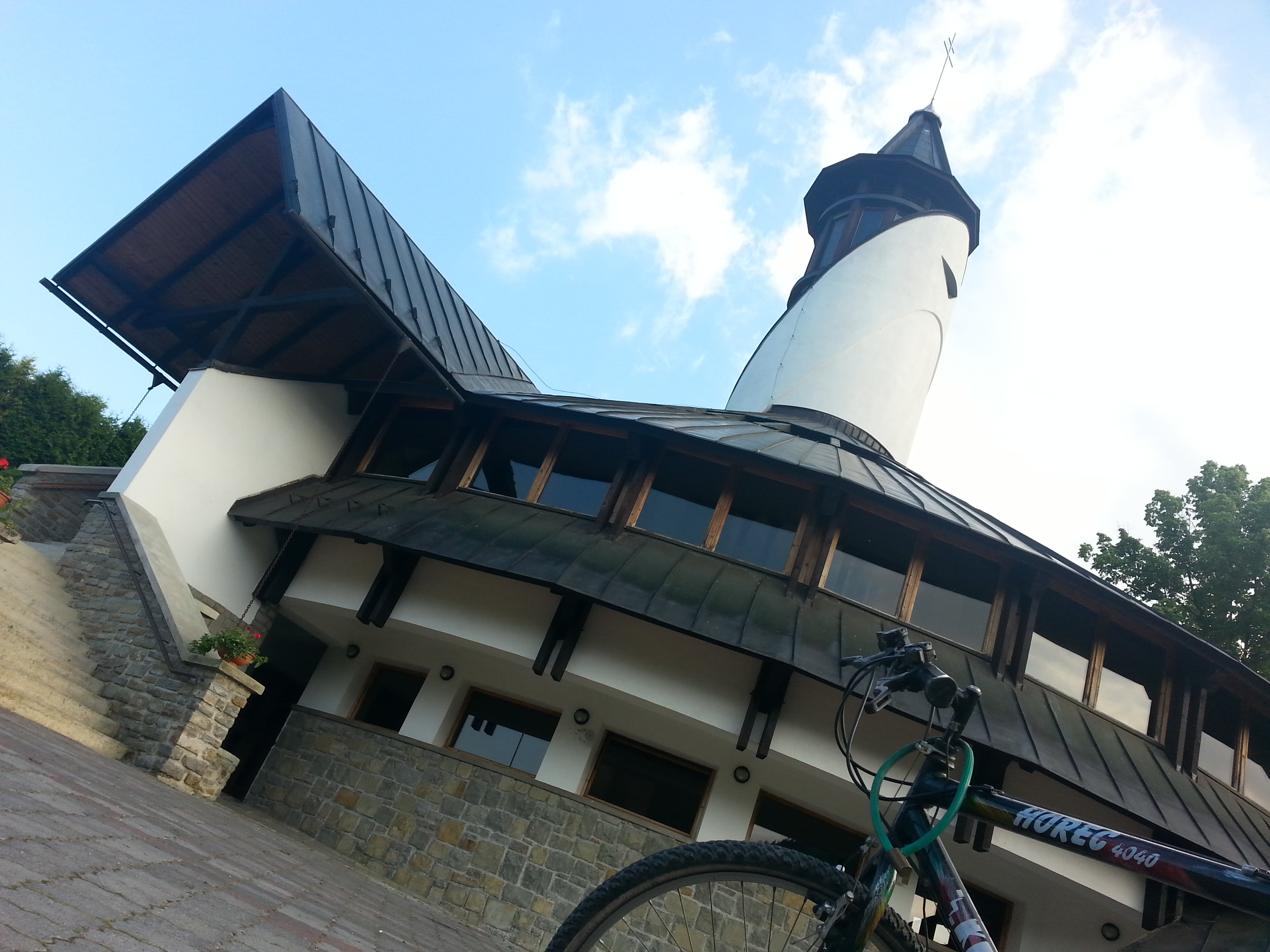

- Flag

- Location of Lomná in the Žilina Region Location of Lomná in Slovakia
- Coordinates: 49°22′N 19°19′E
- Country: Slovakia
- Region: Žilina Region
- District: Námestovo District
- First mentioned: 1609

Area
  - Total: 21.55 km^{2} (8.32 sq mi)
- Elevation: 690 m (2,260 ft)

Population (2025)
  - Total: 976
- Time zone: UTC+1 (CET)
  - Summer (DST): UTC+2 (CEST)
- Postal code: 295 4
- Area code: +421 43
- Vehicle registration plate (until 2022): NO
- Website: www.lomna.sk

Lomná (Hungarian: Lomna) is a large village and municipality in Námestovo District in the Žilina Region of northern Slovakia.

== History ==
In historical records the village was first mentioned in 1609.

== Geography ==
The municipality lies at an altitude of 690 metres (2,260 ft) and covers an area of 21.55 km^{2} (8.32 sq mi) (2025).

== Population ==
Population statistic (10 years)
Year	1995	2005	2015	2025
Count	695	789	897	976
Difference		+13.52%	+13.68%	+8.80%

Population statistic
Year	2024	2025
Count	966	976
Difference		+1.03%

It has a population of 976 people (31 December 2025).

=== Ethnicity ===
Census 2021 (1+ %)
Ethnicity	Number	Fraction
Slovak	926	98.19%
Not found out	17	1.8%
Total	943	

In year 2021 was 943 people by ethnicity 926 as Slovak, 17 as Not found out, 8 as Polish, 7 as Czech, 1 as Ukrainian and 1 as English.

Note on population: The difference values of population numbers in the table "Population statistic" and in the sections "Ethnicity" & "Religion" is caused by the use of various statistical methods.

=== Religion ===
Census 2021 (1+ %)
Religion	Number	Fraction
Roman Catholic Church	910	96.5%
Total	943	

In year 2021 was 943 people by religion 910 from Roman Catholic Church, 9 from Not found out, 9 from None, 7 from Greek Catholic Church, 3 from Other, 2 from Evangelical Church, 2 from Buddhism and 1 from Ad hoc movements.
