= Oravská Lesná =

- Municipality
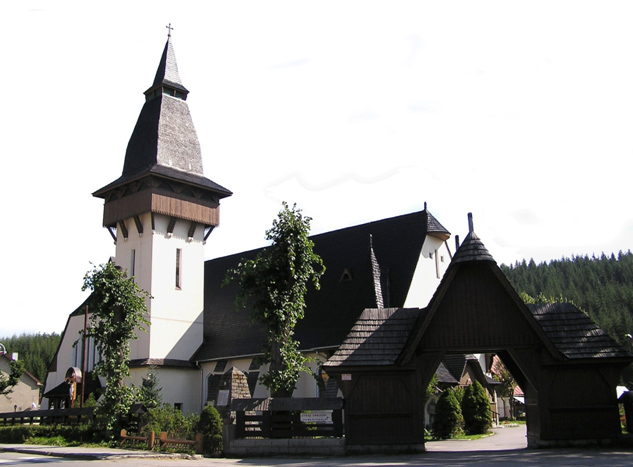
- Church of Saint Anna in the village

- Flag Coat of arms

- Location of Oravská Lesná in the Žilina Region Location of Oravská Lesná in Slovakia
- Coordinates: 49.37°N 19.18°E
- Country: Slovakia
- Region: Žilina Region
- District: Námestovo District
- First mentioned: 1732

Area
  - Total: 65.62 km^{2} (25.34 sq mi)
- Elevation: 858 m (2,815 ft)

Population (2025)
  - Total: 3,461
- Time zone: UTC+1 (CET)
  - Summer (DST): UTC+2 (CEST)
- Postal code: 295 7
- Area code: +421 43
- Vehicle registration plate (until 2022): NO
- Website: oravskalesna.sk

Oravská Lesná (1920-1927 Erdútka, 1927-1945 Erdótka Hungarian: Erdőtka) is a village and municipality in Námestovo District in the Žilina Region of northern Slovakia.

== History ==
In historical records the village was first mentioned in 1731.

== Geography ==
The municipality lies at an altitude of 858 metres (2,815 ft) and covers an area of 65.62 km^{2} (25.34 sq mi) (2025). It borders Gmina Ujsoły, poland and zákameneklin to the north, lomná to the east, zázrivá to the south, and nová bystrica to the west,

== Climate ==
It's the coldest inhabited location in Slovakia.

== Population ==
Population statistic (10 years)
Year	1995	2005	2015	2025
Count	2961	3149	3350	3461
Difference		+6.34%	+6.38%	+3.31%

Population statistic
Year	2024	2025
Count	3449	3461
Difference		+0.34%

It has a population of 3461 people (31 December 2025).

=== Ethnicity ===
Census 2021 (1+ %)
Ethnicity	Number	Fraction
Slovak	3400	98.69%
Not found out	216	6.26%
Total	3445	

In year 2021 was 3445 people by ethnicity 3400 as Slovak, 216 as Not found out, 19 as Czech, 5 as Polish, 4 as Other, 2 as Hungarian, 1 as Ukrainian, 1 as Romani and 1 as Rusyn.

Note on population: The difference values of population numbers in the table "Population statistic" and in the sections "Ethnicity" & "Religion" is caused by the use of various statistical methods.

=== Religion ===
Census 2021 (1+ %)
Religion	Number	Fraction
Roman Catholic Church	3203	92.98%
None	137	3.98%
Not found out	47	1.36%
Total	3445	

In year 2021 was 3445 people by religion 3203 from Roman Catholic Church, 137 from None, 47 from Not found out, 19 from Jehovah's Witnesses, 9 from Christian Congregations in Slovakia, 8 from Evangelical Church, 8 from Ad hoc movements, 7 from Other, 3 from Calvinist Church, 2 from Buddhism, 1 from Paganism and natural spirituality and 1 from Greek Catholic Church.
