= Lokca =

Village and municipality in Slovakia

- Municipality
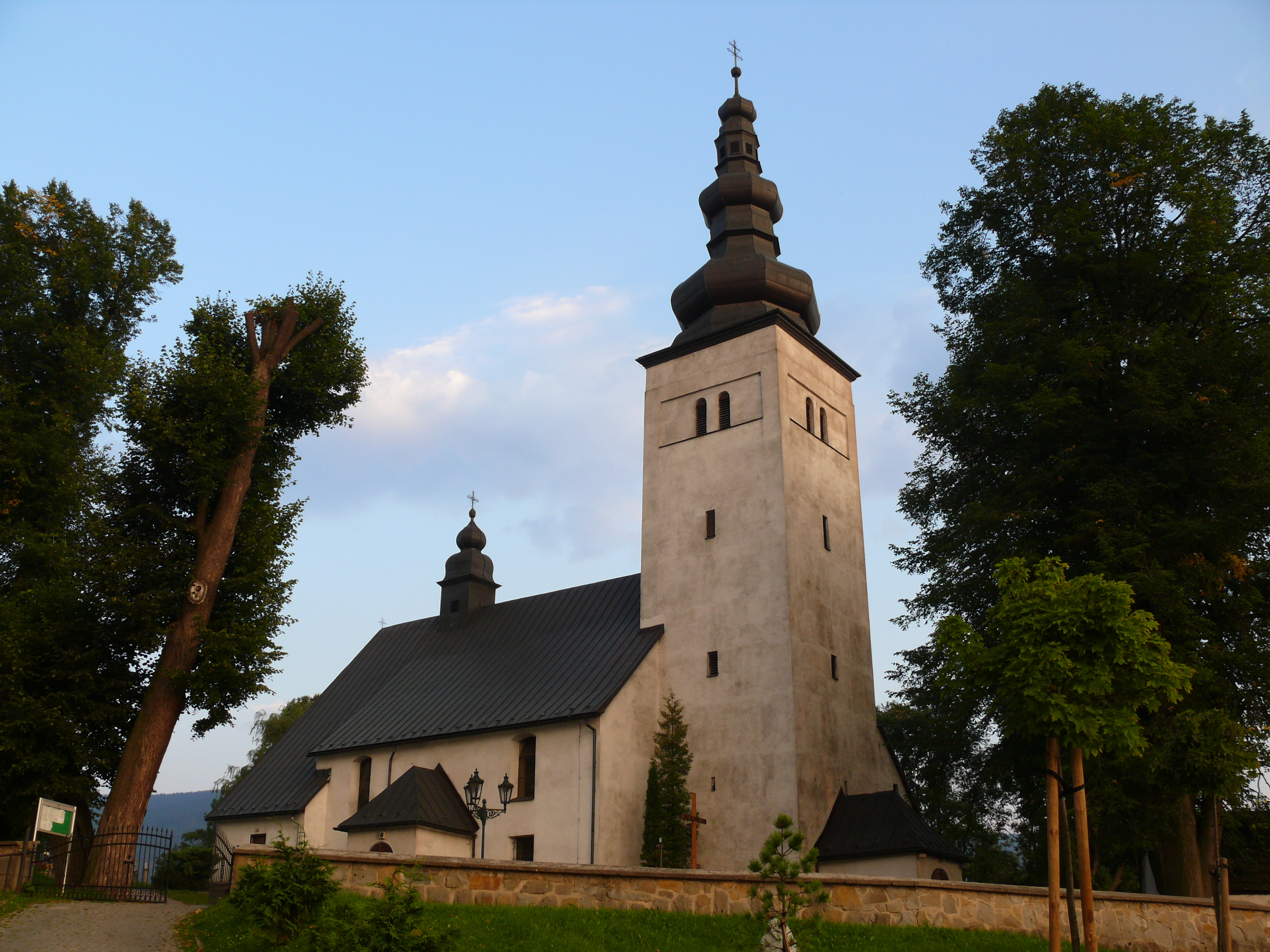

- Flag

- Location of Lokca in the Žilina Region Location of Lokca in Slovakia
- Coordinates: 49.37°N 19.42°E
- Country: Slovakia
- Region: Žilina Region
- District: Námestovo District
- First mentioned: 1554

Area
  - Total: 24.19 km^{2} (9.34 sq mi)
- Elevation: 647 m (2,123 ft)

Population (2025)
  - Total: 2,569
- Time zone: UTC+1 (CET)
  - Summer (DST): UTC+2 (CEST)
- Postal code: 295 1
- Area code: +421 43
- Vehicle registration plate (until 2022): NO
- Website: www.lokca.sk

Lokca is a village and municipality in Námestovo District in the Žilina Region of northern Slovakia.

== History ==
In historical records the village was first mentioned in 1496.

== Geography ==
The municipality lies at an altitude of 647 metres (2,123 ft) and covers an area of 24.19 km^{2} (9.34 sq mi) (2025).

== Population ==
Population statistic (10 years)
Year	1995	2005	2015	2025
Count	2056	2216	2329	2569
Difference		+7.78%	+5.09%	+10.30%

Population statistic
Year	2024	2025
Count	2524	2569
Difference		+1.78%

It has a population of 2569 people (31 December 2025).

=== Ethnicity ===
Census 2021 (1+ %)
Ethnicity	Number	Fraction
Slovak	2344	98.11%
Not found out	44	1.84%
Total	2389	

In year 2021 was 2389 people by ethnicity 2344 as Slovak, 44 as Not found out, 8 as Czech, 7 as Polish, 3 as Italian, 2 as Romani, 2 as Other, 1 as German, 1 as Hungarian and 1 as English.

Note on population: The difference values of population numbers in the table "Population statistic" and in the sections "Ethnicity" & "Religion" is caused by the use of various statistical methods.

=== Religion ===
Census 2021 (1+ %)
Religion	Number	Fraction
Roman Catholic Church	2191	91.71%
None	133	5.57%
Not found out	30	1.26%
Total	2389	

In year 2021 was 2389 people by religion 2191 from Roman Catholic Church, 133 from None, 30 from Not found out, 11 from Evangelical Church, 9 from Greek Catholic Church, 6 from Other, 4 from Other and not ascertained christian church, 2 from Ad hoc movements, 1 from Old Catholic Church, 1 from Calvinist Church and 1 from Jehovah's Witnesses.
