= Novoť =

Municipality of Slovakia

- Municipality
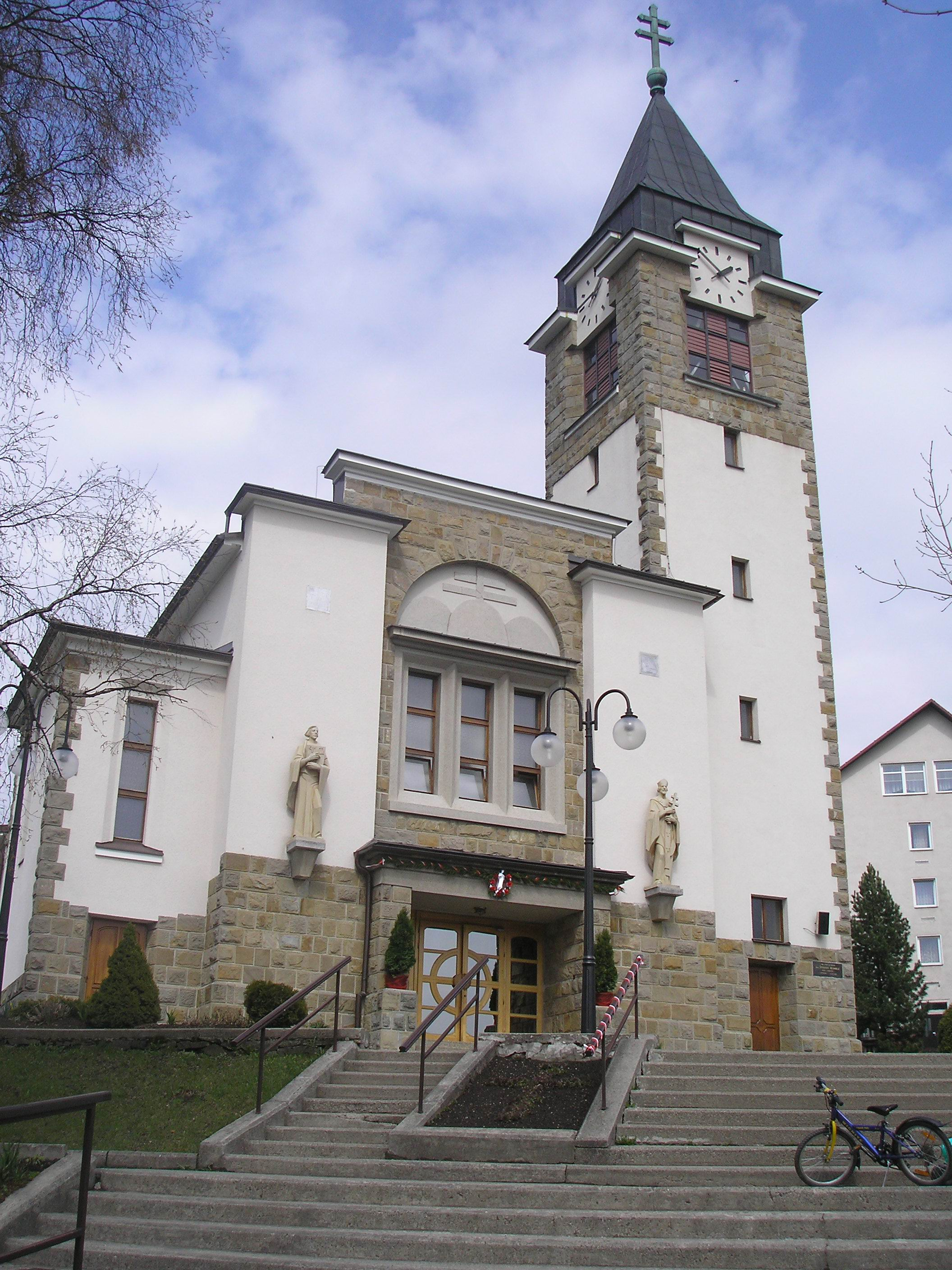

- Flag

- Location of Novoť in the Žilina Region Location of Novoť in Slovakia
- Coordinates: 49.43°N 19.27°E
- Country: Slovakia
- Region: Žilina Region
- District: Námestovo District
- First mentioned: 1691

Area
  - Total: 37.97 km^{2} (14.66 sq mi)
- Elevation: 752 m (2,467 ft)

Population (2025)
  - Total: 3,822
- Time zone: UTC+1 (CET)
  - Summer (DST): UTC+2 (CEST)
- Postal code: 295 5
- Area code: +421 43
- Vehicle registration plate (until 2022): NO
- Website: www.novot.sk

Novoť (Hungarian: Novoty) is a village and municipality in Námestovo District in the Žilina Region of northern Slovakia.

The beginnings of the village date back to 1691, it belonged to the Orava Castle. Initially, the village was known under the name Jurkov. In addition to agriculture, the population in the past was engaged in the cultivation of flax, the production of shingles and canvas, logging and the production of wooden dishes.

Novoť is one of the younger Zamagura municipalities, it was originally named after its founder Jurčákov. Trenches built by the German army before the end of World War II have been preserved in the cadastre of the village. There are 16 chapels, crosses and shrines in the village and in the village. Similar to Oravská Lesná and Zákamenné, the village is inhabited by scattered buildings. The road to Poland passes through the village, which enables the connection of Orava with Poland, Kysuce, but especially with the Czech Republic. The distance from the border to the D3 highway is only 27 km, to the Czech border 41 km. The hiking trail Pilsko-Babia hora passes through the cadastre of the village.

== History ==
In historical records the village was first mentioned in 1691.

== Geography ==
The municipality lies at an altitude of 752 metres (2,467 ft) and covers an area of 37.97 km^{2} (14.66 sq mi) (2025).

== Population ==
Population statistic (10 years)
Year	1995	2005	2015	2025
Count	2830	3203	3520	3822
Difference		+13.18%	+9.89%	+8.57%

Population statistic
Year	2024	2025
Count	3818	3822
Difference		+0.10%

It has a population of 3822 people (31 December 2025).

=== Ethnicity ===
Census 2021 (1+ %)
Ethnicity	Number	Fraction
Slovak	3679	99.08%
Not found out	156	4.2%
Total	3713	

In year 2021 was 3713 people by ethnicity 3679 as Slovak, 156 as Not found out, 21 as Czech, 11 as Polish, 8 as Other, 6 as Ukrainian, 4 as Russian, 2 as Austrian, 2 as German, 2 as Hungarian and 1 as Romanian.

Note on population: The difference values of population numbers in the table "Population statistic" and in the sections "Ethnicity" & "Religion" is caused by the use of various statistical methods.

=== Religion ===
Census 2021 (1+ %)
Religion	Number	Fraction
Roman Catholic Church	3568	96.09%
None	83	2.24%
Total	3713	

In year 2021 was 3713 people by religion 3568 from Roman Catholic Church, 83 from None, 19 from Not found out, 11 from Greek Catholic Church, 11 from Evangelical Church, 10 from Christian Congregations in Slovakia, 3 from Ad hoc movements, 2 from Calvinist Church, 2 from Paganism and natural spirituality, 2 from Other, 1 from Jewish community and 1 from Other and not ascertained christian church.
