= Námestovo =

- Municipality
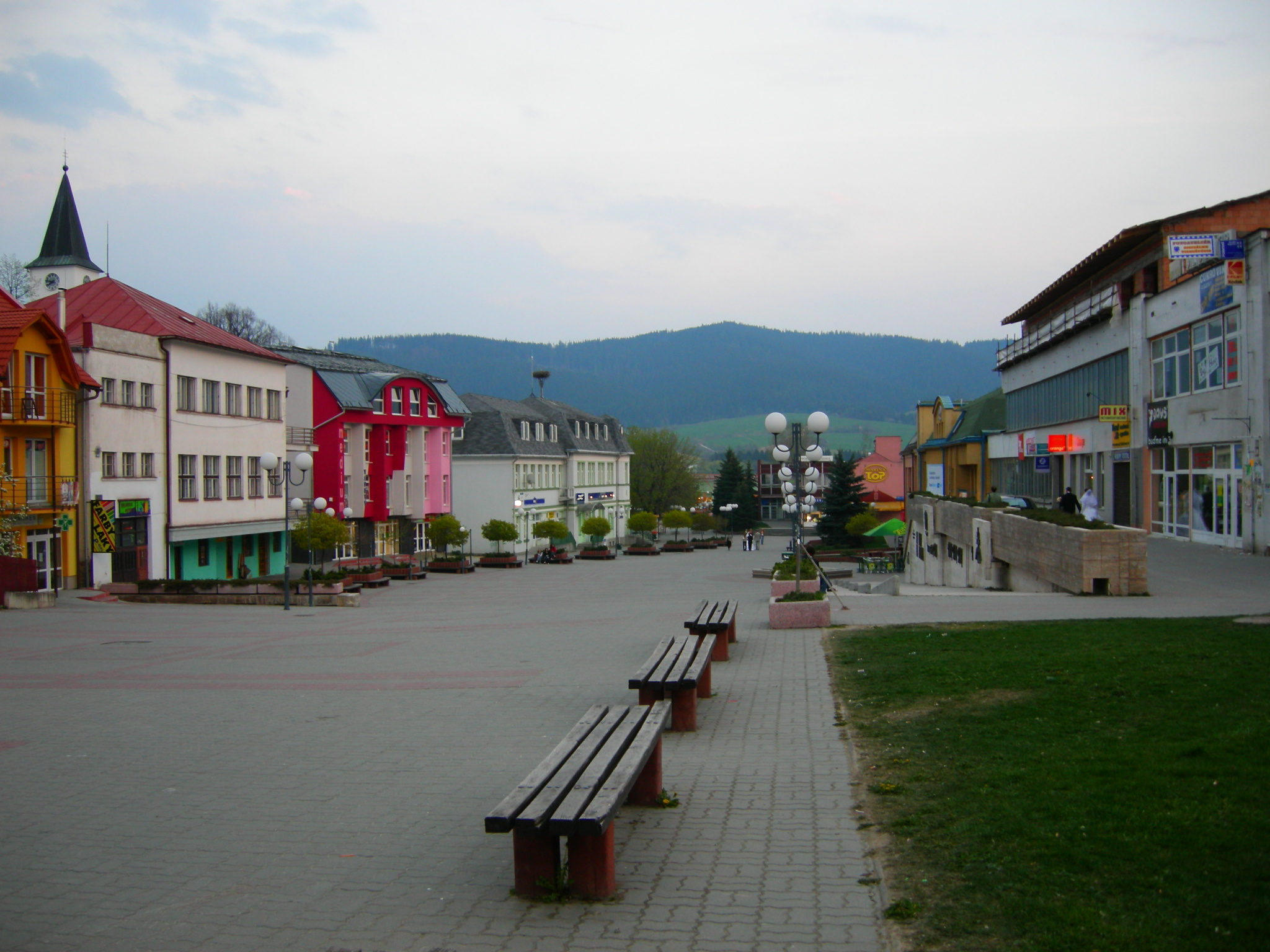

- Flag Coat of arms

- Location of Námestovo in the Žilina Region Location of Námestovo in Slovakia
- Coordinates: 49.40°N 19.48°E
- Country: Slovakia
- Region: Žilina Region
- District: Námestovo District
- First mentioned: 1558

Government
  - Mayor: Ján Kadera

Area
  - Total: 44.47 km^{2} (17.17 sq mi)
- Elevation: 620 m (2,030 ft)

Population (2025)
  - Total: 7,300
- Time zone: UTC+1 (CET)
  - Summer (DST): UTC+2 (CEST)
- Postal code: 290 1
- Area code: +421 43
- Vehicle registration plate (until 2022): NO
- Website: www.namestovo.sk

Námestovo (Hungarian: Námesztó; Polish: Namiestów) is a town in northern Slovakia. It is the capital and largest town of Námestovo District in the Žilina Region. As of 2018 its population was 7,827.

== Etymology ==
The name is derived from a word námesta (a representative, a deputy; like modern Slovak námestník or Czech náměstek) referring to a representative of Vlach settlers whose seat was in Námestovo. Alternatively, it could be derived from a personal name Namest (a less probable theory).

== Geography ==
The municipality lies at an altitude of 620 metres (2,030 ft) and covers an area of 44.47 km^{2} (17.17 sq mi) (2025).

The town is located under the Orava Highlands at the shores of the Orava reservoir, not far from the Polish border, around 15 km (9.32 mi) from Tvrdošín and 30 km (18.64 mi) from Dolný Kubín.

== History ==
The town was mentioned in the 16th century, when the massive colonisation of Orava took place. It was growing quickly, thanks to its favourable location on the trade route to Poland. The town was burned down at the end of World War II. The construction of the Orava reservoir affected the way of life in the town, as two-thirds of the town were inundated, including the town centre. Boom of the industry and the following apartment construction in the 1970s contributed to the growth of the town.

== Population ==
Population statistic (10 years)
Year	1995	2005	2015	2025
Count	7952	8094	7908	7300
Difference		+1.78%	−2.29%	−7.68%

Population statistic
Year	2024	2025
Count	7355	7300
Difference		−0.74%

It has a population of 7300 people (31 December 2025).

=== Ethnicity ===
Census 2021 (1+ %)
Ethnicity	Number	Fraction
Slovak	7272	94.17%
Not found out	438	5.67%
Total	7722	

In year 2021 was 7722 people by ethnicity 7272 as Slovak, 438 as Not found out, 49 as Czech, 21 as Polish, 15 as Other, 10 as Russian, 5 as Chinese, 5 as Ukrainian, 5 as Rusyn, 4 as Irish, 3 as Italian, 2 as Turkish, 2 as Romani, 2 as German, 2 as Moravian, 2 as Hungarian, 2 as Bulgarian, 1 as Serbian, 1 as Silesian, 1 as Romanian, 1 as Austrian, 1 as Canadian, 1 as French, 1 as English and 1 as Albanian.

Note on population: The difference values of population numbers in the table "Population statistic" and in the sections "Ethnicity" & "Religion" is caused by the use of various statistical methods.

=== Religion ===
Census 2021 (1+ %)
Religion	Number	Fraction
Roman Catholic Church	6250	80.94%
None	877	11.36%
Not found out	396	5.13%
Total	7722	

In year 2021 was 7722 people by religion 6250 from Roman Catholic Church, 877 from None, 396 from Not found out, 47 from Evangelical Church, 31 from Greek Catholic Church, 30 from Ad hoc movements, 18 from Christian Congregations in Slovakia, 17 from Other, 14 from Jehovah's Witnesses, 8 from Eastern Orthodox Church, 7 from Other and not ascertained christian church, 7 from Buddhism, 6 from Paganism and natural spirituality, 5 from Islam, 4 from Calvinist Church, 2 from United Methodist Church, 2 from Seventh-day Adventist Church and 1 from Czechoslovak Hussite Church. According to the 2001 census, the town had 8,135 inhabitants. 98.65% of inhabitants were Slovaks and 0.65% Czechs. The religious makeup was 92.12% Roman Catholics, 4.95% people with no religious affiliation and 0.84% Lutherans.Gallery

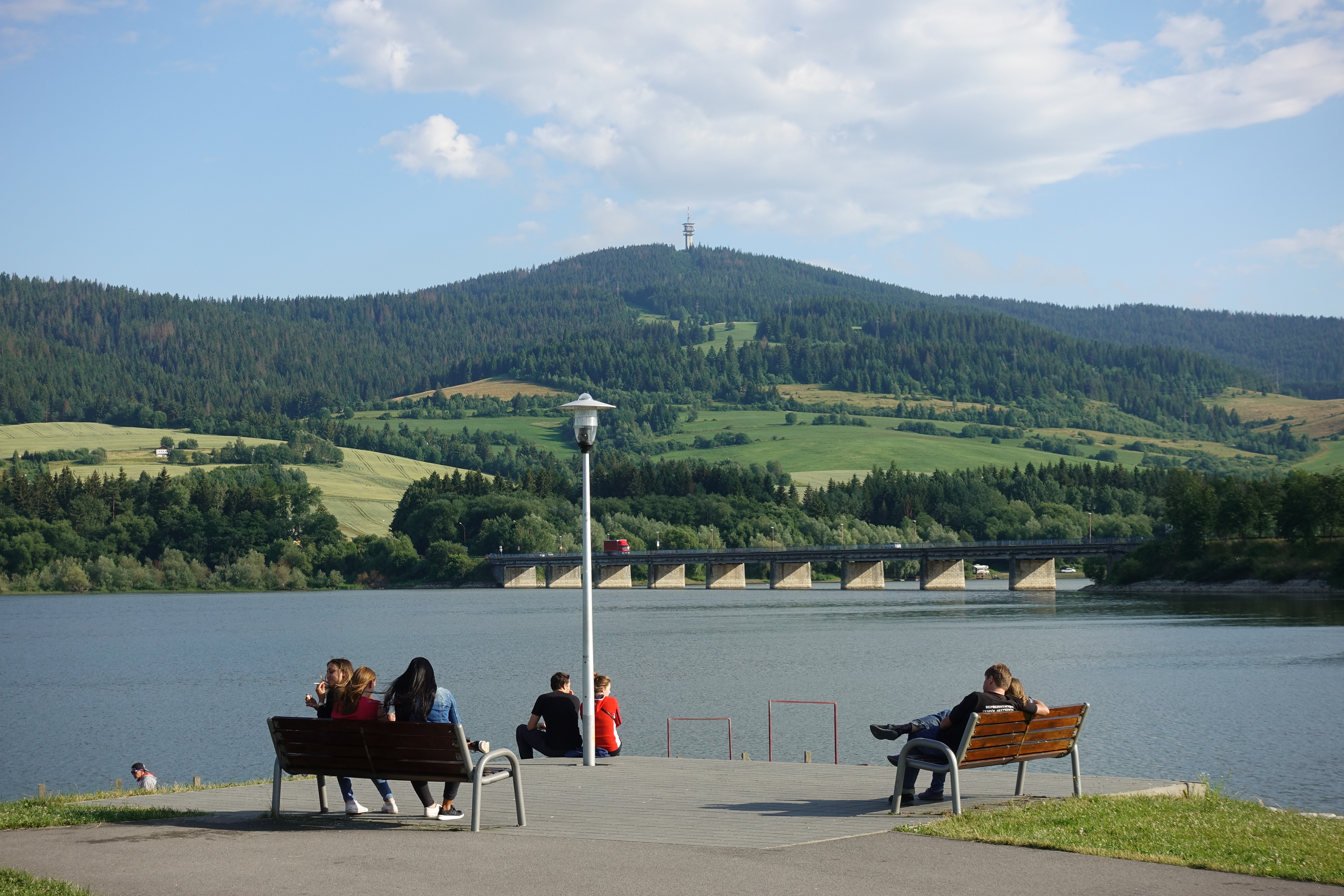
Summer afternoon at Orava Reservoir

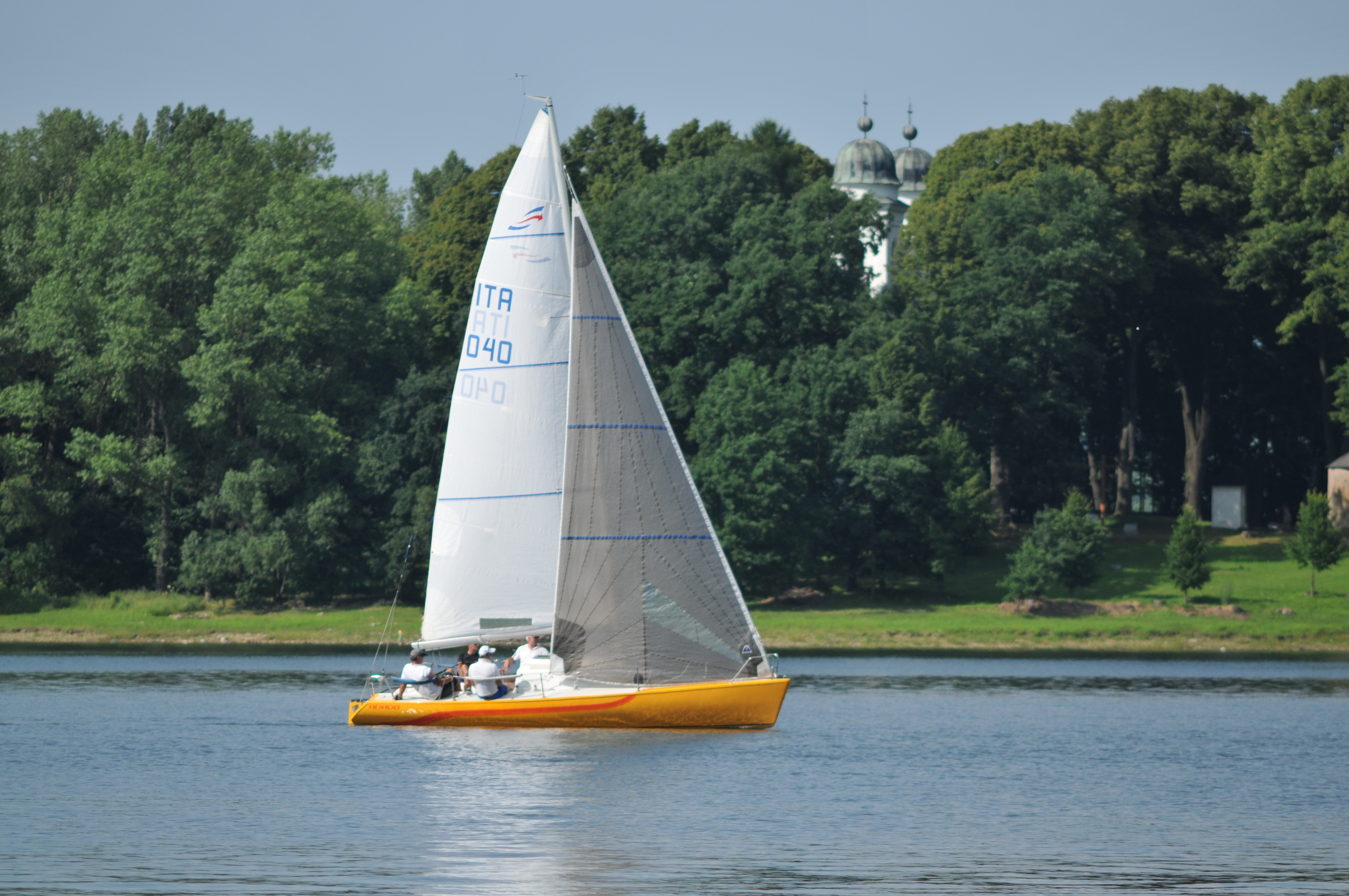
A sailboat on the Orava Reservoir

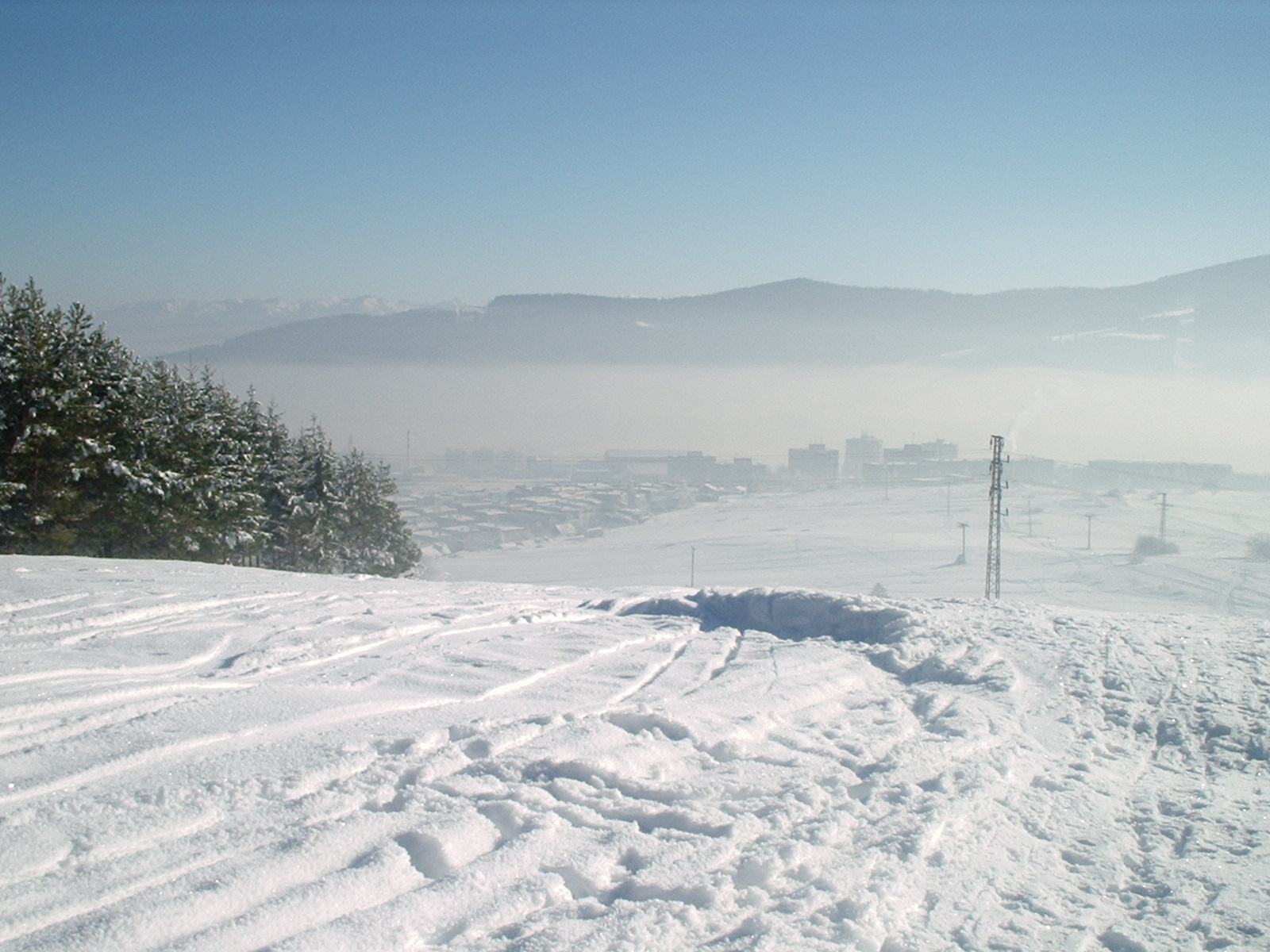
Námestovo in winter

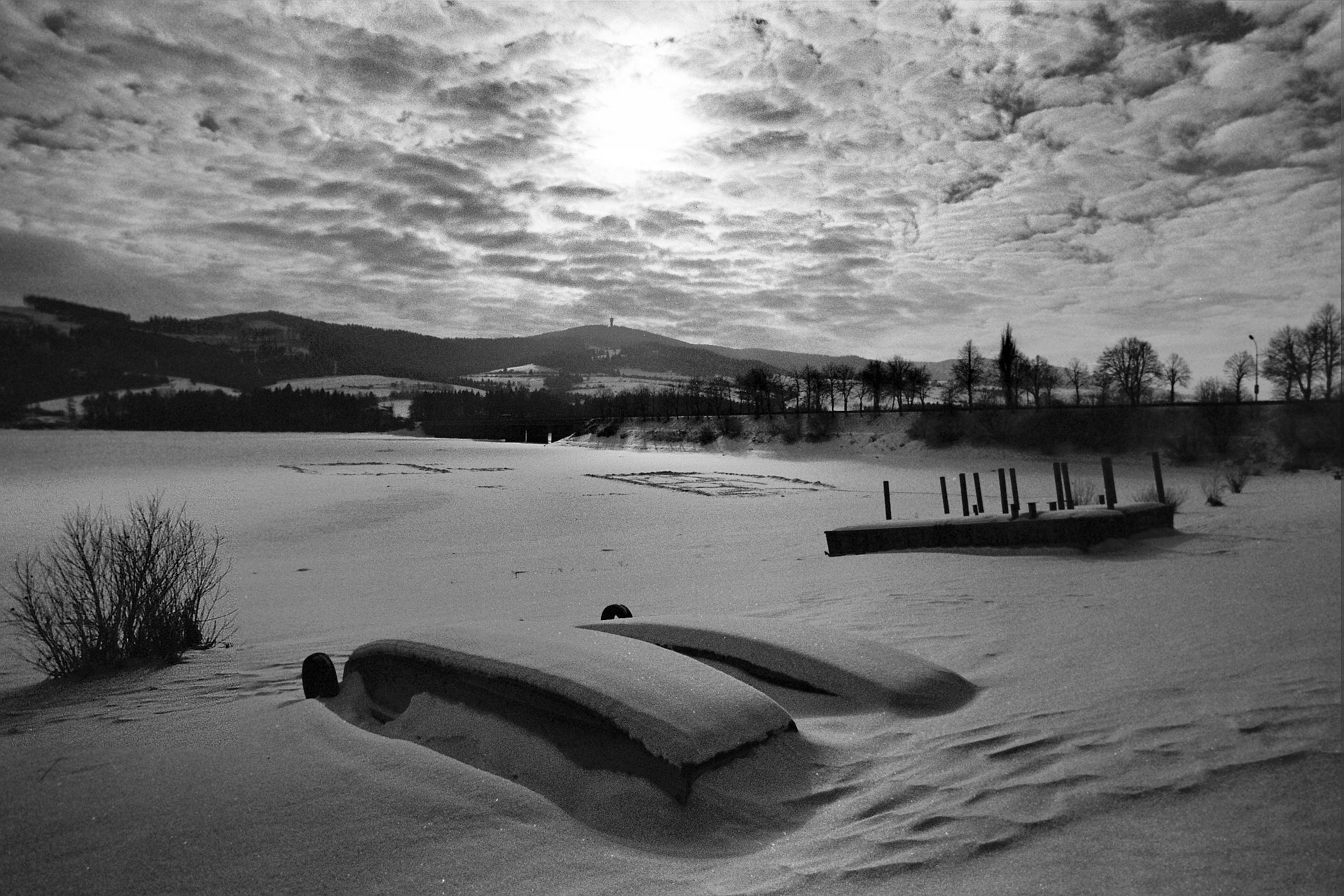
Winter on the bank of Orava Reservoir

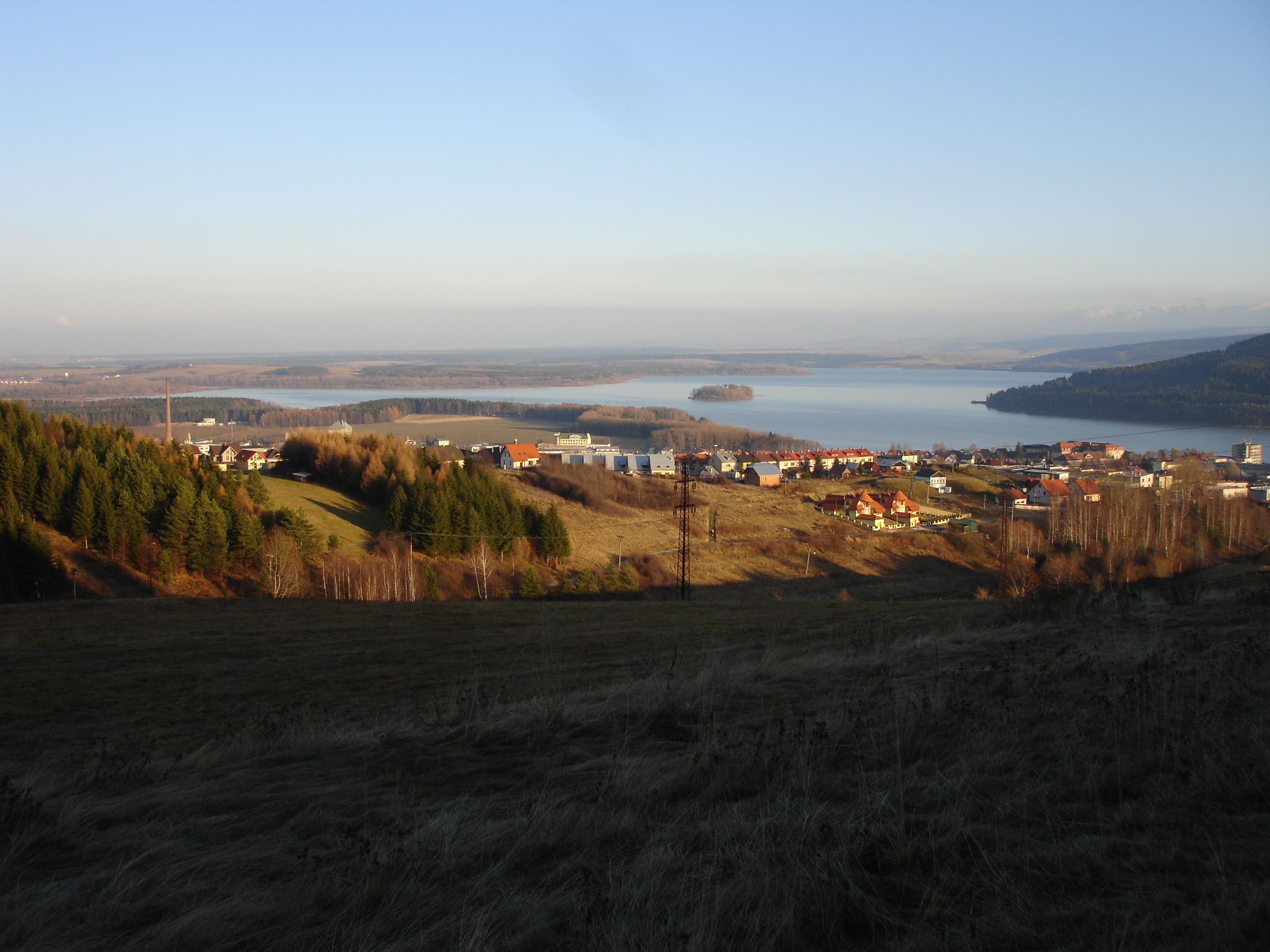
Námestovo in autumn

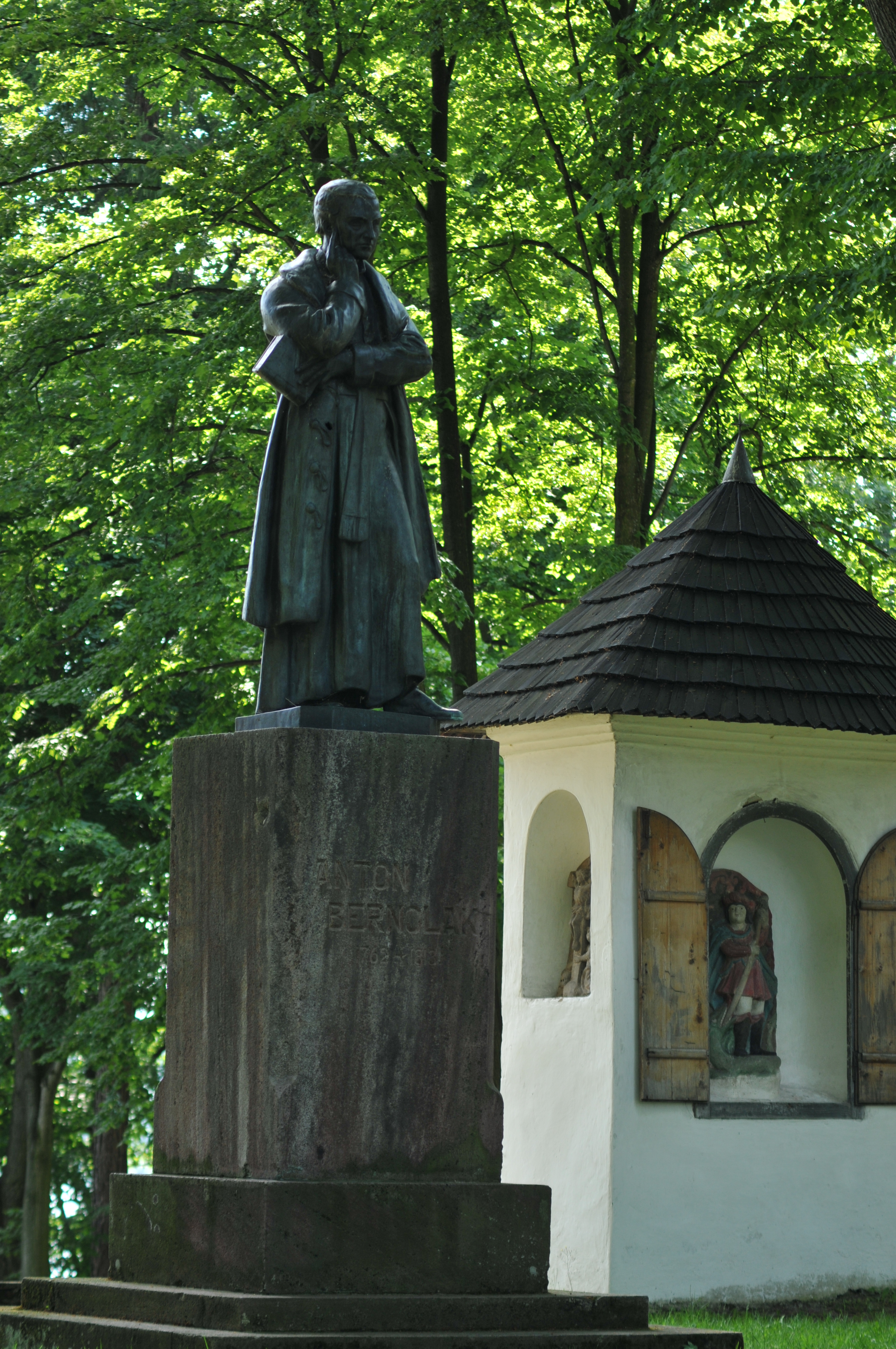
Statue of Anton Bernolák on Slanica Isle

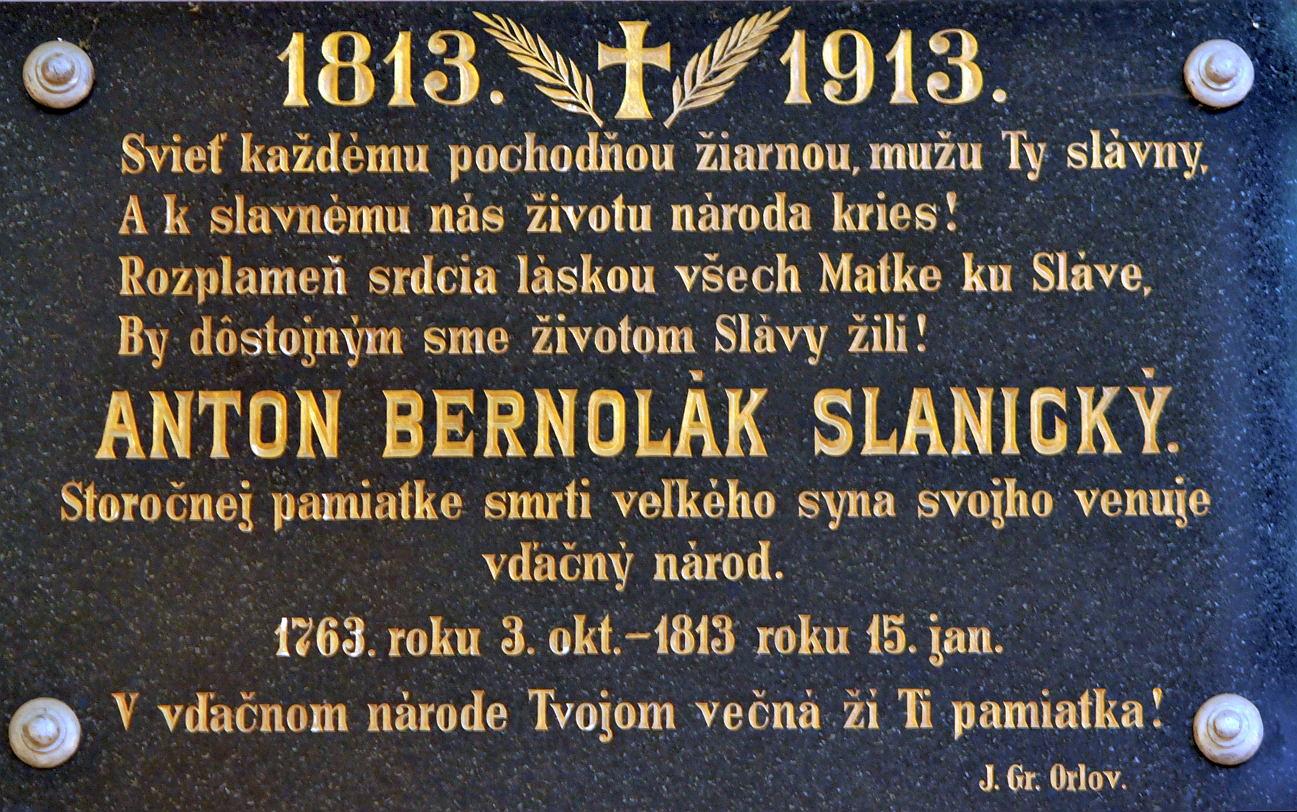
A memorial plaque to Anton Bernolák on Slanica Isle

== People ==
- Jozef Kabaň
- Dušan Tittel
- Anton Bernolák

== See also ==
- Namestovo church
