= List of twin towns and sister cities in Poland =

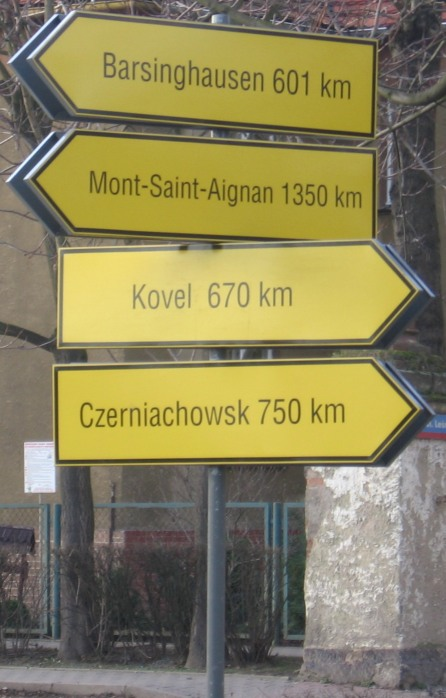
Signpost of twin towns in Brzeg Dolny

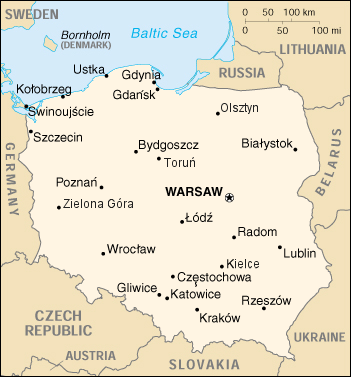
Map of Poland

This is a list of places in Poland having standing links to local communities in other countries known as "town twinning" (usually in Europe) or "sister cities" (usually in the rest of the world), in Polish miasta partnerskie.

== A ==
Aleksandrów Łódzki

- Krāslava, Latvia
- Ossiach, Austria
- Puget-Ville, France

Andrychów

- Břeclav, Czech Republic
- Isny im Allgäu, Germany
- Izium, Ukraine
- Khoni, Georgia
- Landgraaf, Netherlands
- Priverno, Italy
- Storozhynets, Ukraine
- Tukums, Latvia

Augustów

- Druskininkai, Lithuania
- Porto Ceresio, Italy
- Rudky, Ukraine
- Supraśl, Poland
- Tuusula, Finland

== B ==
=== Ba–Bl ===
Barlinek

- Gryfino, Poland
- Courrières, France
- Prenzlau, Germany
- Schneverdingen, Germany

Bartoszyce

- Berezne, Ukraine
- Emmaboda, Sweden
- Mława, Poland
- Nienburg, Germany
- Varėna, Lithuania

Będzin

- Basse-Ham, France
- Kaišiadorys, Lithuania
- Obukhiv, Ukraine
- Tatabánya, Hungary

Bełchatów

- Alcobaça, Portugal
- Aubergenville, France
- Csongrád, Hungary
- Děčín, Czech Republic
- Myślenice, Poland
- Pardubice, Czech Republic
- Pivdennoukrainsk, Ukraine
- Považská Bystrica, Slovakia
- Tauragė, Lithuania
- Zviahel, Ukraine

Bełżyce

- Báránd, Hungary
- Brody, Ukraine
- Šaštín-Stráže, Slovakia
- Shchyrets, Ukraine

Biała Podlaska

- Baranavichy, Belarus
- Brest, Belarus

Białe Błota

- Elbmarsch, Germany
- Vilnius District Municipality, Lithuania

Białogard

- Albano Laziale, Italy
- Alpignano, Italy
- Binz, Germany
- Caracal, Romania
- Gnosjö, Sweden
- Jēkabpils, Latvia
- Maardu, Estonia
- Montana, Bulgaria
- Olen, Belgium
- Teterow, Germany

Białystok

- Bahir Dar, Ethiopia
- Bălți, Moldova
- Bochum, Germany
- Bornova, Turkey
- Chongzuo, China
- Dobrich, Bulgaria
- Eindhoven, Netherlands
- Gori, Georgia
- Gyumri, Armenia
- Jelgava, Latvia
- Kaunas, Lithuania
- Lusaka, Zambia
- Lutsk, Ukraine
- Mazara del Vallo, Italy
- Milwaukee County, United States
- Saint-Louis, Senegal
- Sliema, Malta
- Sumgait, Azerbaijan
- Urgench, Uzbekistan
- Yehud-Monosson, Israel

Bielawa

- Chatham-Kent, Canada
- Ciechanów, Poland
- Hronov, Czech Republic
- Kostelec nad Orlicí, Czech Republic
- Lingen, Germany

Bielsk Podlaski

- Călăraşi, Romania
- Călărași District, Moldova
- Dve Mogili, Bulgaria
- Rakhiv, Ukraine

Bielsko-Biała

- Acre, Israel
- Baia Mare, Romania
- Besançon, France
- Berdiansk, Ukraine
- Frýdek-Místek, Czech Republic
- Grand Rapids, United States
- Kirklees, England, United Kingdom
- Kragujevac, Serbia
- Nyíregyháza, Hungary
- Szolnok, Hungary
- Třinec, Czech Republic
- Ustka, Poland
- Wolfsburg, Germany
- Žilina, Slovakia

Bieruń

- Gundelfingen, Germany
- Meung-sur-Loire, France
- Moravský Beroun, Czech Republic
- Ostroh, Ukraine

Biłgoraj

- Afula, Israel
- Bílina, Czech Republic
- Crailsheim, Germany
- Kelmė, Lithuania
- Novovolynsk, Ukraine
- Stropkov, Slovakia

Biskupiec

- Bramsche, Germany

Błonie

- Coreno Ausonio, Italy

=== Bo–By ===
Bochnia

- Bad Salzdetfurth, Germany
- Kežmarok, Slovakia
- Roselle, United States

Bogatynia

- Hrádek nad Nisou, Czech Republic
- Zittau, Germany

Boguchwała

- Bystřice nad Pernštejnem, Czech Republic
- Snina, Slovakia
- Trostyanets, Ukraine
- Vranov nad Topľou, Slovakia

Boguszów-Gorce

- Smiřice, Czech Republic

Bolesławiec

- Acuto, Italy
- Česká Lípa, Czech Republic
- Mariagerfjord, Denmark
- Molde, Norway
- Nogent-sur-Marne, France
- Pirna, Germany
- Prnjavor, Bosnia and Herzegovina
- Siegburg, Germany
- Vallecorsa, Italy
- Zbarazh, Ukraine

Bolków

- Bad Muskau, Germany
- Borken, Germany
- Doksy, Czech Republic

Brodnica

- Brørup (Vejen), Denmark
- Kėdainiai, Lithuania
- Strasburg, Germany

Brzeg

- Beroun, Czech Republic
- Bourg-en-Bresse, France
- Goslar, Germany

Brzeg Dolny

- Barsinghausen, Germany
- Kovel, Ukraine
- Mont-Saint-Aignan, France

Brzesko

- Langenenslingen, Germany
- Sovata, Romania
- Százhalombatta, Hungary

Brzozów

- Dobromyl, Ukraine
- Moldava nad Bodvou, Slovakia
- Sambir, Ukraine

Busko-Zdrój

- Khmilnyk, Ukraine
- Specchia, Italy
- Steinheim, Germany
- Sveti Martin na Muri, Croatia
- Szigetszentmiklós, Hungary

Bydgoszcz

- Cherkasy, Ukraine
- Hartford, United States
- Kragujevac, Serbia
- Kremenchuk, Ukraine
- Mannheim, Germany
- Ningbo, China
- Patras, Greece
- Pavlodar, Kazakhstan
- Perth, Scotland, United Kingdom
- Pitești, Romania
- Reggio Emilia, Italy
- Wilhelmshaven, Germany

Bystrzyca Kłodzka

- Amberg, Germany
- Kaźmierz, Poland
- Massa Martana, Italy
- Orlické Záhoří, Czech Republic
- Ústí nad Orlicí, Czech Republic
- Zdobnice, Czech Republic

Bytom

- Butte, United States
- Drohobych, Ukraine
- Ormož, Slovenia
- Recklinghausen, Germany
- Vsetín, Czech Republic
- Zhytomyr, Ukraine

Bytów

- Frankenberg, Germany
- Markaryd, Sweden
- Tauragė, Lithuania
- Winona, United States
- Zalischyky, Ukraine

== C ==
Chęciny

- Schöneck, Germany

Chełm

- Beit Sahour, Palestine
- Knoxville, United States
- Kovel, Ukraine
- Lutsk, Ukraine
- Mykolaiv, Ukraine
- Ozurgeti, Georgia
- Sindelfingen, Germany
- Utena, Lithuania

Chełmno

- Falkirk, Scotland, United Kingdom
- Hann. Münden, Germany
- Kaniv, Ukraine
- Letovice, Czech Republic

Chojna is a member of the Douzelage, a town twinning association of towns across the European Union. Chojna also has one other twin town.

Douzelage

- Agros, Cyprus
- Altea, Spain
- Asikkala, Finland
- Bad Kötzting, Germany
- Bellagio, Italy
- Bundoran, Ireland
- Granville, France
- Holstebro, Denmark
- Houffalize, Belgium
- Judenburg, Austria
- Kőszeg, Hungary
- Marsaskala, Malta
- Meerssen, Netherlands
- Niederanven, Luxembourg
- Oxelösund, Sweden
- Preveza, Greece
- Rokiškis, Lithuania
- Rovinj, Croatia
- Sesimbra, Portugal
- Sherborne, England, United Kingdom
- Sigulda, Latvia
- Siret, Romania
- Škofja Loka, Slovenia
- Sušice, Czech Republic
- Tryavna, Bulgaria
- Türi, Estonia
- Zvolen, Slovakia

Other

- Schwedt, Germany

Chojnice

- Bayeux, France
- Emsdetten, Germany
- Korsun-Shevchenkivskyi, Ukraine

Chojnów

- Commentry, France
- Egelsbach, Germany
- Mnichovo Hradiště, Czech Republic

Chorzów

- Creil, France
- Iserlohn, Germany
- Ózd, Hungary
- Termoli, Italy
- Ternopil, Ukraine
- Zlín, Czech Republic

Choszczno

- Fürstenwalde, Germany
- Ovruch, Ukraine

Chrzanów

- Harnes, France
- Nyékládháza, Hungary
- Ivano-Frankivsk, Ukraine

Ciechanów

- Bielawa, Poland
- Brezno, Slovakia
- Haldensleben, Germany
- Khmelnytskyi, Ukraine
- Meudon, France

Cieszyn

- Balchik, Bulgaria
- Cambrai, France
- Český Těšín, Czech Republic
- Genk, Belgium
- Puck, Poland
- Rožňava, Slovakia
- Teuva, Finland

Czechowice-Dziedzice

- Hiddenhausen, Germany
- Łomża, Poland
- Orlová, Czech Republic
- Rajec, Slovakia
- Slonim, Belarus

Czeladź

- Auby, France
- Jēkabpils, Latvia
- Várpalota, Hungary
- Zhydachiv, Ukraine

Czersk

- Boizenburg, Germany

Czerwionka-Leszczyny

- Cacica, Romania
- Dubno, Ukraine
- Jēkabpils, Latvia
- Sokołów Podlaski, Poland

Częstochowa

- Bethlehem, Palestine
- Kamianets-Podilskyi, Ukraine
- Loreto, Italy
- Lourdes, France
- Nazareth, Israel
- Ourém, Portugal
- Pforzheim, Germany
- Rēzekne, Latvia
- South Bend, United States
- Styria, Austria
- Zapopan, Mexico

Człuchów

- Conches-en-Ouche, France
- Kaniv, Ukraine
- Uslar, Germany

== D ==
Dąbrowa Górnicza

- Alchevsk, Ukraine
- Câmpulung Moldovenesc, Romania
- Mediaș, Romania
- Studénka, Czech Republic

Darłowo

- Brake, Germany
- Gardelegen, Germany
- Hässleholm, Sweden
- Nexø (Bornholm), Denmark
- Saint-Doulchard, France
- Starý Hrozenkov, Czech Republic
- Zingst, Germany

Dębica

- Kapuvár, Hungary
- Muro, Spain
- Puurs-Sint-Amands, Belgium
- Svishtov, Bulgaria

Dębica (rural gmina)

- Ciceu, Romania
- Hanušovce nad Topľou, Slovakia
- Härjedalen, Sweden
- Kapuvár, Hungary
- Morshyn, Ukraine
- Rudky, Ukraine
- Újszász, Hungary

Dębno

- Grodzisk Wielkopolski, Poland
- Nowy Tomyśl, Poland
- Postomino, Poland
- Renkum, Netherlands
- Strausberg, Germany
- Tczew, Poland
- Terezín, Czech Republic

Długołęka

- Fossano, Italy
- Sarny, Ukraine
- Velen, Germany

Dobre Miasto

- Kostopil, Ukraine
- Montierchaume, France
- Nieporęt, Poland
- Quakenbrück, Germany

Dopiewo

- Dallgow-Döberitz, Germany
- Maen Roch, France
- Schalkau, Germany
- Vilnius District Municipality, Lithuania

Drezdenko

- Winsen, Germany

Dzierżoniów

- Bischofsheim, Germany
- Crewe, England, United Kingdom
- Hajdúszoboszló, Hungary
- Kluczbork, Poland
- Lanškroun, Czech Republic
- Nantwich, England, United Kingdom
- Serock, Poland

== E ==
Elbląg

- Baoji, China
- Compiègne, France
- Coquimbo, Chile
- Druskininkai, Lithuania
- Laibin, China
- Leer, Germany
- Liepāja, Latvia
- Narva, Estonia
- Nowy Sącz, Poland
- Ronneby, Sweden
- Tainan, Taiwan
- Ternopil, Ukraine
- Trowbridge, England, United Kingdom

Ełk

- Alytus, Lithuania
- Nettetal, Germany

== G ==
=== Gd–Gn ===
Gdańsk

- Astana, Kazakhstan
- Bremen, Germany
- Cleveland, United States
- Kalmar, Sweden
- Nice, France
- Rotterdam, Netherlands
- Sefton, England, United Kingdom
- Turku, Finland
- Vilnius, Lithuania

Gdynia

- Aalborg, Denmark
- Brooklyn (New York), United States
- Côte d'Opale (communauté), France
- Haikou, China
- Karlskrona, Sweden
- Kiel, Germany
- Klaipėda, Lithuania
- Kotka, Finland
- Kristiansand, Norway
- Kunda (Viru-Nigula), Estonia
- Liepāja, Latvia
- Plymouth, England, United Kingdom
- Seattle, United States
- Zhytomyr, Ukraine

Giżycko

- Dubno, Ukraine
- Grodzisk Mazowiecki, Poland
- Querfurt, Germany
- Trakai, Lithuania
- Varėna, Lithuania

Gliwice

- Bottrop, Germany
- Dessau-Roßlau, Germany
- Doncaster, England, United Kingdom
- Kežmarok, Slovakia
- Nacka, Sweden
- Salgótarján, Hungary
- Valenciennes, France

Głogów

- Amber Valley, England, United Kingdom
- Eisenhüttenstadt, Germany
- Kamianets-Podilskyi, Ukraine
- Laholm, Sweden
- Langenhagen, Germany
- Riesa, Germany

Głogów Małopolski

- Ibrány, Hungary
- Lysá nad Labem, Czech Republic
- Nemenčinė, Lithuania
- Perechyn, Ukraine
- Spišské Podhradie, Slovakia

Głogówek

- Rietberg, Germany
- Vrbno pod Pradědem, Czech Republic

Głubczyce

- Krnov, Czech Republic
- Město Albrechtice, Czech Republic
- Rockenhausen, Germany
- Rusín, Czech Republic
- Saint-Rémy-sur-Avre, France
- Zbarazh, Ukraine

Głuchołazy

- Jeseník, Czech Republic
- Mikulovice, Czech Republic
- Zlaté Hory, Czech Republic

Gniezno

- Anagni, Italy
- Esztergom, Hungary
- Falkenberg, Sweden
- Radviliškis, Lithuania
- Saint-Malo, France
- Speyer, Germany
- Uman, Ukraine
- Veendam, Netherlands

=== Go ===
Godów

- Dolní Lutyně, Czech Republic
- Petrovice u Karviné, Czech Republic
- Stare Miasto, Poland

Gogolin

- Jablunkov, Czech Republic
- Kysucké Nové Mesto, Slovakia
- Łodygowice, Poland
- Schongau, Germany
- Zwierzyniec, Poland

Gołdap

- Ano Syros, Greece
- Giv'at Shmuel, Israel
- Šakiai, Lithuania
- Stade, Germany

Goleniów

- Bergen auf Rügen, Germany
- Greifswald, Germany
- Mölln, Germany
- Pyrzyce, Poland
- Svedala, Sweden

Goleszów

- Bystřice, Czech Republic
- Reiskirchen, Germany
- Vendryně, Czech Republic

Góra

- Herzberg am Harz, Germany

Góra Kalwaria

- Vorzel, Ukraine

Gorlice

- Bardejov, Slovakia
- Kalush, Ukraine
- Pápa, Hungary

Gorzów Wielkopolski

- Cava de' Tirreni, Italy
- Eberswalde, Germany
- Frankfurt an der Oder, Germany
- Herford (district), Germany
- Sumy, Ukraine
- Teramo, Italy

Gorzyce

- Bohumín, Czech Republic
- Dolní Lutyně, Czech Republic
- Kamianets-Podilskyi, Ukraine
- Stará Bystrica, Slovakia

Gostyń

- Ķekava, Latvia

Gostynin

- Langenfeld, Germany

=== Gr–Gu ===
Grodków

- Beckum, Germany
- Borshchiv, Ukraine

Grodzisk Mazowiecki

- Carros, France
- Danilovgrad, Montenegro
- Giżycko, Poland
- Radviliškis, Lithuania
- Weiz, Austria

Grodzisk Wielkopolski

- Biržai, Lithuania
- Brod, Bosnia and Herzegovina
- Dębno, Poland
- Delligsen, Germany
- Dolyna, Ukraine
- Merksplas, Belgium

Grójec

- Canosa di Puglia, Italy
- Spišská Nová Ves, Slovakia
- Strumica, North Macedonia

Grudziądz

- Falun, Sweden
- Gütersloh, Germany
- Nanning, China

Grybów (rural gmina)

- Château-Thierry, France

Gryfice

- Gryfów Śląski, Poland
- Güstrow, Germany
- Meldorf, Germany

Gryfino

- Barlinek, Poland
- Schwedt, Germany

Gubin

- Guben, Germany
- Kwidzyn, Poland
- Laatzen, Germany

== H ==
Hajnówka

- Jurbarkas, Lithuania
- Kamyenyets, Belarus
- Krāslava, Latvia
- Põhja-Sakala, Estonia
- Pruzhany, Belarus
- Svislach, Belarus

Hrubieszów

- Bijelo Polje, Montenegro
- Kamianets-Podilskyi, Ukraine
- Kapuvár, Hungary
- Svishtov, Bulgaria
- Sokal, Ukraine
- Volodymyr, Ukraine

== I ==
Iława

- Herborn, Germany
- Klaipėda District Municipality, Lithuania
- Tholen, Netherlands

Inowrocław

- Bad Oeynhausen, Germany

Izabelin

- Borken, Germany
- Dolni Chiflik, Bulgaria
- Méru, France
- Mickūnai, Lithuania

== J ==
Jabłonka

- Brebu, Romania
- Hořice, Czech Republic
- Nagymányok, Hungary
- Reichelsheim, Germany
- Trstená, Slovakia
- Wolbórz, Poland

Jarocin

- Hatvan, Hungary
- Libercourt, France
- Oleksandriia, Ukraine
- Opoczno, Poland
- Schlüchtern, Germany
- Veldhoven, Netherlands

Jarosław

- Dingelstädt, Germany
- Humenné, Slovakia
- Kőbánya (Budapest), Hungary
- Michalovce, Slovakia
- Orange, France
- Svidník, Slovakia
- Uzhhorod, Ukraine
- Vyškov, Czech Republic
- Yavoriv, Ukraine

Jasienica

- Petřvald, Czech Republic

Jasło

- Bardejov, Slovakia
- Camposampiero, Italy
- Hodonín, Czech Republic
- Makó, Hungary
- Prague 10 (Prague), Czech Republic
- Sambir, Ukraine
- Trebišov, Slovakia
- Truskavets, Ukraine

Jastrzębie-Zdrój

- Borshchiv, Ukraine
- Havířov, Czech Republic
- Ibbenbüren, Germany
- Karviná, Czech Republic
- Prievidza, Slovakia
- Tourcoing, France

Jawor

- Berdychiv, Ukraine
- Niepołomice, Poland
- Niesky, Germany
- Roseto degli Abruzzi, Italy
- Turnov, Czech Republic

Jaworzno

- Hereford, England, United Kingdom
- Karviná, Czech Republic
- Szigethalom, Hungary
- Yiwu, China

Jaworzyna Śląska

- Ostritz, Germany
- Peyremale, France
- Pfeffenhausen, Germany
- Teplice nad Metují, Czech Republic

Jędrzejów

- Keszthely, Hungary
- Reichenbach im Vogtland, Germany

Jelcz-Laskowice

- Gudensberg, Germany
- Rtyně v Podkrkonoší, Czech Republic
- Shchyrets, Ukraine

Jelenia Góra

- Bautzen, Germany
- Boxberg, Germany
- Cervia, Italy
- Changzhou, China
- Erftstadt, Germany
- Jablonec nad Nisou, Czech Republic
- Randers, Denmark
- Rivne, Ukraine
- Sievierodonetsk, Ukraine
- Tequila, Mexico
- Ternopil, Ukraine
- Tyler, United States
- Valkeakoski, Finland

== K ==
=== Ka–Kn ===
Kalisz

- Erfurt, Germany
- Hamm, Germany
- Hautmont, France
- Heerhugowaard, Netherlands
- Kamianets-Podilskyi, Ukraine
- La Louvière, Belgium
- Martin, Slovakia
- Preston, England, United Kingdom

Kalwaria Zebrzydowska

- Bisceglie, Italy
- Hamelin, Germany
- Levoča, Slovakia
- Moravské Budějovice, Czech Republic

Kamień Pomorski

- Bromölla, Sweden
- Kowary, Poland
- Lünen, Germany
- Porvoo, Finland
- Torgelow, Germany

Kamienna Góra

- Bitterfeld-Wolfen, Germany
- Dvůr Králové nad Labem, Czech Republic
- Ikast-Brande, Denmark
- Shchyrets, Ukraine
- Trutnov, Czech Republic
- Vierzon, France
- Wolfenbüttel, Germany

Kartuzy

- Caissargues, France
- Duderstadt, Germany
- Gori, Georgia
- Kaili, China
- Polanica-Zdrój, Poland

Katowice

- Cologne, Germany
- Groningen, Netherlands
- Kaohsiung, Taiwan
- Košice, Slovakia
- Lviv, Ukraine
- Miskolc, Hungary
- Mobile, United States
- Opava, Czech Republic
- Ostrava, Czech Republic
- Pula, Croatia
- Saint-Étienne, France
- Shenyang, China

Kąty Wrocławskie

- Biblis, Germany
- Mignaloux-Beauvoir, France
- Svitlovodsk Raion, Ukraine
- Żerków, Poland

Kędzierzyn-Koźle

- Jonava, Lithuania
- Kalush, Ukraine
- Öhringen, Germany
- Pisz, Poland
- Přerov, Czech Republic
- Racibórz, Poland

Kępno

- Encs, Hungary
- Giano dell'Umbria, Italy
- Trutnov, Czech Republic

Kętrzyn

- Volodymyr, Ukraine
- Wesel, Germany
- Zlaté Hory, Czech Republic

Kętrzyn (rural gmina)

- Gulbene, Latvia
- Mauron, France
- Prienai, Lithuania
- Rietavas, Lithuania

Kęty

- Courcelles, Belgium
- Keť, Slovakia
- Kéty, Hungary
- Rajec, Slovakia
- Turzovka, Slovakia

Kielce

- Csepel (Budapest), Hungary
- Gotha, Germany
- Orange, France
- Ramla, Israel
- Vinnytsia, Ukraine

Kłobuck

- Štúrovo, Slovakia

Kłodzko

- Bensheim, Germany
- Carvin, France
- Fléron, Belgium
- Limanowa, Poland
- Náchod, Czech Republic
- Rădăuți, Romania
- Rychnov nad Kněžnou, Czech Republic

Kłodzko (rural gmina)

- Georgsmarienhütte, Germany
- Rytro, Poland
- Zbąszyń, Poland

Kluczbork

- Bad Dürkheim, Germany
- Berezhany, Ukraine
- Dzierżoniów, Poland

Knurów

- Kazincbarcika, Hungary
- Svit, Slovakia

=== Ko ===
Kobylnica

- Bátonyterenye, Hungary
- Jirkov, Czech Republic
- Kościelisko, Poland
- Malá Morávka, Czech Republic
- Marneuli, Georgia
- Nižná Sitnica, Slovakia
- Przemęt, Poland
- Tvrdošín, Slovakia
- Valga, Estonia
- Valka, Latvia
- Víťaz, Slovakia
- Walce, Poland
- Zarszyn, Poland

Kolbuszowa

- Apensen, Germany
- Cassino, Italy
- Cobh, Ireland
- Mátészalka, Hungary
- Ploërmel, France
- Staryi Sambir, Ukraine

Kołobrzeg

- Bad Oldesloe, Germany
- Barth, Germany
- Koekelberg, Belgium
- Maneiro, Venezuela
- Opatija, Croatia
- Pankow (Berlin), Germany
- Pori, Finland
- Simrishamn, Sweden

Komorniki

- Kamienica, Poland
- Smižany, Slovakia
- Vilnius District Municipality, Lithuania

Konin

- Akmenė, Lithuania
- Chernivtsi, Ukraine
- Deyang, China
- Dobele, Latvia
- Hénin-Beaumont, France
- Herne, Germany
- Joniškis, Lithuania
- Karlovo, Bulgaria
- Santa Susanna, Spain
- Sundsvall, Sweden
- Ungheni, Moldova
- Valašské Meziříčí, Czech Republic
- Wakefield, England, United Kingdom

Końskie

- Mohyliv-Podilskyi, Ukraine
- Oroszlány, Hungary
- Šaľa, Slovakia

Konstancin-Jeziorna

- Denzlingen, Germany
- Hranice, Czech Republic
- Kremenets, Ukraine
- Naujoji Vilnia (Vilnius), Lithuania
- Pisogne, Italy
- Saint-Germain-en-Laye, France

Kórnik

- Bukowina Tatrzańska, Poland
- Königstein im Taunus, Germany
- Kościerzyna, Poland
- Uman, Ukraine

Koronowo

- Senden, Germany
- Spinetoli, Italy
- Vilnius District Municipality, Lithuania

Kościan

- Alzey, Germany
- Krimpen aan den IJssel, Netherlands
- Rakovník, Czech Republic
- Schmalkalden, Germany

Kościelisko

- Durbuy, Belgium
- Kobylnica, Poland
- Orimattila, Finland
- Östhammar, Sweden
- Tvrdošín, Slovakia
- Valga, Estonia
- Valka, Latvia

Kostrzyn

- Ocheretnya, Ukraine
- Pekela, Netherlands
- Volano, Italy

Kostrzyn nad Odrą

- Kavarna, Bulgaria
- Peitz, Germany
- Sambir, Ukraine
- Seelow, Germany

Koszalin

- Albano Laziale, Italy
- Bourges, France
- Fuzhou, China
- Gladsaxe, Denmark
- Ivano-Frankivsk, Ukraine
- Neubrandenburg, Germany
- Neumünster, Germany
- Schwedt, Germany
- Seinäjoki, Finland
- Tempelhof-Schöneberg (Berlin), Germany
- Trakai, Lithuania

Kowary

- Černý Důl, Czech Republic
- Dvůr Králové nad Labem, Czech Republic
- Kamień Pomorski, Poland
- Malá Úpa, Czech Republic
- Schönau-Berzdorf, Germany
- Terebovlia, Ukraine
- Vrchlabí, Czech Republic
- Vyshnivets, Ukraine
- Žacléř, Czech Republic

Koziegłowy

- Vatra Dornei, Romania

Kozienice

- Chuhuiv, Ukraine
- Göllheim, Germany
- Lanuvio, Italy
- Medzilaborce, Slovakia

Kożuchów

- Schwepnitz, Germany

Kozy

- Hričovské Podhradie, Slovakia
- Jásztelek, Hungary
- Kenderes, Hungary
- Mošovce, Slovakia

=== Kr–Kw ===
Kraków

- Bordeaux, France
- Bratislava, Slovakia
- Budapest, Hungary
- Curitiba, Brazil
- Cusco, Peru
- Edinburgh, Scotland, United Kingdom
- Fez, Morocco
- Frankfurt am Main, Germany
- Gothenburg, Sweden
- Innsbruck, Austria
- Kyiv, Ukraine
- Leipzig, Germany
- Leuven, Belgium
- Lviv, Ukraine
- Milan, Italy
- Nuremberg, Germany
- Olomouc, Czech Republic
- Orléans, France
- Quito, Ecuador
- Rochester, United States
- San Francisco, United States
- La Serena, Chile
- Solothurn, Switzerland
- Tbilisi, Georgia
- Vilnius, Lithuania
- Zagreb, Croatia

Krapkowice

- Camas, United States
- Ebersbach-Neugersdorf, Germany
- Hillsboro, United States
- Lipová-lázně, Czech Republic
- Morawica, Poland
- Partizánske, Slovakia
- Rohatyn, Ukraine
- Wissen, Germany
- Zabierzów, Poland

Kraśnik

- Hajdúböszörmény, Hungary
- Korosten, Ukraine
- Ruiselede, Belgium
- Šilalė, Lithuania
- Trogir, Croatia

Krasnystaw

- Alvesta, Sweden
- Horokhiv, Ukraine
- Püspökladány, Hungary
- Turiisk, Ukraine
- Žatec, Czech Republic

Krosno

- Creil, France
- Edewecht, Germany
- Gualdo Tadino, Italy
- Marl, Germany
- Øygarden, Norway
- Sárospatak, Hungary
- Uherské Hradiště, Czech Republic
- Uzhhorod, Ukraine
- Zalaegerszeg, Hungary

Krosno Odrzańskie

- Bremervörde, Germany
- Karcag, Hungary
- Schwarzheide, Germany

Krotoszyn

- Brummen, Netherlands
- Bucak, Turkey
- Dierdorf, Germany
- Fontenay-le-Comte, France
- Fonyód, Hungary
- Okinoshima, Japan
- Vilnius District Municipality, Lithuania

Krynica-Zdrój

- Amersham, England, United Kingdom
- Bad Sooden-Allendorf, Germany
- Bardejov, Slovakia
- Khmilnyk, Ukraine

Krzeszowice

- Chaumes-en-Brie, France
- Kispest (Budapest), Hungary

Kudowa-Zdrój

- Česká Skalice, Czech Republic
- Horn-Bad Meinberg, Germany
- Hronov, Czech Republic
- Náchod, Czech Republic
- Tuchola, Poland

Kutno

- Bat Yam, Israel

Kuźnia Raciborska

- Kelheim, Germany
- Odry, Czech Republic

Kwidzyn

- Bar, Ukraine
- Celle, Germany
- Gubin, Poland
- Olofström, Sweden

== L ==
=== La–Le ===
Łańcut

- Baktalórántháza, Hungary
- Balmazújváros, Hungary
- Levoča, Slovakia
- Tavira, Portugal
- Uman, Ukraine

Łask

- Elbtalaue, Germany

Łaziska Górne

- Fulnek, Czech Republic
- Vrútky, Slovakia

Lębork

- Balta, Ukraine
- Dudelange, Luxembourg
- Lauenburg, Germany
- Manom, France
- Sokal, Ukraine
- Vawkavysk, Belarus

Łęczna

- Hajdúhadház, Hungary
- Kovel, Ukraine
- Treviolo, Italy

Łęczyca

- Penzlin, Germany
- Rillieux-la-Pape, France
- Rypin, Poland
- Volodymyr, Ukraine

Lędziny

- Revúca, Slovakia
- Roccagorga, Italy
- Uničov, Czech Republic

Legionowo

- Borjomi, Georgia
- Carnikava, Latvia
- Jiujiang, China
- Kovel, Ukraine
- Rzhev, Russia
- Sevlievo, Bulgaria
- Vyzhnytsia, Ukraine

Legnica

- Blansko, Czech Republic
- Drohobych, Ukraine
- Meissen, Germany
- Roanne, France
- Wuppertal, Germany

Leśnica

- Černošice, Czech Republic
- Crostwitz, Germany
- Gerbrunn, Germany
- Hirschaid, Germany
- Karnes County, United States
- Voitsberg, Austria

Leszno

- Deurne, Netherlands
- Dunaújváros, Hungary
- Montluçon, France
- Suhl, Germany
- Žďár nad Sázavou, Czech Republic

Lesznowola

- Ialoveni, Moldova

=== Li–Lo ===
Lidzbark Warmiński

- Hoeksche Waard, Netherlands
- Milanówek, Poland
- Sovetsk, Russia
- Visaginas, Lithuania
- Werlte, Germany

Limanowa

- Dolný Kubín, Slovakia
- Kłodzko, Poland
- Mrągowo, Poland
- Nagykálló, Hungary
- Niles, United States
- Truskavets, Ukraine
- Wathlingen, Germany

Limanowa (rural gmina)

- Oravská Poruba, Slovakia

Łobez

- Affing, Germany
- Guča (Lučani), Serbia
- Kėdainiai, Lithuania
- Paikuse (Pärnu), Estonia
- Rajcza, Poland
- Svalöv, Sweden
- Wiek, Germany

Łodygowice

- Gogolin, Poland
- Kysucké Nové Mesto, Slovakia

Łódź

- Barreiro, Portugal
- Chemnitz, Germany
- Chengdu, China
- Guangzhou, China
- Lviv, Ukraine
- Lyon, France
- Murcia, Spain
- Odesa, Ukraine
- Puebla, Mexico
- Rustavi, Georgia
- Stuttgart, Germany
- Szeged, Hungary
- Tainan, Taiwan
- Tampere, Finland
- Tel Aviv, Israel
- Tianjin, China
- Vilnius, Lithuania

Łomianki

- Columbia Heights, United States
- Noyelles-lès-Vermelles, France

Łomża

- Czechowice-Dziedzice, Poland
- Kolomyia, Ukraine
- Muscatine, United States
- Pavlikeni, Bulgaria
- Sigtuna, Sweden
- Zviahel, Ukraine

Łowicz

- Cheektowaga, United States
- Colditz, Germany
- Lubliniec, Poland
- Montoire-sur-le-Loir, France
- Reda, Poland
- Šalčininkai, Lithuania
- Saluzzo, Italy
- Shepetivka, Ukraine
- Stupava, Slovakia

=== Lu–Lw ===
Lubaczów

- Érd, Hungary
- Levice, Slovakia
- Reghin, Romania
- Sobrance, Slovakia
- Tostedt, Germany
- Yavoriv, Ukraine

Lubań

- Kamenz, Germany
- Kolín, Czech Republic
- Königsbrück, Germany
- Löbau, Germany
- Prienai, Lithuania

Lubartów

- Hajdúdorog, Hungary
- Raseiniai, Lithuania
- Slavuta, Ukraine

Lubawka

- Adršpach, Czech Republic
- Žacléř, Czech Republic

Lubin

- Rhein-Lahn (district), Germany

Lubin (rural gmina)

- Sathonay-Camp, France

Lublin

- Alcalá de Henares, Spain
- Debrecen, Hungary
- Delmenhorst, Germany
- Erie, United States
- Ivano-Frankivsk, Ukraine
- Jiaozuo, China
- Kamianets-Podilskyi, Ukraine
- Kharkiv, Ukraine
- Kryvyi Rih, Ukraine
- Lancaster, England, United Kingdom
- Luhansk, Ukraine
- Lutsk, Ukraine
- Lviv, Ukraine
- Münster, Germany
- Nancy, France
- Nilüfer, Turkey
- Panevėžys, Lithuania
- Pernik, Bulgaria
- Rishon LeZion, Israel
- Starobilsk, Ukraine
- Rivne, Ukraine
- Sumy, Ukraine
- Tbilisi, Georgia
- Tilburg, Netherlands
- Timișoara, Romania
- Vanadzor, Armenia
- Viseu, Portugal
- Windsor, Canada

Lubliniec

- Bánovce nad Bebravou, Slovakia
- Kiskunmajsa, Hungary
- Kravaře, Czech Republic
- Łowicz, Poland
- Reda, Poland
- Teruel, Spain

Lubsko

- Brody, Poland
- Forst, Germany
- Gribskov, Denmark
- Masny, France
- Pavlohrad, Ukraine
- Vlotho, Germany

Łuków

- Baranivka, Ukraine
- Lazdijai, Lithuania
- Tõrva, Estonia
- Voisins-le-Bretonneux, France

Lwówek Śląski

- Chrastava, Czech Republic
- Heidenau, Germany
- Lwówek, Poland
- Noidans-lès-Vesoul, France
- Velký Šenov, Czech Republic
- Wilthen, Germany

== M ==
Maków

- Ludza, Latvia
- Molėtai, Lithuania
- Purgstall an der Erlauf, Austria

Maków Podhalański

- Mezőtúr, Hungary
- Władysławowo, Poland
- Zubrohlava, Slovakia

Malbork

- Kilkenny, Ireland
- Margny-lès-Compiègne, France
- Monheim am Rhein, Germany
- Nordhorn, Germany
- Offagna, Italy
- Sölvesborg, Sweden
- Trakai, Lithuania

Miastko

- Bad Fallingbostel, Germany
- Kelmė, Lithuania
- Périers, France

Miechów

- Herve, Belgium
- Volochysk, Ukraine

Miedźna

- Hustopeče, Czech Republic
- Zbarazh, Ukraine

Międzyrzecz

- Andrésy, France
- Bad Freienwalde, Germany
- Charlottenburg-Wilmersdorf (Berlin), Germany
- Haren, Germany
- Westerwolde, Netherlands

Międzyzdroje

- Bakhchysarai Raion, Ukraine
- Izola, Slovenia
- Lomma, Sweden
- Sellin, Germany

Miękinia

- Oria, Italy
- Schwarmstedt, Germany

Mielec

- Douchy-les-Mines, France
- Löhne, Germany
- Mukachevo, Ukraine
- Saint-Martin-des-Champs, France
- Saint-Thégonnec Loc-Eguiner, France
- Tiszaföldvár, Hungary
- Vila Nova de Poiares, Portugal

Mikołów

- Beuningen, Netherlands
- Ilava, Slovakia
- Klimkovice, Czech Republic
- Sainte-Geneviève-des-Bois, France

Milanówek

- Fumone, Italy
- Lidzbark Warmiński, Poland
- Welzheim, Germany

Milicz

- Kobuleti, Georgia
- Lohr am Main, Germany

Milówka

- Kóny, Hungary
- Markaz, Hungary
- Milíkov, Czech Republic
- Topoľníky, Slovakia
- Valentigney, France

Mińsk Mazowiecki

- Borodianka, Ukraine
- Krnov, Czech Republic
- Lacey, United States
- Pefki, Greece
- Saint-Égrève, France
- Telšiai, Lithuania

Mirsk

- Dubá, Czech Republic
- Lázně Libverda, Czech Republic
- Nové Město pod Smrkem, Czech Republic

Mława

- Barañáin, Spain
- Bartoszyce, Poland
- Kriva Palanka, North Macedonia
- Moscufo, Italy
- Năsăud, Romania
- Raseiniai, Lithuania
- Viernheim, Germany

Mogilno

- Brody, Ukraine
- Engelskirchen, Germany

Morawica

- Balanivka, Ukraine
- Camas, United States
- Herbolzheim, Germany
- Hillsboro, United States
- Krapkowice, Poland
- Priverno, Italy
- Rača (Bratislava), Slovakia
- Zabierzów, Poland

Mosina

- Seelze, Germany

Mrągowo

- Condom, France
- Grünberg, Germany
- Limanowa, Poland

Murowana Goślina

- Hemmingen, Germany
- Ochotnica Dolna, Poland
- Yvetot, France

Myślenice

- Bełchatów, Poland
- Csopak, Hungary
- Lüdenscheid, Germany
- Spišská Nová Ves, Slovakia
- Tinqueux, France

Myślibórz

- Kaunas, Lithuania
- Neuhardenberg, Germany
- Soltau, Germany

Mysłowice

- Enz (district), Germany
- Frýdek-Místek, Czech Republic

Myszków

- Los Alcázares, Spain
- Békés, Hungary
- Kopřivnice, Czech Republic
- Námestovo, Slovakia
- Zwönitz, Germany

== N ==
Nakło nad Notecią

- Elsterwerda, Germany
- Náklo, Czech Republic
- Naklo, Slovenia
- Seymour, United States

Namysłów

- Hlučín, Czech Republic
- Kisköre, Hungary
- Nebelschütz, Germany
- Yaremche, Ukraine
- Zagon, Romania

Niemodlin

- Dolyna, Ukraine
- Pražmo, Czech Republic
- Štíty, Czech Republic
- Vechelde, Germany

Niepołomice

- Jawor, Poland
- Kuřim, Czech Republic
- Monselice, Italy
- Paliano, Italy
- Saint-Jean-de-la-Ruelle, France
- Szécsény, Hungary

Nieporęt

- Dobre Miasto, Poland
- Dolna Banya, Bulgaria
- Drahanská vrchovina (microregion), Czech Republic
- Strážske, Slovakia

Nisko

- Fehérgyarmat, Hungary
- Hecklingen, Germany
- Horodok, Ukraine
- Semerovo, Slovakia

Nowa Ruda

- Broumov, Czech Republic
- Castrop-Rauxel, Germany
- Wallers, France

Nowa Sarzyna

- Dolyna, Ukraine
- Olaine, Latvia

Nowa Sól

- Achim, Germany
- Fresagrandinaria, Italy
- Püttlingen, Germany
- Saint-Michel-sur-Orge, France
- Senftenberg, Germany
- Veszprém, Hungary
- Žamberk, Czech Republic

Nowogard

- Baltiysk, Russia
- Dubrovytsia, Ukraine
- Gornji Milanovac, Serbia
- Gützkow, Germany
- Heide, Germany
- Kävlinge, Sweden
- Veles, North Macedonia

Nowogród Bobrzański

- Cimișlia, Moldova
- Lübbenau, Germany
- Westerwolde, Netherlands

Nowogrodziec

- Großdubrau, Germany
- Peremyshliany Raion, Ukraine
- Srbac, Bosnia and Herzegovina

Nowy Dwór Gdański

- Hennef, Germany
- Sarny, Ukraine
- Velká nad Veličkou, Czech Republic

Nowy Dwór Mazowiecki

- Elektrėnai, Lithuania
- Niederorschel, Germany

Nowy Sącz

- Columbia County, United States
- Elbląg, Poland
- Gabrovo, Bulgaria
- Kiskunhalas, Hungary
- Narvik, Norway
- Netanya, Israel
- Prešov, Slovakia
- Stará Ľubovňa, Slovakia
- Stryi, Ukraine
- Suzhou, China
- Tarnów, Poland
- Tinley Park, United States
- Trakai, Lithuania
- Tropea, Italy

Nowy Targ

- Évry-Courcouronnes, France
- Kežmarok, Slovakia
- Radevormwald, Germany
- Roverbella, Italy

Nowy Tomyśl

- Biesenthal, Germany
- Dębno, Poland
- Goch, Germany
- Sulęcin, Poland

Nowy Żmigród

- Putnok, Hungary
- Tisovec, Slovakia

Nysa

- Batumi, Georgia
- Ingelheim am Rhein, Germany
- Jeseník, Czech Republic
- Kolomyia, Ukraine
- Lüdinghausen, Germany
- Šumperk, Czech Republic
- Ternopil, Ukraine

== O ==
=== Ob–Op ===
Oborniki

- Herk-de-Stad, Belgium
- Kobuleti, Georgia
- Lüchow, Germany
- Novoiavorivsk, Ukraine

Odolanów

- Heringen/Helme, Germany
- Heringen (Werra), Germany
- Martvili, Georgia
- La Mézière, France
- Nyasvizh, Belarus
- Saulkrasti, Latvia

Ogrodzieniec

- Bogács, Hungary
- Forbach, Germany
- Groß-Bieberau, Germany
- Melissano, Italy
- Ohrid, North Macedonia
- Spišské Podhradie, Slovakia
- Tuczno, Poland

Oława

- Česká Třebová, Czech Republic
- Oberasbach, Germany
- Priolo Gargallo, Italy
- Sighetu Marmației, Romania
- Zolochiv, Ukraine

Oława (rural gmina)

- Pidhaitsi Raion, Ukraine
- Rudamina, Lithuania

Oleśnica

- Chrudim, Czech Republic
- Jaunay-Marigny, France
- Warendorf, Germany

Olesno

- Arnsberg, Germany
- Zalakaros, Hungary

Olkusz

- Bergamo, Italy
- Bjerringbro (Viborg), Denmark
- Bruay-la-Buissière, France
- Pontenure, Italy
- Schwalbach am Taunus, Germany
- Staffordshire Moorlands, England, United Kingdom

Olsztyn

- Châteauroux, France
- Gelsenkirchen, Germany
- Lutsk, Ukraine
- Offenburg, Germany
- Richmond, United States
- Rivne, Ukraine
- Rovaniemi, Finland
- Weifang, China

Olsztynek

- Banská Štiavnica, Slovakia
- Déols, France
- Felsőzsolca, Hungary
- Łapsze Niżne, Poland
- Luant, France
- Le Poinçonnet, France
- Strängnäs, Sweden
- Vilnius District Municipality, Lithuania
- Walkenried, Germany

Opoczno

- Bytča, Slovakia
- Jarocin, Poland
- Opočno, Czech Republic

Opole

- Alytus, Lithuania
- Bruntál, Czech Republic
- Carrara, Italy
- Grasse, France
- Ingolstadt, Germany
- Ivano-Frankivsk, Ukraine
- Kuopio, Finland
- Mülheim an der Ruhr, Germany
- Potsdam, Germany
- Roanoke, United States
- Székesfehérvár, Hungary

=== Os–Oz ===
Ostróda

- Auxonne, France
- Ocho Rios, Jamaica
- Osterode am Harz, Germany
- Tauragė, Lithuania

Ostróda (rural gmina)

- Korets Raion, Ukraine
- Šilutė, Lithuania

Ostrołęka

- Alytus, Lithuania
- Balassagyarmat, Hungary
- Lagodekhi, Georgia
- Meppen, Germany
- Masty, Belarus
- Pryluky, Ukraine

Ostrów Mazowiecka

- Brembate di Sopra, Italy
- Iziaslav, Ukraine

Ostrów Mazowiecka (rural gmina)

- Põhja-Pärnumaa, Estonia

Ostrów Wielkopolski

- Bergerac, France
- Brantford, Canada
- Delitzsch, Germany
- Lecce, Italy
- Nordhausen, Germany

Ostrowiec Świętokrzyski

- Bekabad, Uzbekistan
- Bila Tserkva, Ukraine
- Gennevilliers, France
- Pineto, Italy
- Scunthorpe, England, United Kingdom

Ostrzeszów

- Stuhr, Germany

Oświęcim

- Arezzo, Italy
- Ballan-Miré, France
- Breisach, Germany
- Cori, Italy
- Kerpen, Germany
- Sambir, Ukraine

Otmuchów

- Bernkastel-Kues, Germany
- La Bourboule, France
- Javorník, Czech Republic
- Lopatyn, Ukraine
- Milo, Italy
- Varsány, Hungary

Otwock

- Lennestadt, Germany
- Saint-Amand-Montrond, France

Ożarów

- Krościenko nad Dunajcem, Poland
- Spišská Belá, Slovakia

Ozimek

- Heinsberg, Germany
- Krompachy, Slovakia
- Přerov, Czech Republic
- Rýmařov, Czech Republic

Ozorków

- Trstená, Slovakia
- Vysoké Mýto, Czech Republic

== P ==
=== Pa–Pi ===
Pabianice

- Gusev, Russia
- Kerepes, Hungary
- Plauen, Germany
- Rokiškis, Lithuania

Paczków

- Einbeck, Germany
- Uzès, France

Parczew

- Bressuire, France
- Liuboml, Ukraine
- Prienai, Lithuania

Pasłęk

- La Couronne, France
- Itzehoe, Germany

Pawłowice

- Perkupa, Hungary
- Teplička nad Váhom, Slovakia
- Verquin, France

Piaseczno

- Chitignano, Italy
- Harku, Estonia
- Huanggang, China

Piekary Śląskie

- Kobuleti, Georgia
- Kroměříž, Czech Republic
- Marija Bistrica, Croatia

Piła

- Châtellerault, France
- Imola, Italy
- Schwerin, Germany

Piława Górna

- Airaines, France
- Dobruška, Czech Republic
- Kriftel, Germany
- Pohoří, Czech Republic

Pińczów

- Bystřice, Czech Republic
- Caudry, France
- Ploiești, Romania
- Svodín, Slovakia
- Tata, Hungary

Piotrków Trybunalski

- Esslingen am Neckar, Germany
- Marijampolė, Lithuania
- Mosonmagyaróvár, Hungary
- Ness Ziona, Israel
- Petrinja, Croatia
- Rivne, Ukraine
- Vienne, France
- Žagubica, Serbia

Pisz

- Alytus District Municipality, Lithuania
- Irpin, Ukraine
- Kędzierzyn-Koźle, Poland
- Mustvee, Estonia
- Schleswig-Flensburg, Germany
- Voranava District, Belarus

Piwniczna-Zdrój

- Keszthely, Hungary
- Mníšek nad Popradom, Slovakia

=== Pl–Po ===
Pleszew

- Kemer, Turkey
- Morlanwelz, Belgium
- Saint-Pierre-d'Oléron, France
- Spangenberg, Germany
- Westerstede, Germany

Płock

- Auxerre, France
- Bălți, Moldova
- Darmstadt, Germany
- Forlì, Italy
- Fort Wayne, United States
- Huai'an, China
- Loznica, Serbia
- Mažeikiai, Lithuania
- Pleven, Bulgaria
- Rustavi, Georgia
- Sines, Portugal
- Thurrock, England, United Kingdom
- Veszprém, Hungary
- Zhytomyr, Ukraine

Płońsk

- Antoing, Belgium
- Bakhchysarai, Ukraine
- Čakovec, Croatia
- Crépy-en-Valois, France
- Mosciano Sant'Angelo, Italy
- Notaresco, Italy
- Ramat HaNegev, Israel
- Šalčininkai, Lithuania
- Ternopil, Ukraine
- Tiszafüred, Hungary

Pniewy

- Halluin, France
- Lübbenau, Germany
- Oer-Erkenschwick, Germany

Pobiedziska

- Haaren, Netherlands
- Marktheidenfeld, Germany
- Montfort-sur-Meu, France
- Växjö, Sweden

Podgórzyn

- Desná, Czech Republic
- Górzyca, Poland
- Schirgiswalde-Kirschau, Germany
- Smołdzino, Poland
- Špindlerův Mlýn, Czech Republic

Polanica-Zdrój

- Česká Skalice, Czech Republic
- Janské Lázně, Czech Republic
- Kartuzy, Poland
- Telgte, Germany

Police

- Novyi Rozdil, Ukraine
- Pasewalk, Germany

Polkowice

- Sickte, Germany

Poniatowa

- Groß-Siegharts, Austria
- Steglitz-Zehlendorf (Berlin), Germany

Poraj

- Belá-Dulice, Slovakia
- Pohořelice, Czech Republic
- Vilnius District Municipality, Lithuania

Poznań

- Assen, Netherlands
- Brno, Czech Republic
- Győr, Hungary
- Hanover, Germany
- Jyväskylä, Finland
- Kharkiv, Ukraine
- Kutaisi, Georgia
- Nablus, Palestine
- Nottinghamshire, England, United Kingdom
- Pozuelo de Alarcón, Spain
- Ra'anana, Israel
- Rennes, France
- Shenzhen, China
- Toledo, United States

=== Pr–Py ===
Prudnik

- Bohumín, Czech Republic
- Krnov, Czech Republic
- Nadvirna, Ukraine
- Northeim, Germany
- San Giustino, Italy

Pruszcz Gdański

- Hofheim am Taunus, Germany
- Šilutė, Lithuania

Przemyśl

- Drohobych, Ukraine
- Eger, Hungary
- Humenné, Slovakia
- Kamyanets-Podilskyi, Ukraine
- Lviv, Ukraine
- Mostyska, Ukraine
- Paderborn, Germany
- South Kesteven, England, United Kingdom
- Truskavets, Ukraine

Przeworsk

- Berehove, Ukraine
- Mělník, Czech Republic
- Moravský Krumlov, Czech Republic

Pszczyna

- Bergisch Gladbach, Germany
- Holešov, Czech Republic
- Kaštela, Croatia
- Klein Rönnau, Germany

Pszów

- Horní Benešov, Czech Republic

Puławy

- Boyarka, Ukraine
- Castelo Branco, Portugal
- Dubliany, Ukraine
- Nyasvizh, Belarus
- Stendal, Germany

Pułtusk

- Ganderkesee, Germany
- Montmorency, France
- New Britain, United States
- Senica, Slovakia
- Szerencs, Hungary

Pyrzyce

- Bad Sülze, Germany
- Goleniów, Poland
- Korbach, Germany
- Vysoké Mýto, Czech Republic
- Złocieniec, Poland

Pyskowice

- Flörsheim am Main, Germany
- La Ricamarie, France
- Sheptytskyi, Ukraine

== R ==
Rabka-Zdrój

- Château-Gontier, France
- Frome, England, United Kingdom
- Kiskunfélegyháza, Hungary
- Murrhardt, Germany

Racibórz

- Kędzierzyn-Koźle, Poland
- Leverkusen, Germany
- Opava, Czech Republic
- Roth, Germany
- Tysmenytsia, Ukraine
- Villeneuve-d'Ascq, France
- Zugló (Budapest), Hungary

Radlin

- Genthin, Germany
- Mohelnice, Czech Republic
- Rohatyn, Ukraine

Radom

- Banská Bystrica, Slovakia
- Daugavpils, Latvia
- Huzhou, China
- Magdeburg, Germany
- Ploiești, Romania
- Stara Zagora, Bulgaria
- Taoyuan, Taiwan
- Vilnius District Municipality, Lithuania

Radomsko

- Kiryat Bialik, Israel
- Lincoln, England, United Kingdom
- Makó, Hungary
- Olaine, Latvia
- Voznesensk, Ukraine

Rawa Mazowiecka

- Boskovice, Czech Republic
- Nyírbátor, Hungary

Rawicz

- Attendorn, Germany
- Hlybokaye, Belarus

Reda

- Łowicz, Poland
- Lubliniec, Poland
- Vilnius District Municipality, Lithuania
- Waldbronn, Germany

Reszel

- Jašiūnai (Šalčininkai), Lithuania
- Jemnice, Czech Republic
- Legden, Germany
- Raabs an der Thaya, Austria

Rogoźno

- Marijampolė, Lithuania
- La Trimouille, France
- Tulchyn, Ukraine
- Wustrow, Germany

Ropczyce

- Ochsenfurt, Germany
- Stropkov, Slovakia

Ruda Śląska

- Carrickfergus, Northern Ireland, United Kingdom
- Levice, Slovakia
- Mank, Austria
- Vibo Valentia, Italy

Rumia

- Dęblin, Poland
- Hultsfred, Sweden
- Švenčionys, Lithuania

Rybnik

- Antrim and Newtownabbey, Northern Ireland, United Kingdom
- Bar, Ukraine
- Dorsten, Germany
- Eurasburg, Germany
- Ivano-Frankivsk, Ukraine
- Karviná, Czech Republic
- Labin, Croatia
- Larissa, Greece
- Liévin, France
- Mazamet, France
- Saint-Vallier, France
- Topoľčany, Slovakia
- Vilnius District Municipality, Lithuania

Rydułtowy

- Hvidovre, Denmark
- Orlová, Czech Republic
- Reken, Germany

Rypin

- Bauska, Latvia
- Łęczyca, Poland
- Pakruojis, Lithuania
- Uggiate-Trevano, Italy

Rzeszów

- Bielefeld, Germany
- Buffalo, United States
- Chernihiv, Ukraine
- Fangchenggang, China
- Gainesville, United States
- Ivano-Frankivsk, Ukraine
- Kherson, Ukraine
- Klagenfurt, Austria
- Konotop, Ukraine
- Košice, Slovakia
- Lamia, Greece
- Lutsk, Ukraine
- Lviv, Ukraine
- Nyíregyháza, Hungary
- Rushmoor, England, United Kingdom
- Sacheon, South Korea
- Satu Mare, Romania
- Split, Croatia
- Truskavets, Ukraine

== S ==
=== Sa–Sk ===
Sandomierz

- Emmendingen, Germany
- Newark-on-Trent, England, United Kingdom
- Ostroh, Ukraine
- Volterra, Italy

Sanok

- Cestas, France
- Drohobych, Ukraine
- Gyöngyös, Hungary
- Humenné, Slovakia
- Kamianets-Podilskyi, Ukraine
- Östersund, Sweden
- Reinheim, Germany
- Truskavets, Ukraine

Serock

- Balatonalmádi, Hungary
- Celleno, Italy
- Dzierżoniów, Poland
- Ignalina, Lithuania
- Lanškroun, Czech Republic
- Radzionków, Poland

Sędziszów

- Mykulyntsi, Ukraine
- Skala-Podilska, Ukraine

Siedlce

- Berdychiv, Ukraine
- Dasing, Germany
- Pescantina, Italy
- Sabinov, Slovakia
- Vilnius District Municipality, Lithuania

Siemianowice Śląskie

- Câmpia Turzii, Romania
- Jablunkov, Czech Republic
- Köthen, Germany
- Mohács, Hungary
- Wattrelos, France

Siemiatycze

- Castrolibero, Italy
- Etterbeek, Belgium
- Kobryn, Belarus
- Pastavy, Belarus
- Zehdenick, Germany

Sieradz

- Annemasse, France
- Gaggenau, Germany
- Gospić, Croatia
- Yambol, Bulgaria

Skarżysko-Kamienna

- Franklin Park, United States
- Kavarna, Bulgaria
- Stafford, England, United Kingdom
- Zhmerynka, Ukraine

Skawina

- Civitanova Marche, Italy
- Holešov, Czech Republic
- Hürth, Germany
- Peremyshliany, Ukraine
- Roztoky, Czech Republic
- Thetford, England, United Kingdom
- Turčianske Teplice, Slovakia

Skierniewice

- Châtelaillon-Plage, France
- Gera, Germany
- Levice, Slovakia
- Lubny, Ukraine
- Szentes, Hungary

Skoczów

- Hrádek, Czech Republic

Skwierzyna

- Bernau bei Berlin, Germany
- Durbe, Latvia
- Fredersdorf-Vogelsdorf, Germany
- Międzychód, Poland

=== Sl–Sr ===
Sława

- Esneux, Belgium
- Luckau, Germany

Słubice

- Frankfurt an der Oder, Germany
- Heilbronn, Germany
- Shostka, Ukraine

Słupsk

- Bari, Italy
- Bukhara, Uzbekistan
- Carlisle, England, United Kingdom
- Cartaxo, Portugal
- Flensburg, Germany
- Fredrikstad, Norway
- Ustka, Poland
- Vantaa, Finland
- Vordingborg, Denmark

Sochaczew

- Horodok, Ukraine
- Melton Mowbray, England, United Kingdom

Sokołów Podlaski

- Czerwionka-Leszczyny, Poland
- Dubno, Ukraine
- Jēkabpils, Latvia

Sopot

- Bilhorod-Dnistrovskyi, Ukraine
- Frankenthal, Germany
- Karlshamn, Sweden
- Næstved, Denmark
- Ratzeburg, Germany
- Southend-on-Sea, England, United Kingdom
- Zakopane, Poland

Sosnowiec

- Derhachi, Ukraine
- Dziwnów, Poland
- Idar-Oberstein, Germany
- Komárom, Hungary
- Maârif (Casablanca), Morocco
- Les Mureaux, France
- Roubaix, France
- Suceava, Romania

Śrem

- Bergen, Germany
- Rožnov pod Radhoštěm, Czech Republic
- Świdnik, Poland

Środa Śląska

- Kamianka-Buzka, Ukraine
- Saterland, Germany
- Štěpánov, Czech Republic

Środa Wielkopolska

- Behringen (Hörselberg-Hainich), Germany
- Hennigsdorf, Germany
- Hoyerswerda, Germany
- Kralupy nad Vltavou, Czech Republic
- Mohyliv-Podilskyi, Ukraine
- Prostějov, Czech Republic
- Vitré, France

=== St–Su ===
Stalowa Wola

- Liuzhou, China

Starachowice

- Heywood, England, United Kingdom

Stargard

- Elmshorn, Germany
- Konotop, Ukraine
- Saldus, Latvia
- Stralsund, Germany
- Wijchen, Netherlands

Starogard Gdański

- Boryslav, Ukraine
- Diepholz, Germany
- Foshan, China
- Luohe, China

Stary Sącz

- Chuhuiv, Ukraine
- Dunakeszi, Hungary
- Keszthely, Hungary
- Kosd, Hungary
- Lambres-lez-Douai, France
- Levoča, Slovakia
- Liptovský Hrádok, Slovakia
- Menconico, Italy

Strumień

- Dolní Domaslavice, Czech Republic
- Dolný Hričov, Slovakia
- Krasňany, Slovakia
- Petřvald, Czech Republic
- Šenov, Czech Republic
- Súľov-Hradná, Slovakia

Strzegom

- Auerbach, Germany
- Hořice, Czech Republic
- Pavullo nel Frignano, Italy
- Pidhaitsi, Ukraine
- Znojmo, Czech Republic

Strzelce Krajeńskie

- Angermünde, Germany
- Jammerbugt, Denmark
- Tornesch, Germany

Strzelce Opolskie

- Bandera, United States
- Druskininkai, Lithuania
- Holice, Czech Republic
- Soest, Germany
- Tysmenytsia, Ukraine

Strzelin

- Frankenberg, Germany
- Libchavy, Czech Republic
- Straelen, Germany
- Svitavy, Czech Republic
- Trutnov, Czech Republic

Strzyżów is a member of the Charter of European Rural Communities, a town twinning association across the European Union. Strzyżów also has several other twin towns.

Charter of European Rural Communities

- Bienvenida, Spain
- Bièvre, Belgium
- Bucine, Italy
- Cashel, Ireland
- Cissé, France
- Desborough, England, United Kingdom
- Esch (Haaren), Netherlands
- Hepstedt, Germany
- Ibănești, Romania
- Kandava (Tukums), Latvia
- Kannus, Finland
- Kolindros, Greece
- Lassee, Austria
- Medzev, Slovakia
- Næstved, Denmark
- Nagycenk, Hungary
- Nadur, Malta
- Ockelbo, Sweden
- Pano Lefkara, Cyprus
- Põlva, Estonia
- Samuel (Soure), Portugal
- Starý Poddvorov, Czech Republic
- Svoge, Bulgaria
- Tisno, Croatia
- Troisvierges, Luxembourg
- Žagarė (Joniškis), Lithuania

Other

- Bagnacavallo, Italy
- Horodok, Ukraine
- Kisvárda, Hungary
- Namsos, Norway
- Svidník, Slovakia

Suchy Las

- Hnivan, Ukraine
- Isernhagen, Germany
- Poronin, Poland
- Tamási, Hungary

Sulechów

- Fürstenwalde, Germany
- Rushmoor, England, United Kingdom

Sulęcin

- Beeskow, Germany
- Friedland, Germany
- Kamen, Germany
- Nowy Tomyśl, Poland

Sulejówek

- Bourg-la-Reine, France
- Viimsi, Estonia
- Vilnius District Municipality, Lithuania
- Yalvaç, Turkey

Suwałki

- Alytus, Lithuania
- Grande-Synthe, France
- Marijampolė, Lithuania
- Notodden, Norway
- Võru, Estonia
- Waren, Germany

=== Sw ===
Swarzędz

- Duclair, France
- Ronnenberg, Germany

Świdnica

- Biberach an der Riss, Germany
- Ivano-Frankivsk, Ukraine
- Kazincbarcika, Hungary
- Nizhyn, Ukraine
- Police nad Metují, Czech Republic
- Švenčionys, Lithuania
- Trutnov, Czech Republic
- Tendring, England, United Kingdom

Świdnica (rural gmina)

- Ermont, France
- Lampertheim, Germany
- Maldegem, Belgium
- Żukowo, Poland
- Zviahel Raion, Ukraine

Świdnik

- Aalten, Netherlands
- Béthune, France
- Brindisi, Italy
- Radun, Belarus
- Rechytsa, Belarus
- Shostka, Ukraine
- Śrem, Poland
- Svidník, Slovakia
- Valjevo, Serbia
- Welwyn Hatfield, England, United Kingdom

Świebodzice

- Hrušov, Slovakia
- Jilemnice, Czech Republic
- Marjina Horka, Belarus
- Waldbröl, Germany

Świebodzin

- Friesoythe, Germany
- Herzberg, Germany
- Neuenhagen bei Berlin, Germany

Świecie

- Gernsheim, Germany
- Pieszyce, Poland

Świerzawa

- Chocz, Poland
- Kottmar, Germany
- Malá Skála, Czech Republic

Świętochłowice

- Chystiakove, Ukraine
- Heiloo, Netherlands
- Laa an der Thaya, Austria
- Nový Jičín, Czech Republic
- Rimavská Sobota, Slovakia
- Tai'an, China
- Tiszaújváros, Hungary

Świnoujście

- Heringsdorf, Germany
- Nordenham, Germany
- Vorpommern-Greifswald, Germany
- Ystad, Sweden

=== Sy–Sz ===
Syców

- Malsch, Germany
- Yampil, Ukraine

Szamotuły

- Brignoles, France
- Bruneck, Italy
- Groß-Gerau, Germany
- Halderberge, Netherlands
- Mark, Sweden
- Tielt, Belgium

Szczecin

- Bari, Italy
- Bremerhaven, Germany
- Dnipro, Ukraine
- Esbjerg, Denmark
- Friedrichshain-Kreuzberg (Berlin), Germany
- Greifswald, Germany
- Kingston upon Hull, England, United Kingdom
- Klaipėda, Lithuania
- Malmö, Sweden
- Rostock, Germany
- St. Louis, United States

Szczecinek

- Bergen op Zoom, Netherlands
- Neustrelitz, Germany
- Noyelles-sous-Lens, France
- Söderhamn, Sweden

Szczekociny

- Adony, Hungary
- Jelšava, Slovakia

Szczytno

- Batočina, Serbia
- Herten, Germany
- Šalčininkai, Lithuania
- Żywiec, Poland

Szprotawa

- Gevelsberg, Germany
- Spremberg, Germany
- Uman, Ukraine

Sztum

- Kupiškis, Lithuania
- Polessk, Russia
- Ritterhude, Germany
- Val-de-Reuil, France

Szydłowiec

- Beynes, France
- Turda, Romania

== T ==
Tarnobrzeg

- Banská Bystrica, Slovakia
- Chernihiv, Ukraine
- Zolochiv Raion, Ukraine

Tarnów

- Bila Tserkva, Ukraine
- Blackburn, England, United Kingdom
- Casalmaggiore, Italy
- Kiskőrös, Hungary
- Nowy Sącz, Poland
- Schoten, Belgium
- Trenčín, Slovakia
- Veszprém, Hungary
- Udine, Italy

Tarnów (rural gmina)

- Jászalsószentgyörgy, Hungary
- Jászdózsa, Hungary
- Tornaľa, Slovakia

Tarnowo Podgórne

- Bardo, Poland
- Cologno al Serio, Italy
- Czorsztyn, Poland
- Fronreute, Germany
- Kamianets-Podilskyi, Ukraine
- Līvāni, Latvia
- Noordenveld, Netherlands
- Rohrdorf, Germany
- Šalčininkai, Lithuania
- Szemud, Poland
- Ukmergė, Lithuania

Tarnowskie Góry

- Békéscsaba, Hungary
- Bernburg, Germany
- Kutná Hora, Czech Republic
- Méricourt, France

Tczew

- Aizkraukle, Latvia
- Barking and Dagenham, England, United Kingdom
- Beauvais, France
- Biržai, Lithuania
- Chornomorsk, Ukraine
- Dębno, Poland
- Werder, Germany
- Witten, Germany

Tomaszów Mazowiecki

- Ivano-Frankivsk, Ukraine
- Linares, Spain
- Mionica, Serbia
- Polonezköy (Beykoz), Turkey

Toruń

- Bryan, United States
- Angers, France
- Čadca, Slovakia
- College Station, United States
- Göttingen, Germany
- Guilin, China
- Hämeenlinna, Finland
- Kaunas, Lithuania
- Leiden, Netherlands
- Lutsk, Ukraine
- Novo Mesto, Slovenia
- Philadelphia, United States
- Swindon, England, United Kingdom

Trzcianka

- Berwick-upon-Tweed, England, United Kingdom
- Duszniki-Zdrój, Poland
- Husum, Germany
- Lehrte, Germany
- Tomashpil, Ukraine

Trzebiatów

- Brwinów, Poland
- Großräschen, Germany
- Istebna, Poland
- Sjöbo, Sweden
- Wandlitz, Germany

Trzebinia

- Billy-Montigny, France
- Bönen, Germany
- Ishøj, Denmark
- Reggello, Italy

Trzebnica

- Kitzingen, Germany
- Vynnyky, Ukraine

Tuchola

- Kudowa-Zdrój, Poland
- Lübtheen, Germany
- Olching, Germany

Tuchów

- Baranivka, Ukraine
- Detva, Slovakia
- Illingen, Germany
- Martfű, Hungary
- Mikulov, Czech Republic
- Pettenbach, Austria
- Tăuții-Măgherăuș, Romania

Turek

- Brandýs nad Labem-Stará Boleslav, Czech Republic
- Dunaivtsi, Ukraine
- Rovinari, Romania
- Turhal, Turkey
- Uniejów, Poland
- Wiesmoor, Germany

Tychy

- Cassino, Italy
- Marzahn-Hellersdorf (Berlin), Germany

== U ==
Ustka

- Bielsko-Biała, Poland
- Homécourt, France
- Kappeln, Germany
- Palanga, Lithuania
- Słupsk, Poland

Ustroń

- Frenštát pod Radhoštěm, Czech Republic
- Hajdúnánás, Hungary
- Kalety, Poland
- Luhačovice, Czech Republic
- Neukirchen-Vluyn, Germany
- Piešťany, Slovakia
- Újbuda (Budapest), Hungary
- Ustronie Morskie, Poland

== W ==
=== Wa–Wi ===
Wadowice

- Assisi, Italy
- Canale d'Agordo, Italy
- Carpineto Romano, Italy
- Chicago Heights, United States
- Kecskemét, Hungary
- Marktl, Germany
- Ourém, Portugal
- Pietrelcina, Italy
- San Giovanni Rotondo, Italy
- Sona, Italy

Wągrowiec

- Adendorf, Germany
- Gyula, Hungary
- Krasnogorsk, Russia
- Le Plessis-Trévise, France
- Schönwalde-Glien, Germany

Wałbrzych

- Boryslav, Ukraine
- Cape Breton, Canada
- Foggia, Italy
- Freiberg, Germany
- Gżira, Malta
- Hradec Králové, Czech Republic
- Jastarnia, Poland
- Vannes, France

Wałcz

- Åstorp, Sweden
- Bad Essen, Germany
- Bailleul, France
- Kyritz, Germany
- Werne, Germany

Warsaw

- Astana, Kazakhstan
- Berlin, Germany
- Chicago, United States
- Düsseldorf, Germany
- Hanoi, Vietnam
- Kyiv, Ukraine
- Riga, Latvia
- Rio de Janeiro, Brazil
- Seoul, South Korea
- Taipei, Taiwan
- Tel Aviv, Israel
- Vilnius, Lithuania

Warta

- Szécsény, Hungary
- Tundzha, Bulgaria

Węgierska Górka

- Lengyeltóti, Hungary
- Pákozd, Hungary

Węgorzewo

- Leffrinckoucke, France
- Rotenburg an der Wümme, Germany
- Vilnius District Municipality, Lithuania
- Yavoriv, Ukraine

Węgrów

- Rokytne, Ukraine
- Skole, Ukraine
- Švenčionys, Lithuania
- Valsolda, Italy

Wieliczka

- Bergkamen, Germany
- Fano, Italy
- Litovel, Czech Republic
- Saint-André-lez-Lille, France
- Sesto Fiorentino, Italy

Wieliszew

- Agios Stefanos, Greece
- Graffignano, Italy
- Mielno, Poland
- Salaspils, Latvia
- Siret, Romania
- Trittau (Amt), Germany

Wieluń

- Adelebsen, Germany
- Osterburg, Germany

Wilamowice

- Dolní Benešov, Czech Republic
- Horná Súča, Slovakia
- Kisújszállás, Hungary
- Klanjec, Croatia
- Kloštar Ivanić, Croatia
- Kunerad, Slovakia
- Rajecké Teplice, Slovakia
- Trenčianske Teplice, Slovakia
- Županja, Croatia

Wilkowice

- Bziny, Slovakia
- Krásná, Czech Republic
- Likavka, Slovakia
- Lubiewo, Poland

Wisła

- Bully-les-Mines, France
- Čoka, Serbia
- Hukvaldy, Czech Republic
- Jablunkov, Czech Republic
- Jastarnia, Poland
- Rheinhausen, Germany
- Ružomberok, Slovakia

=== Wl–Wy ===
Władysławowo

- Lamstedt, Germany
- Maków Podhalański, Poland
- Scalea, Italy

Włocławek

- Bedford, England, United Kingdom
- Izmail, Ukraine
- Saint-Avold, France

Wodzisław Śląski

- Alanya, Turkey
- Artik, Armenia
- Gladbeck, Germany
- Karviná, Czech Republic
- Sallaumines, France
- Siret, Romania

Wolbrom

- Domaszék, Hungary
- Waltershausen, Germany

Wołomin

- Csepel (Budapest), Hungary
- Poděbrady, Czech Republic

Wołów

- Buchholz in der Nordheide, Germany
- Canteleu, France
- Milovice, Czech Republic

Wolsztyn

- Bad Bevensen, Germany
- Domont, France
- Lityn, Ukraine
- Lübben, Germany
- Mór, Hungary
- Neunkirchen, Germany
- Peel en Maas, Netherlands

Wrocław

- Batumi, Georgia
- Breda, Netherlands
- Charlotte, United States
- Dresden, Germany
- Guadalajara, Mexico
- Hradec Králové, Czech Republic
- Kaunas, Lithuania
- Kyiv, Ukraine
- Lille, France
- Lviv, Ukraine
- Oxford, England, United Kingdom
- Ramat Gan, Israel
- Reykjavík, Iceland
- Vienne, France
- Wiesbaden, Germany

Wronki

- Beverwijk, Netherlands
- Cookstown, Northern Ireland, United Kingdom
- Lentvaris (Trakai), Lithuania
- Plérin, France

Września

- Garbsen, Germany
- Nottingham, England, United Kingdom

Wschowa

- Šalčininkai, Lithuania

Wyszków

- Kohtla-Järve, Estonia
- Vyshhorod, Ukraine

== Z ==
=== Za ===
Zabierzów

- Camas, United States
- Hillsboro, United States
- Hruštín, Slovakia
- Krapkowice, Poland
- Morawica, Poland

Ząbkowice Śląskie

- Bran, Romania
- Červený Kostelec, Czech Republic
- Fontenay-aux-Roses, France
- Sławno, Poland
- Uchte, Germany
- Wiesloch, Germany

Żabno

- Bad Berka, Germany

Zabrze

- Essen, Germany
- Lund, Sweden
- Rivne, Ukraine
- Rotherham, England, United Kingdom
- Rovereto, Italy
- Sangerhausen, Germany
- Seclin, France
- Trnava, Slovakia
- Zahlé, Lebanon

Żagań

- Duns, Scotland, United Kingdom
- Netphen, Germany
- Ortrand, Germany
- Saint-Omer, France
- Teltow, Germany

Zakopane

- Bansko, Bulgaria
- Polonezköy (Beykoz), Turkey
- Poprad, Slovakia
- Saint-Dié-des-Vosges, France
- Siegen, Germany
- Sopot, Poland
- Stryi, Ukraine
- Vysoké Tatry, Slovakia

Zambrów

- Visaginas, Lithuania

Zamość

- Bardejov, Slovakia
- Fountain Hills, United States
- Loughborough, England, United Kingdom
- Lutsk, Ukraine
- Schwäbisch Hall, Germany
- Sighișoara, Romania
- Weimar, Germany
- Zhovkva, Ukraine

Żarów

- Lohmar, Germany
- Nymburk, Czech Republic
- Újfehértó, Hungary

Żary

- Gárdony, Hungary
- Longuyon, France
- Weißwasser, Germany

Zawadzkie

- Bockenem, Germany
- Chortkiv, Ukraine
- Dubnica nad Váhom, Slovakia
- Otrokovice, Czech Republic
- Uebigau-Wahrenbrück, Germany
- Vác, Hungary

Zawiercie

- Bornheim, Germany
- Dolný Kubín, Slovakia
- Ebensee, Austria
- Kamianets-Podilskyi, Ukraine
- Ponte Lambro, Italy
- Zsámbék, Hungary

=== Zb–Zi ===
Zbąszyń

- Brieskow-Finkenheerd, Germany
- Kłodzko (rural gmina), Poland
- Schleife, Germany
- Zbąszynek, Poland

Zbrosławice

- Brackenheim, Germany
- Castagnole delle Lanze, Italy
- Charnay-lès-Mâcon, France
- Tarnalelesz, Hungary

Zduńska Wola

- Pietrasanta, Italy
- Valmiera, Latvia
- Zarasai, Lithuania

Zdzieszowice

- Lipník nad Bečvou, Czech Republic

Zebrzydowice

- Petrovice u Karviné, Czech Republic

Zgierz

- Bischwiller, France
- Glauchau, Germany
- Hódmezővásárhely, Hungary
- Jihlava, Czech Republic
- Kežmarok, Slovakia
- Kupiškis, Lithuania
- Manevychi Raion, Ukraine
- Orzysz, Poland
- Supraśl, Poland

Zgorzelec

- Avion, France
- Görlitz, Germany
- Myrhorod, Ukraine
- Naousa, Greece

Ziębice

- Brighton, United States
- Ebreichsdorf, Austria
- Jaroměř, Czech Republic

Zielona Góra

- L'Aquila, Italy
- Bistriţa, Romania
- Cottbus, Germany
- Helmond, Netherlands
- Ivano-Frankivsk, Ukraine
- Kraljevo, Serbia
- Nitra, Slovakia
- Troyes, France
- Verden an der Aller, Germany
- Vitebsk, Belarus
- Wuxi, China
- Zittau, Germany

Zielonki

- Hersin-Coupigny, France
- Washougal, United States

=== Zl–Zy ===
Złocieniec

- Bad Segeberg, Germany
- Drawsko Pomorskie, Poland
- Koserow, Germany
- Pyrzyce, Poland

Złotoryja

- Buchach, Ukraine
- Mimoň, Czech Republic
- Pulsnitz, Germany
- Westerburg, Germany

Złotów

- Eggesin, Germany
- La Flèche, France
- Goole, England, United Kingdom
- Nyasvizh, Belarus
- Rathenow, Germany

Żmigród

- Bargteheide, Germany

Żnin

- Albertirsa, Hungary
- Birštonas, Lithuania
- Malacky, Slovakia
- Šalčininkai, Lithuania
- Veselí nad Moravou, Czech Republic

Żory

- Kamp-Lintfort, Germany
- Mezőkövesd, Hungary
- Pasvalys, Lithuania
- Montceau-les-Mines, France
- Tetiiv, Ukraine

Żukowo

- Balvi, Latvia
- Saint-Junien, France
- Świdnica (rural gmina), Poland
- Wendelstein, Germany

Żychlin

- Brody, Ukraine

Żyrardów

- Delčevo, North Macedonia
- Krásná Lípa, Czech Republic
- Lourmarin, France
- Tangshan, China
- Tryavna, Bulgaria

Żywiec

- Adur, England, United Kingdom
- Čadca, Slovakia
- Feldbach, Austria
- Gödöllő, Hungary
- Liptovský Mikuláš, Slovakia
- Opava, Czech Republic
- Riom, France
- Storuman, Sweden
- Szczytno, Poland
- Unterhaching, Germany
