= Tomasz Żyła =

Polish bobsledder

Personal information
- Nationality: Polish
- Born: 12 February 1967 (age 58); Kowary, Poland

Sport
- Sport: Bobsleigh

Tomasz Żyła (born 12 February 1967) is a Polish bobsledder. He competed at the 1998 Winter Olympics and the 2002 Winter Olympics.
