= Krzaczyna =

Neighbourhood of the town of Kowary, Poland

- Neighbourhood of Kowary
- Location within Poland
- Coordinates: 50°47′N 15°48′E
- Country: Poland
- Voivodeship: Lower Silesian
- County: Karkonosze
- Gmina/Town: Kowary
- Within town limits: 1959
- Time zone: UTC+1 (CET)
  - Summer (DST): UTC+2 (CEST)
- Vehicle registration: DJE

Krzaczyna [kʂaˈt͡ʂɨna] is a neighbourhood of Kowary, Poland, located in the western part of the town.

== History ==
During World War II, in 1940, the Germans converted the local yarn factory to arms production and established two forced labour camps there, one for civilians and one for Allied prisoners of war. In the former, the Germans imprisoned Czechs, the French, Luxembourgers and Jews since 1940, and in 1944 they also brought 50 Polish women from a transit camp in Pruszków, where they were imprisoned following the unsuccessful Warsaw Uprising. In the latter, the Germans imprisoned French, Italian and Soviet POWs. Also prisoners from a subcamp of the Gross-Rosen concentration camp in Kamienna Góra were used a slave labour in the factory. The forced labour camps were dissolved in 1945.

Krzaczyna was included within the town limits of Kowary as its new neighbourhood in 1959.
