= Malá Úpa =

- Municipality
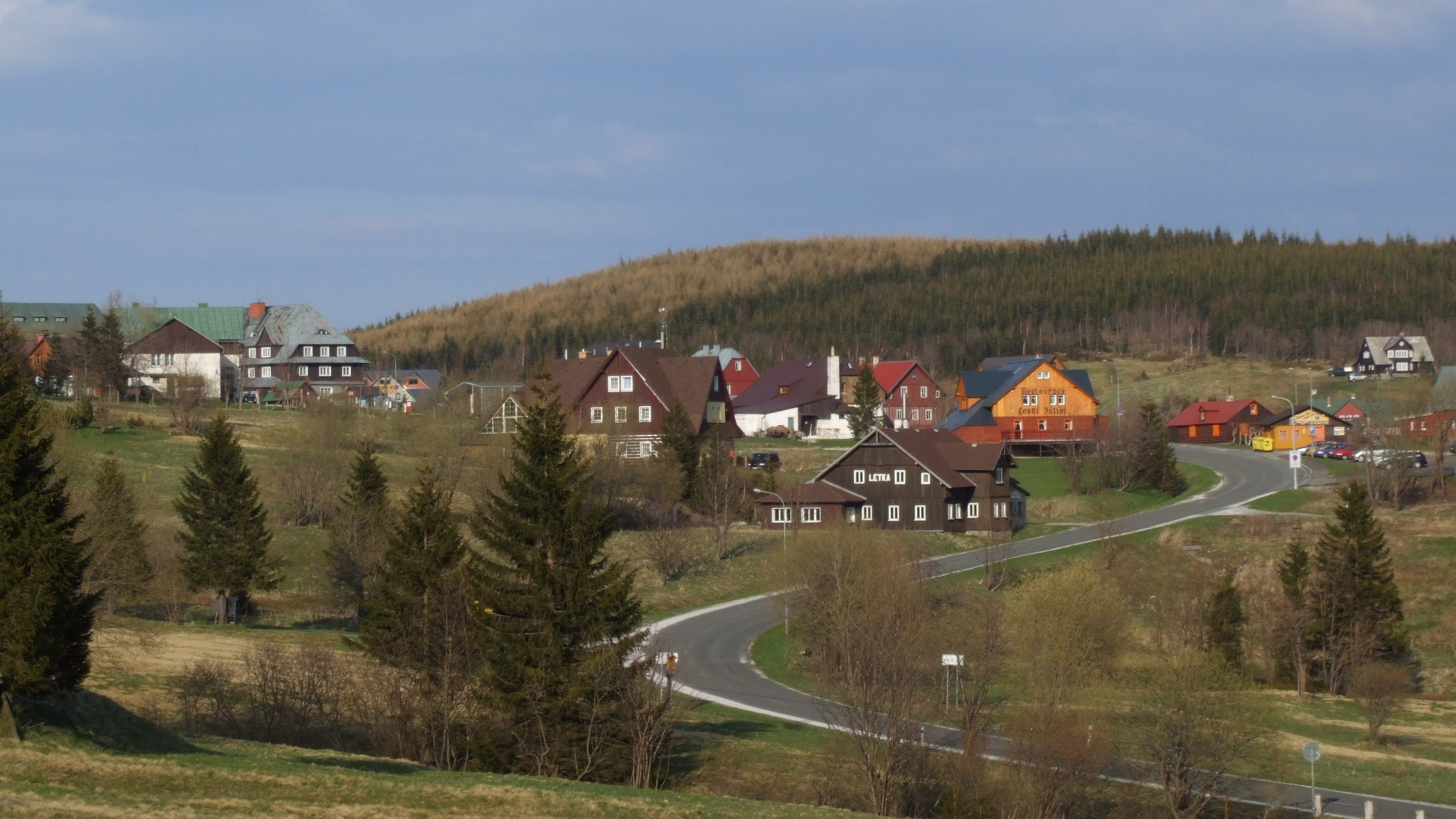
- General view

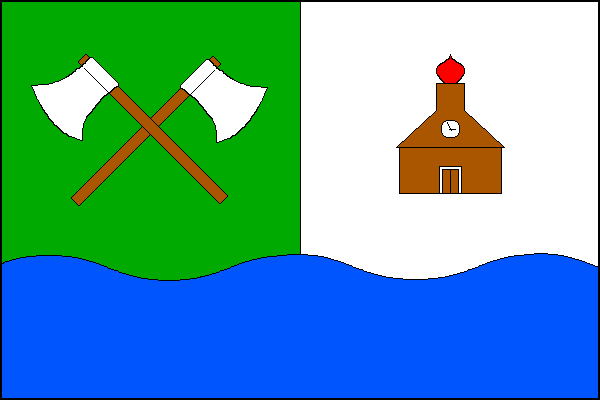
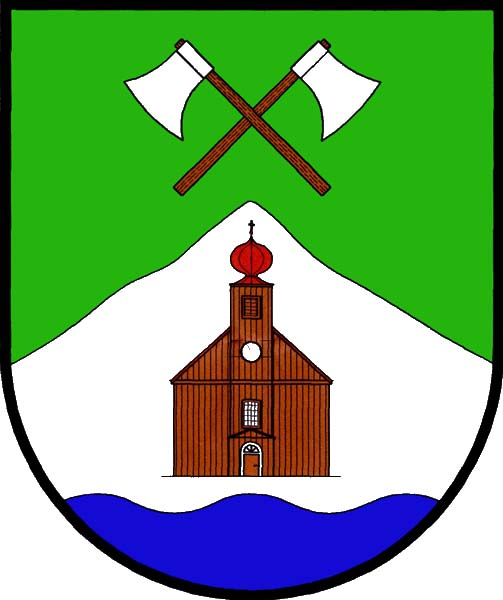
- Flag Coat of arms

- Location in the Czech Republic
- Coordinates: 50°43′26″N 15°48′50″E
- Country: Czech Republic
- Region: Hradec Králové
- District: Trutnov
- First mentioned: 1650

Area
  - Total: 26.67 km^{2} (10.30 sq mi)
- Elevation: 1,041 m (3,415 ft)

Population (2026-01-01)
  - Total: 148
  - Density: 5.55/km^{2} (14.4/sq mi)
- Time zone: UTC+1 (CET)
  - Summer (DST): UTC+2 (CEST)
- Postal code: 542 27
- Website: malaupa.cz

Malá Úpa (German: Kleinaupa) is a municipality in Trutnov District in the Hradec Králové Region of the Czech Republic. It has about 100 inhabitants.

== Administrative division ==
Malá Úpa consists of two municipal parts (in brackets population according to the 2021 census):

- Dolní Malá Úpa (80)
- Horní Malá Úpa (77)

== Etymology ==
The name Malá Úpa was transferred to the settlement for the Malá Úpa River. The name of the river means 'small Úpa'.

== Geography ==
Malá Úpa is located about 18 kilometres (11 mi) north of Trutnov and 57 km (35 mi) north of Hradec Králové, on the border with Poland. It lies in the Giant Mountains. The highest point is a contour line near the top of the Sněžka mountain at 1,600 m (5,249 ft) above sea level. The Malá Úpa River originates here and flows across the municipality.

== History ==
The Malá Úpa River was first mentioned under this name in 1537. The first settlement of the area began in 1566, when woodcutters from Tyrol, Carinthia and Styria came here. The area belonged to the Vrchlabí estate owned by Kryštof Gendorf, who initiated the logging. The first written mention of the village of Malá Úpa is from 1650. The municipality of Malá Úpa separated from the estate in 1748.

== Demographics ==
Historical population

Year	Pop.	±%
1869	1,101	—
1880	1,093	−0.7%
1890	1,153	+5.5%
1900	1,126	−2.3%
1910	1,106	−1.8%

Year	Pop.	±%
1921	1,001	−9.5%
1930	971	−3.0%
1950	614	−36.8%
1961	137	−77.7%
1970	137	+0.0%

Year	Pop.	±%
1980	113	−17.5%
1991	78	−31.0%
2001	137	+75.6%
2011	166	+21.2%
2021	157	−5.4%

Source: Censuses

== Transport ==
There are no railways or major roads passing through the municipality. On the Czech–Polish border is the Pomezní Boudy / Przełęcz Okraj road border crossing.

== Sights ==
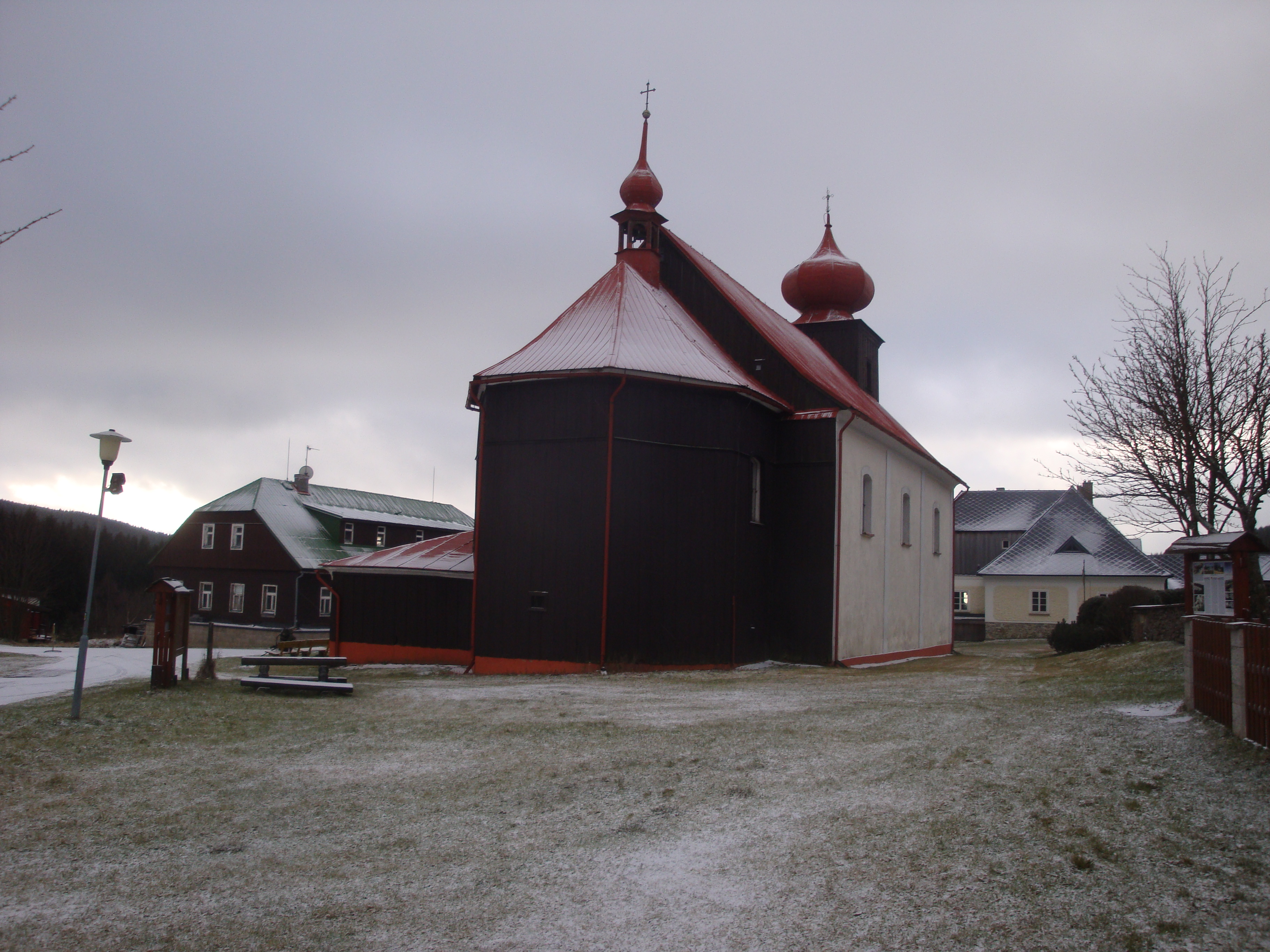
Church of Saints Peter and Paul

The most important monument of Malá Úpa is the Church of Saints Peter and Paul. It is a simple church, built in 1788–1799 and rebuilt after the fire in 1806.

== Twin towns – sister cities ==
Malá Úpa is twinned with:

- Kowary, Poland
