= Kowary =

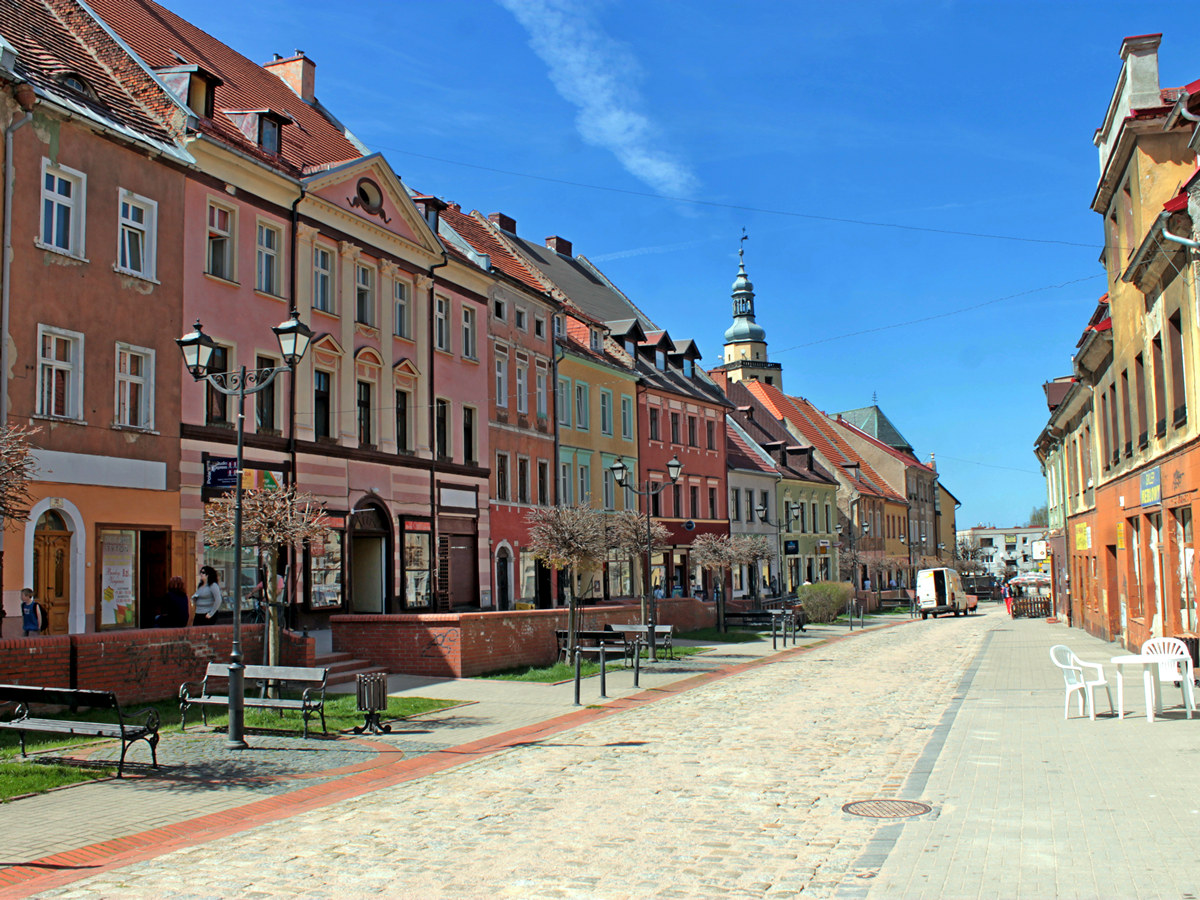
- Centre of town

- Flag Coat of arms

- Location within Poland
- Coordinates: 50°47′30″N 15°50′0″E
- Country: Poland
- Voivodeship: Lower Silesian
- County: Karkonosze
- Gmina: Kowary (urban gmina)
- Town rights: 1513

Area
  - Total: 37.39 km^{2} (14.44 sq mi)

Population (2019-06-30)
  - Total: 10,869
  - Density: 290.7/km^{2} (752.9/sq mi)
- Time zone: UTC+1 (CET)
  - Summer (DST): UTC+2 (CEST)
- Vehicle registration: DJE
- Website: http://www.kowary.pl

Kowary [kɔˈvarɨ] (German: Schmiedeberg im Riesengebirge) is a town in Karkonosze County, Lower Silesian Voivodeship, in south-western Poland, with a population of around 11,000. The town is famed for its sanatoriums and a miniature park displaying architectural monuments of the Lower Silesian region.

== History ==
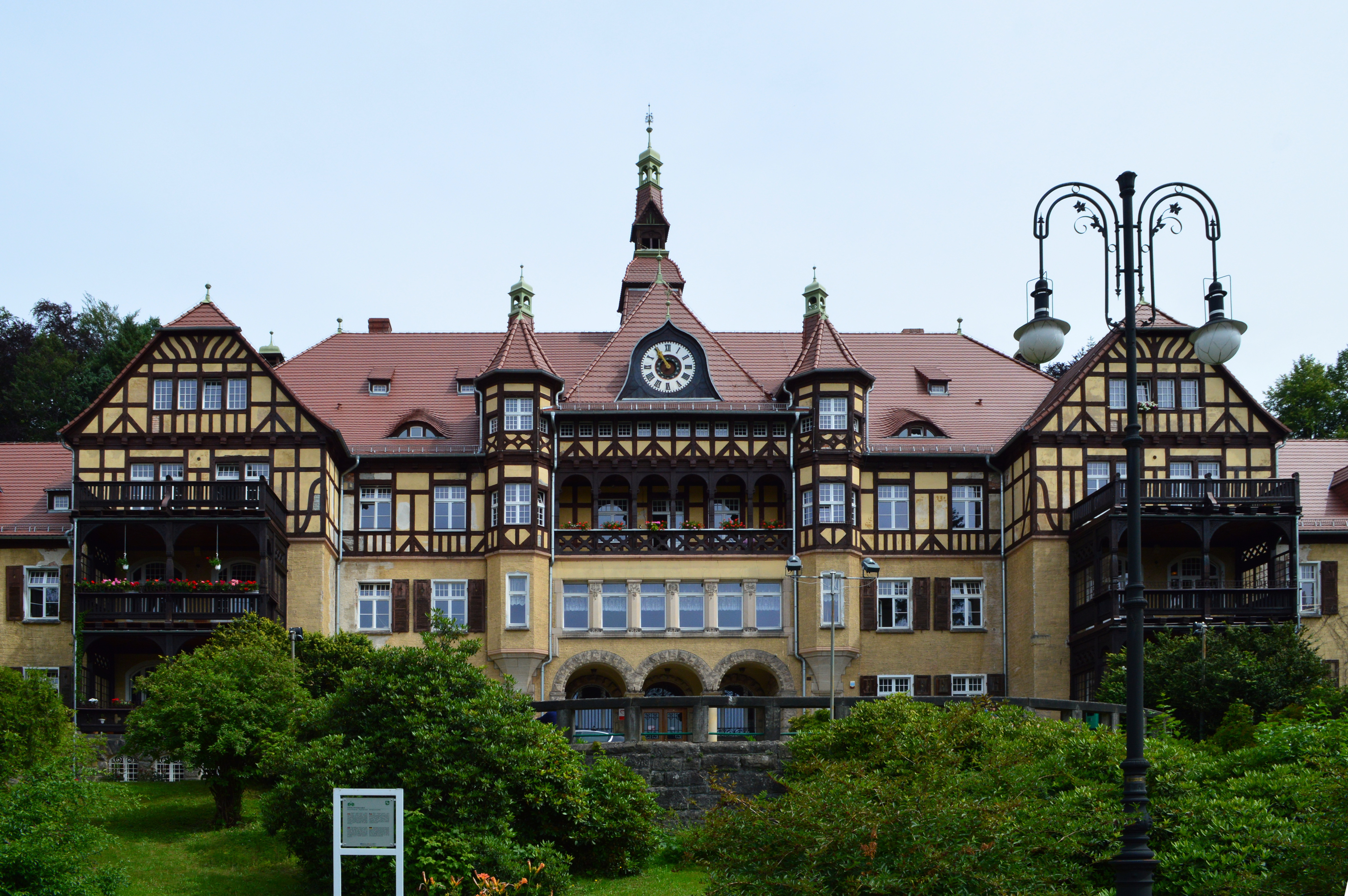
Sanatorium in the district of Wysoka Łąka, Kowary

The official site of the town dates the history of Kowary dates to 1148 when semi-legendary miner Laurentius Angelus mined iron ore in the location on the behalf of Polish duke Bolesław IV the Curly, ten years later on the orders of the Polish ruler a mining settlement was founded in the area, the official page of the town also states that the Kowary miners took part in Battle of Legnica in 1241. According to the Geographical Dictionary of the Kingdom of Poland from the 1880s, the mining settlement already existed in the 12th century. Other possible date of the start of the town is 1355 and connects it to Ostsiedlung. Publications published in German Empire disputed the origin of Kowary and called it 'Schmedewerk'. In 1355 year Duke Bolko II the Small, the grandson of the Polish king Władysław I the Elbow-high, the last independent Silesian Piast, granted mining privileges to the local miners. As a mining center the settlement received several privileges and was seat of a wójt since 1368. It remained part of the Polish Duchy of Świdnica and Jawor until 1392, afterwards it was part of the Bohemian Crown under the Holy Roman Empire.

Since 1401 the village belonged to the possessions of the Schaffgotsch family. An accord with neighbouring Hirschberg (Jelenia Góra) in 1454 elevated the settlement above the status of a village, it wasn't until 1513 however that Casper Schaffgotsch acquired the municipal law from Bohemian king Vladislaus II against the opposition of Hirschberg. Mining flourished until the Thirty Years' War, when the town was destroyed in 1633. The main export partner was Poland, with record trade in 1558, it was also famous for its gunsmiths, with Polish king Sigismund II Augustus ordering 2000 gun barrels (later German publications claimed it was only 200).

After the war veil weaving became more and more important for the town, whereas mining diminished. In the early 18th century the town became one of the biggest veil trading places in Silesia with trade relations to Bohemia, Italy, Spain, Russia and North America.

Schmiedeberg remained in possession of the Schaffgotsch family until 1634. In the 16th century the population adopted the Protestant faith. Hans Ulrich von Schaffgotsch was arrested as a follower of Albrecht Wallenstein the town came under Imperial custody. In 1639 the emperor sold the town to Bohemian count Heřman of Czernin and his family kept Schmiedeberg until Prussian takeover of Silesia. After the Peace of Westphalia (1648) the town experienced Counter-Reformation. The Protestants could now practice their faith only at the church of peace in Jawor and later in Hirschberg and Kamienna Góra (then Landeshut).

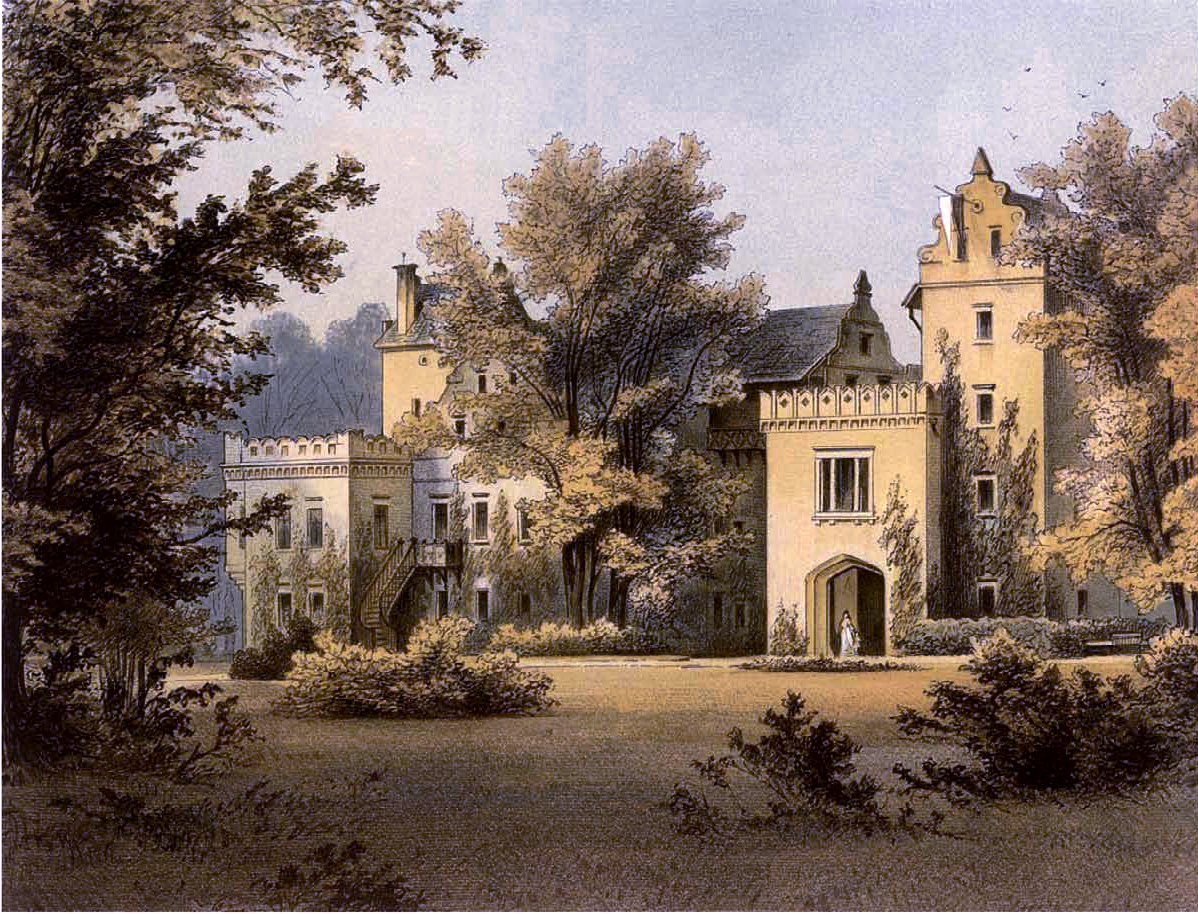
19th-century view of the Nowy Dwór Palace

When Prussia annexed majority of Silesia in 1742, Prussian king Frederick II immediately sold the possessions to the town, which thereby became sovereign. Prussian conquering also meant a relief for local Protestants – they received their own church. Nevertheless, an economic decline followed. Aid by the Prussian king, the settling of Saxon damask weavers, couldn't stop the downturn. Only the Industrialisation, beginning around 1850, led to a recovery of the local economy. In the 19th century the Polish magnate Radziwiłł and Czartoryski families were in possession of the Ciszyca Palace and Park in the northern part of today's Kowary. In 1882 the town received a rail connection to Hirschberg (Jelenia Góra), and then in 1895 to Karpacz, which further strengthened the economy.

During World War II, Nazi Germany operated multiple slave labour camps in the town, including three camps for Polish women at local factories, a camp for Polish men at a local mine, a camp for Jews at a sanatorium, three camps for French POWs and a camp for Italian POWs from the Stalag VIII-A POW camp. The town was not destroyed during the war and after the defeat of Germany in 1945, it became again part of Poland. The German population fled or was expelled in accordance with the Potsdam Agreement. The town was resettled by Poles from the Eastern Borderlands, annexed by the Soviet Union.

In 1959, town limits of Kowary were expanded by including the village of Krzaczyna.

== Sights ==
Kowary is a town with rich historical architecture, which includes:

- town hall
- Gothic-Baroque Holy Name of Mary church
- former Franciscan monastery
- Nowy Dwór palace
- Ciszyca Palace and Park with the Radziwiłłówka Hill
- Wysoka Łąka hospital
- Bukowiec hospital
- numerous historic townhouses and villas

The Lower Silesia Monuments Miniature Park is located in Kowary, and there are also underground tourist routes in the former uranium ore mines.

== Notable people ==
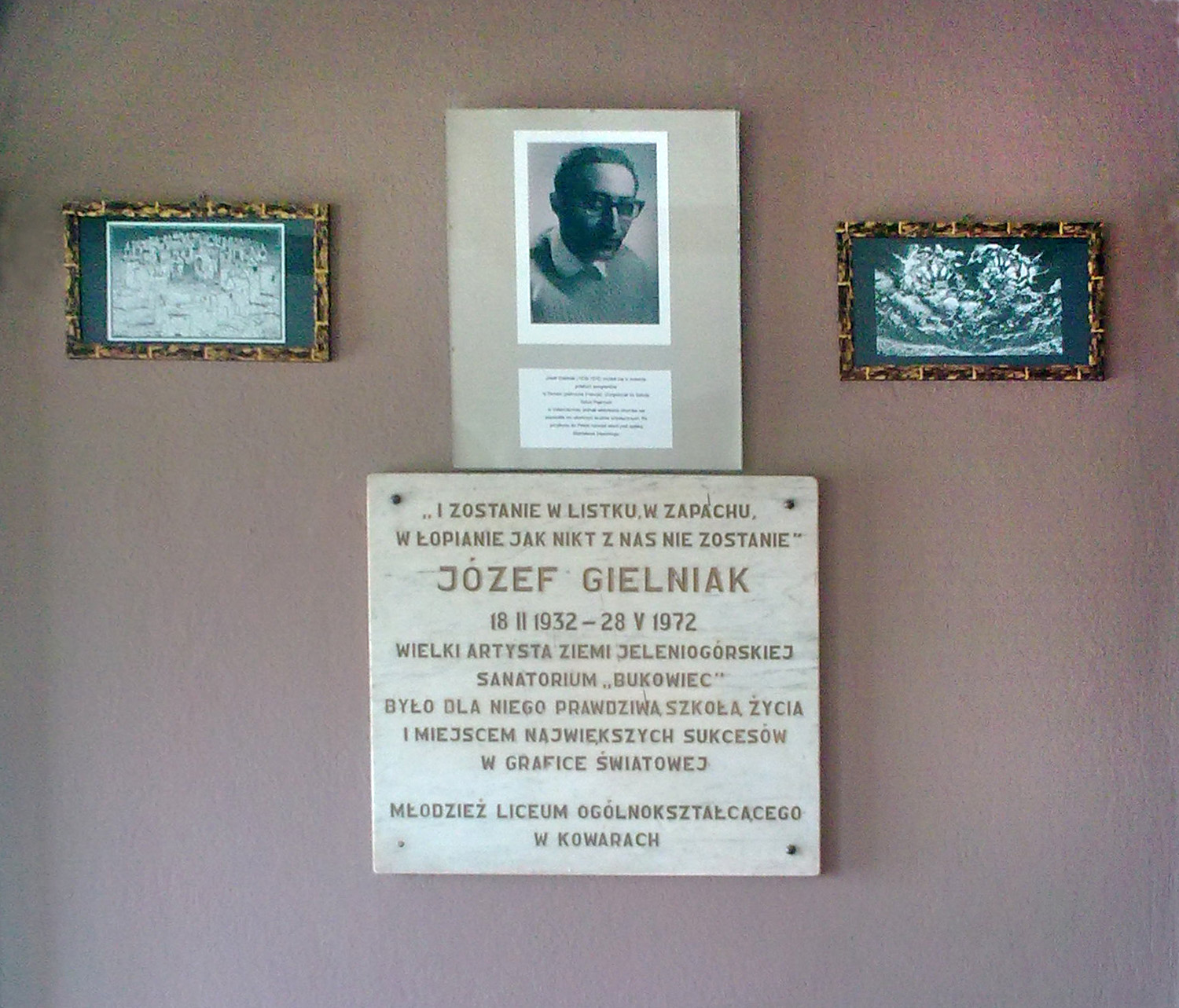
Memorial plaque to Józef Gielniak in the Bukowiec hospital

- Werner von Rheinbaben (1878–1975), German diplomat
- Friedrich-August Schack (1892–1968), German General
- Andrzej Kupczyk (born 1948), athlete
- Tomasz Żyła (born 1967), bobsledder
- Dawid Kupczyk (born 1977), bobsledder
- Mateusz Luty (born 1990), bobsledder
- Wojciech Chmielewski (born 1995), luger

== Twin towns – sister cities ==
Kowary is twinned with:

- Černý Důl, Czech Republic
- Dvůr Králové nad Labem, Czech Republic
- Kamień Pomorski, Poland
- Malá Úpa, Czech Republic
- Schönau-Berzdorf, Germany
- Terebovlia, Ukraine
- Vrchlabí, Czech Republic
- Vyshnivets, Ukraine
- Žacléř, Czech Republic

== Gallery ==
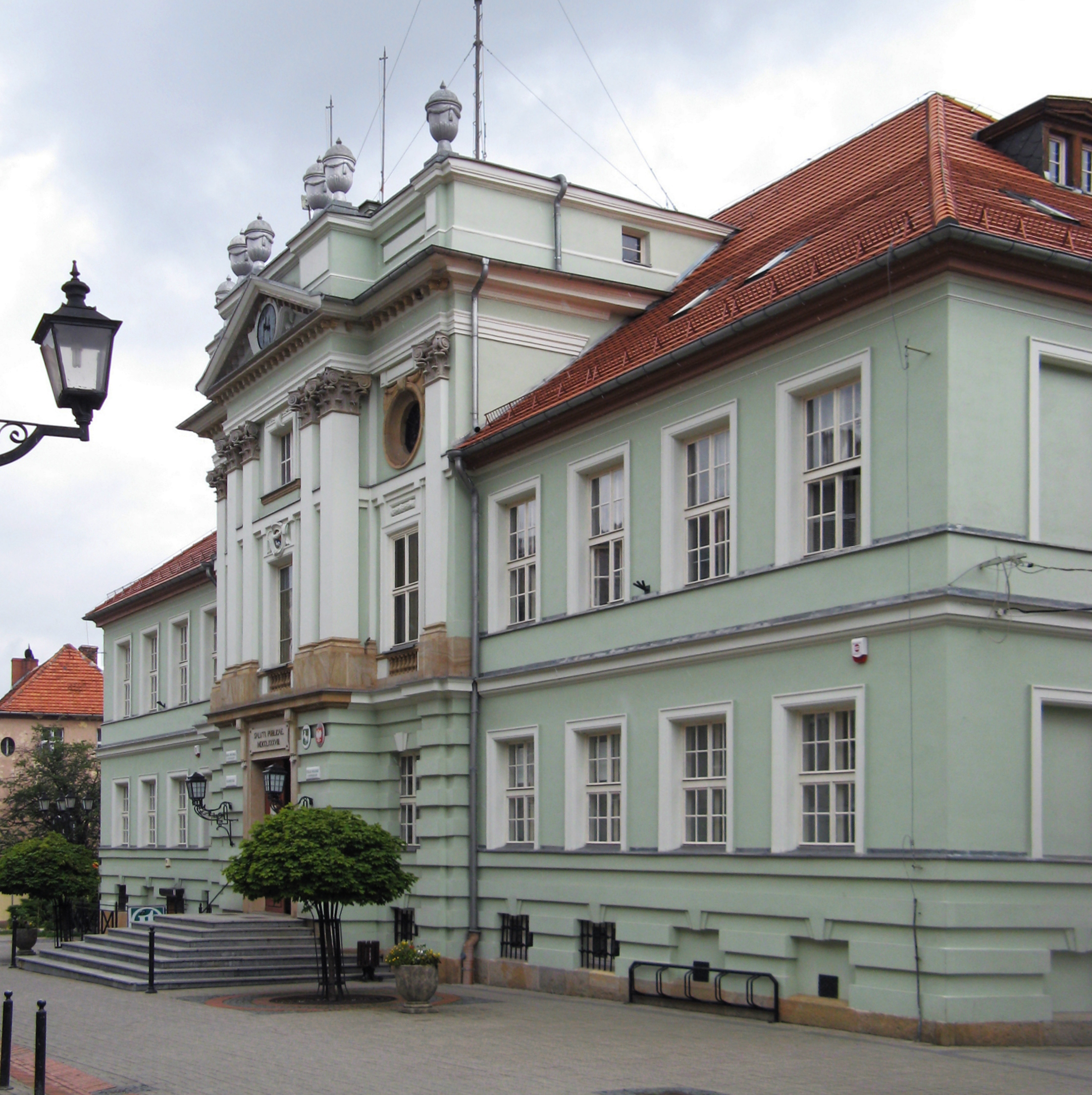
Town hall

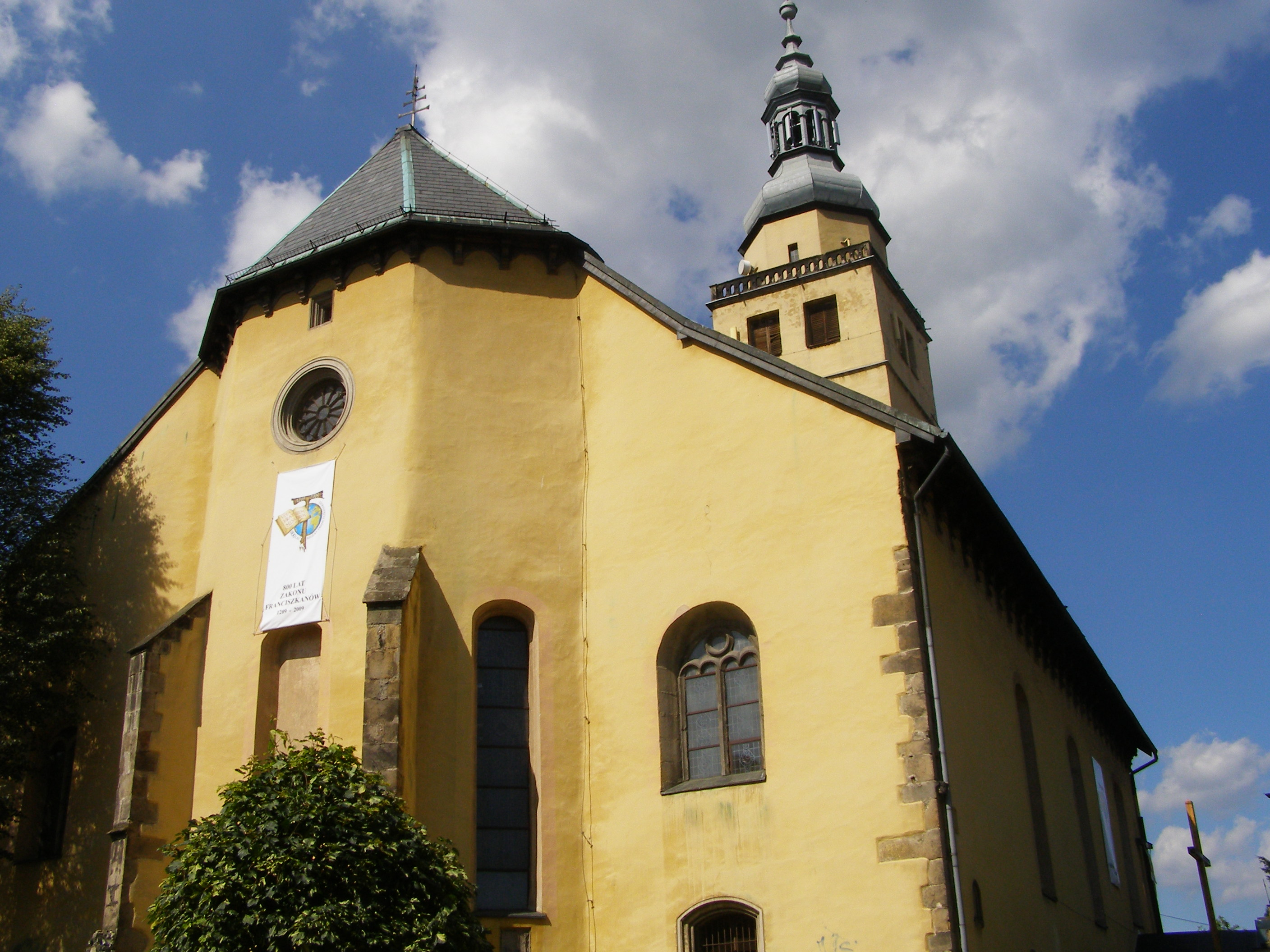
Holy Name of Mary church

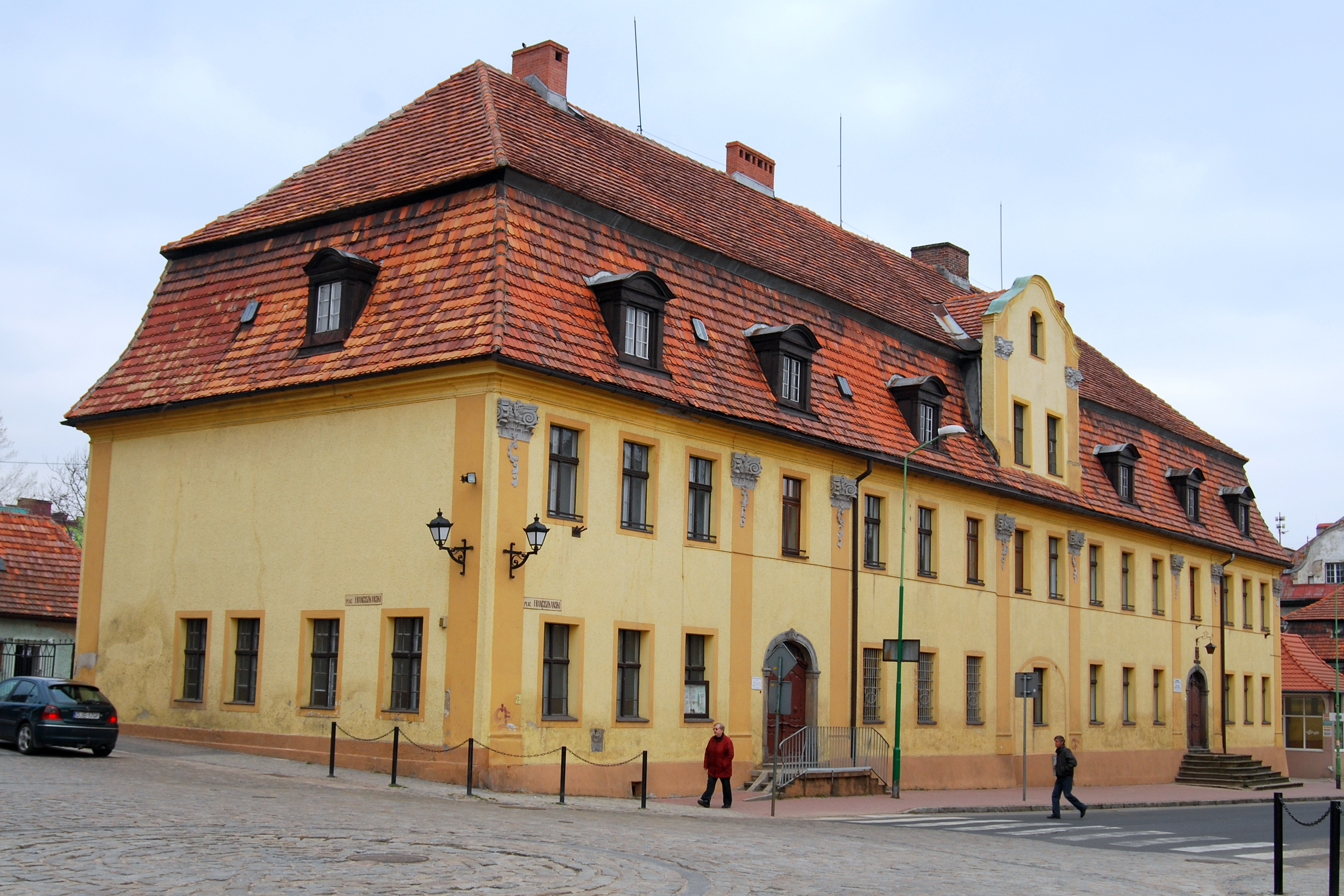
Former Franciscan monastery

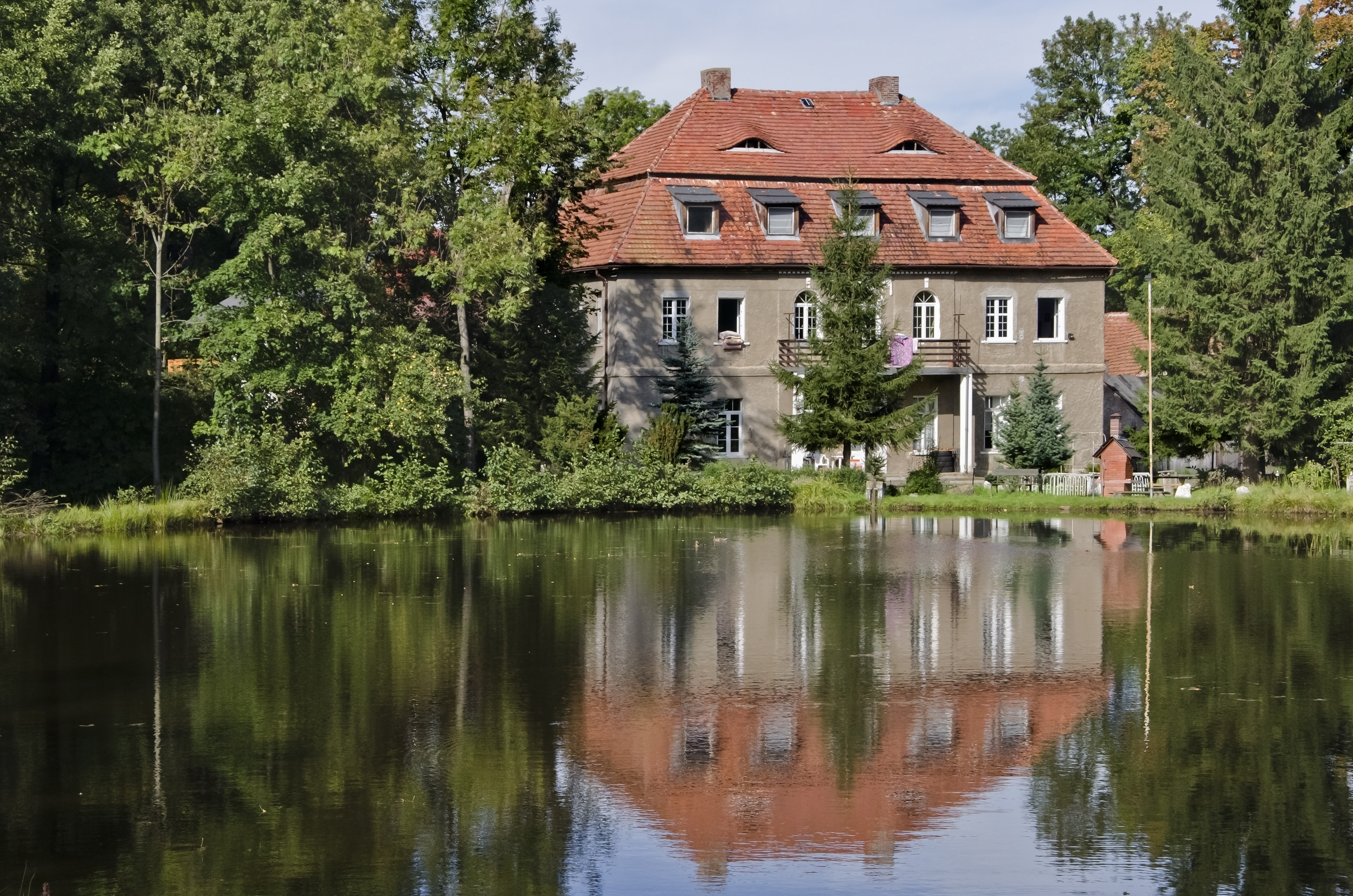
Ciszyca Palace

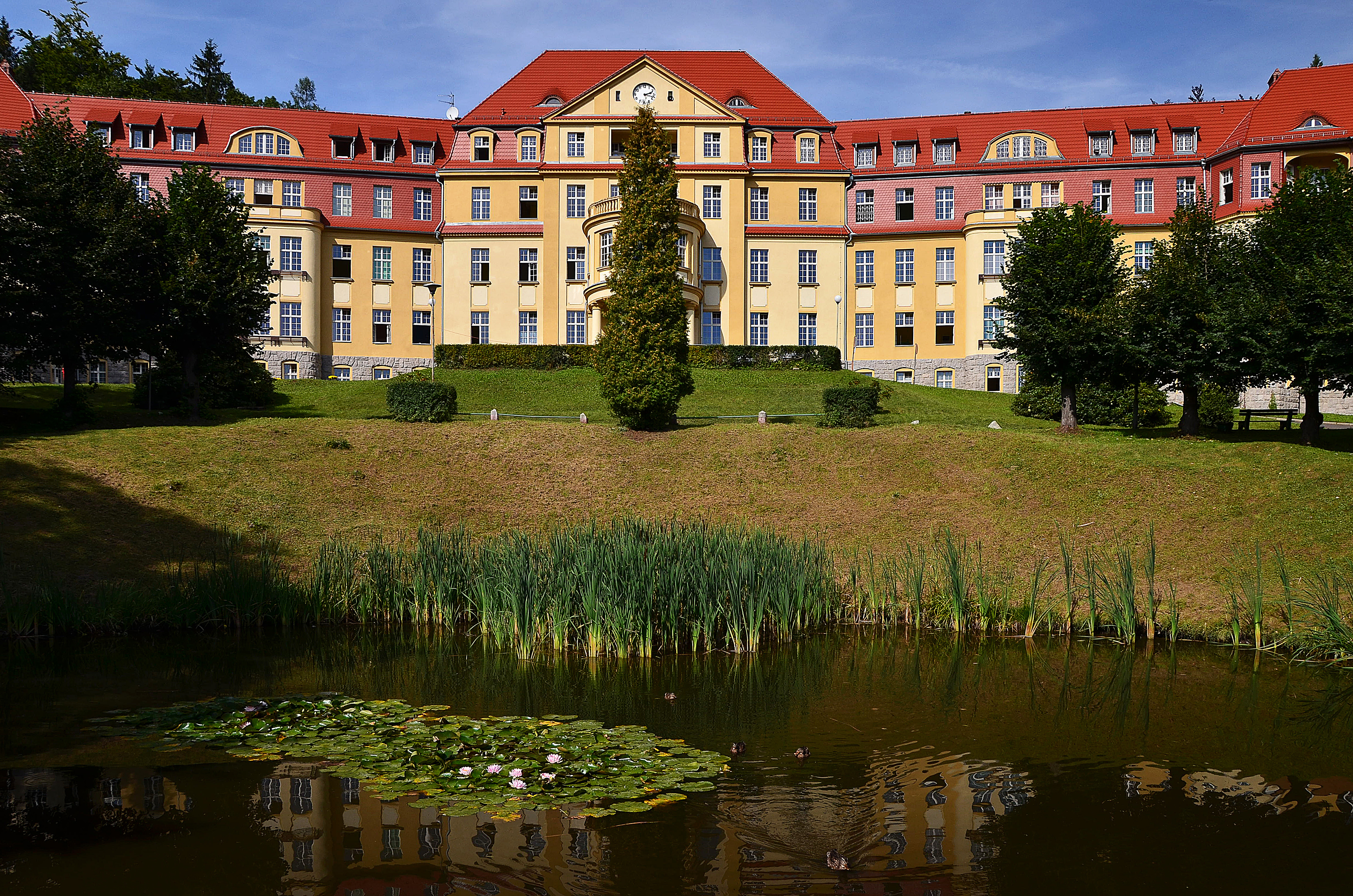
Bukowiec hospital

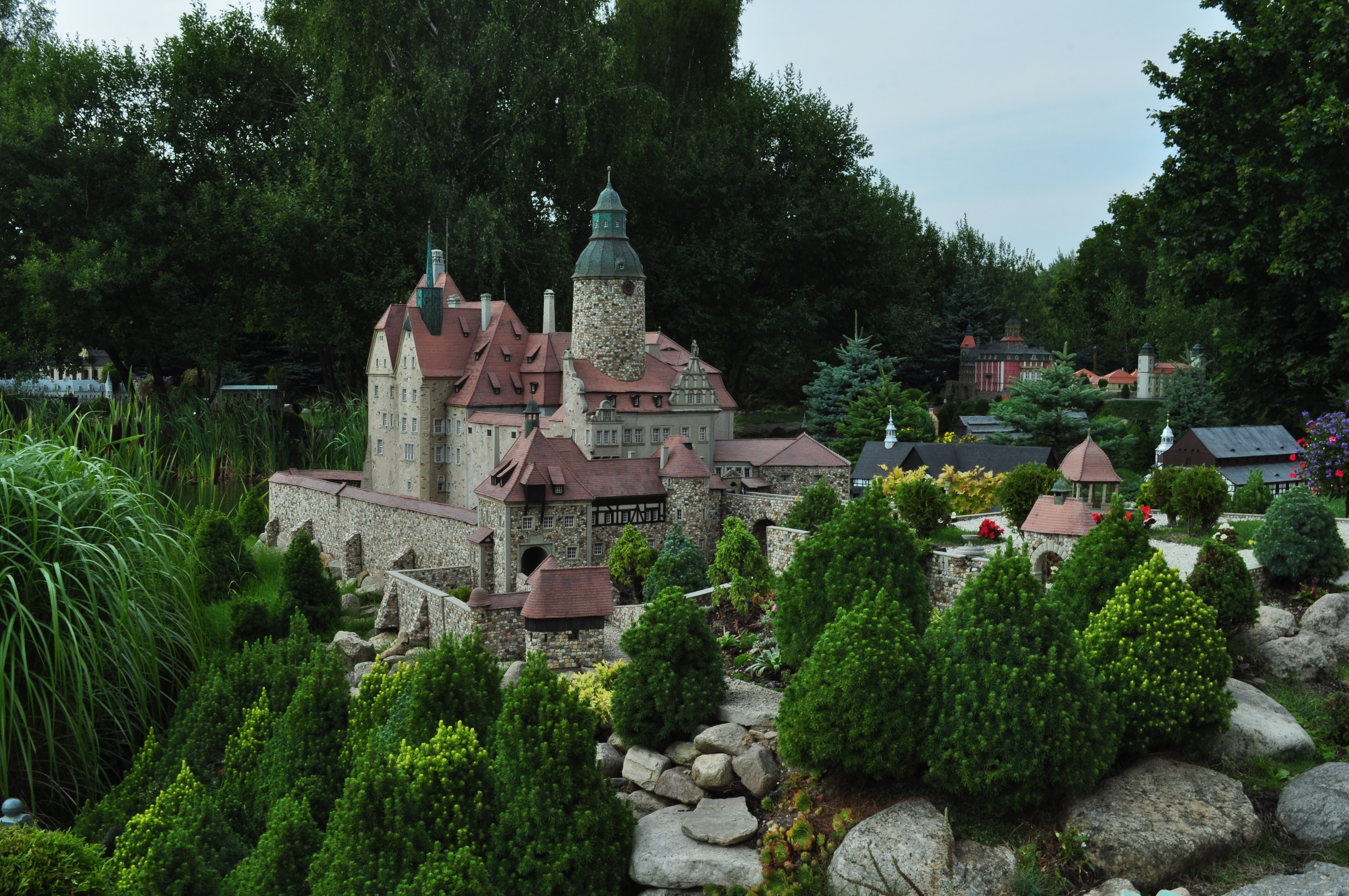
Lower Silesia Monuments Miniature Park
