= Černý Důl =

- Market town
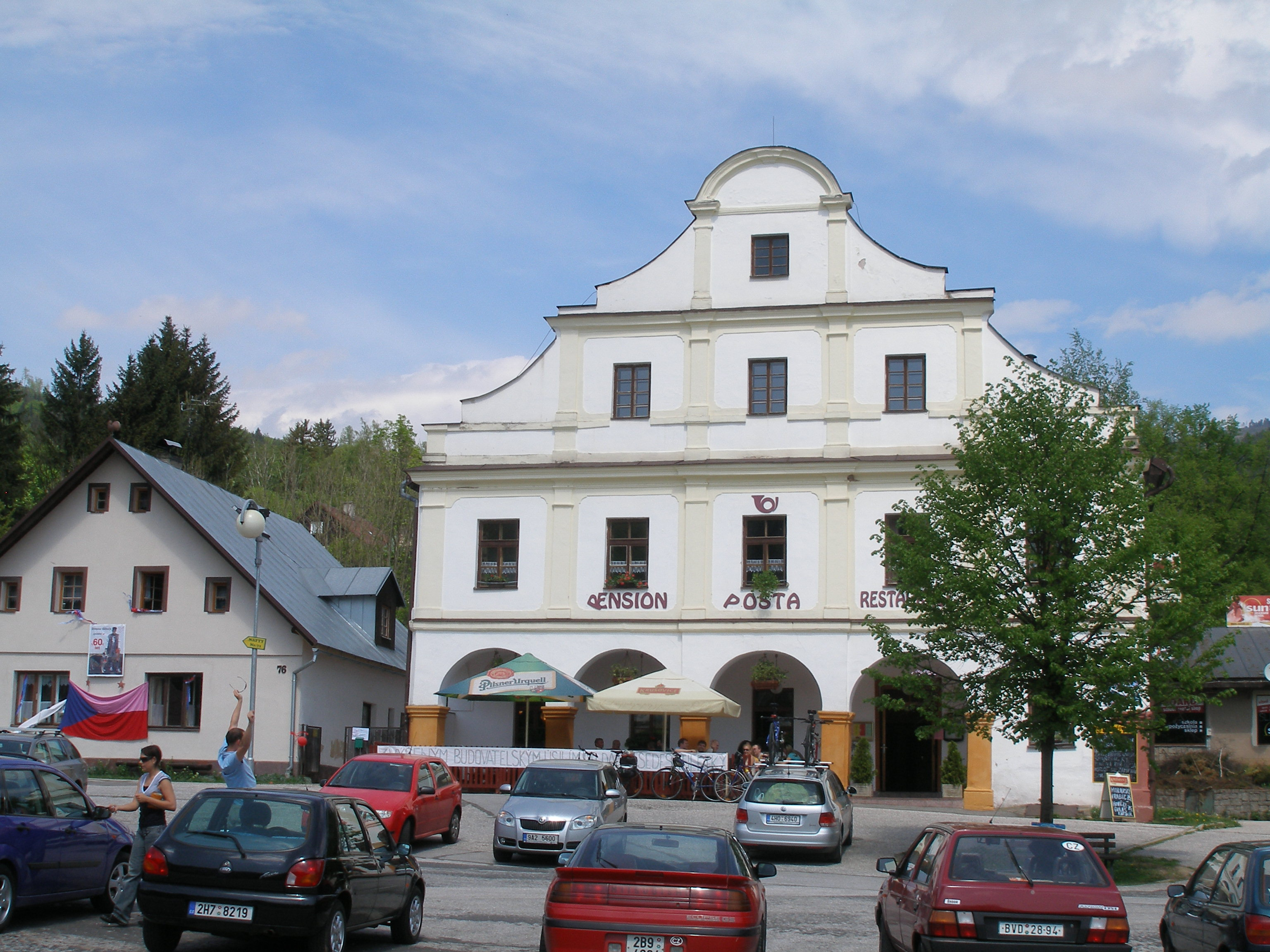
- Town square with Hotel Pošta

- Flag Coat of arms

- Location in the Czech Republic
- Coordinates: 50°38′6″N 15°42′38″E
- Country: Czech Republic
- Region: Hradec Králové
- District: Trutnov
- First mentioned: 1556

Area
  - Total: 22.16 km^{2} (8.56 sq mi)
- Elevation: 684 m (2,244 ft)

Population (2026-01-01)
  - Total: 674
  - Density: 30.4/km^{2} (78.8/sq mi)
- Time zone: UTC+1 (CET)
  - Summer (DST): UTC+2 (CEST)
- Postal codes: 543 44, 543 72
- Website: www.cernydul.cz

Černý Důl (Czech pronunciation: [ˈtʃɛrniː ˈduːl]; German: Schwarzenthal) is a market town in Trutnov District in the Hradec Králové Region of the Czech Republic. It has about 700 inhabitants. It lies in the Giant Mountains.

== Administrative division ==
Černý Důl consists of three municipal parts (in brackets population according to the 2021 census):

- Černý Důl (334)
- Čistá v Krkonoších (274)
- Fořt (110)

== Etymology ==
The name translates as 'black valley' or 'black mine' from Czech. It probably refers to its location in deep (black) forests, when it was founded.

== Geography ==
Černý Důl is located about 15 kilometres (9 mi) northwest of Trutnov and 47 km (29 mi) north of Hradec Králové. It lies in the Giant Mountains. The highest point is located on the slopes of the mountain Černá hora at 1,272 m (4,173 ft) above sea level. The northern half of the municipal territory lies in the Krkonoše National Park. The Čistá River originates here and creates a valley, in which the villages are situated.

== History ==
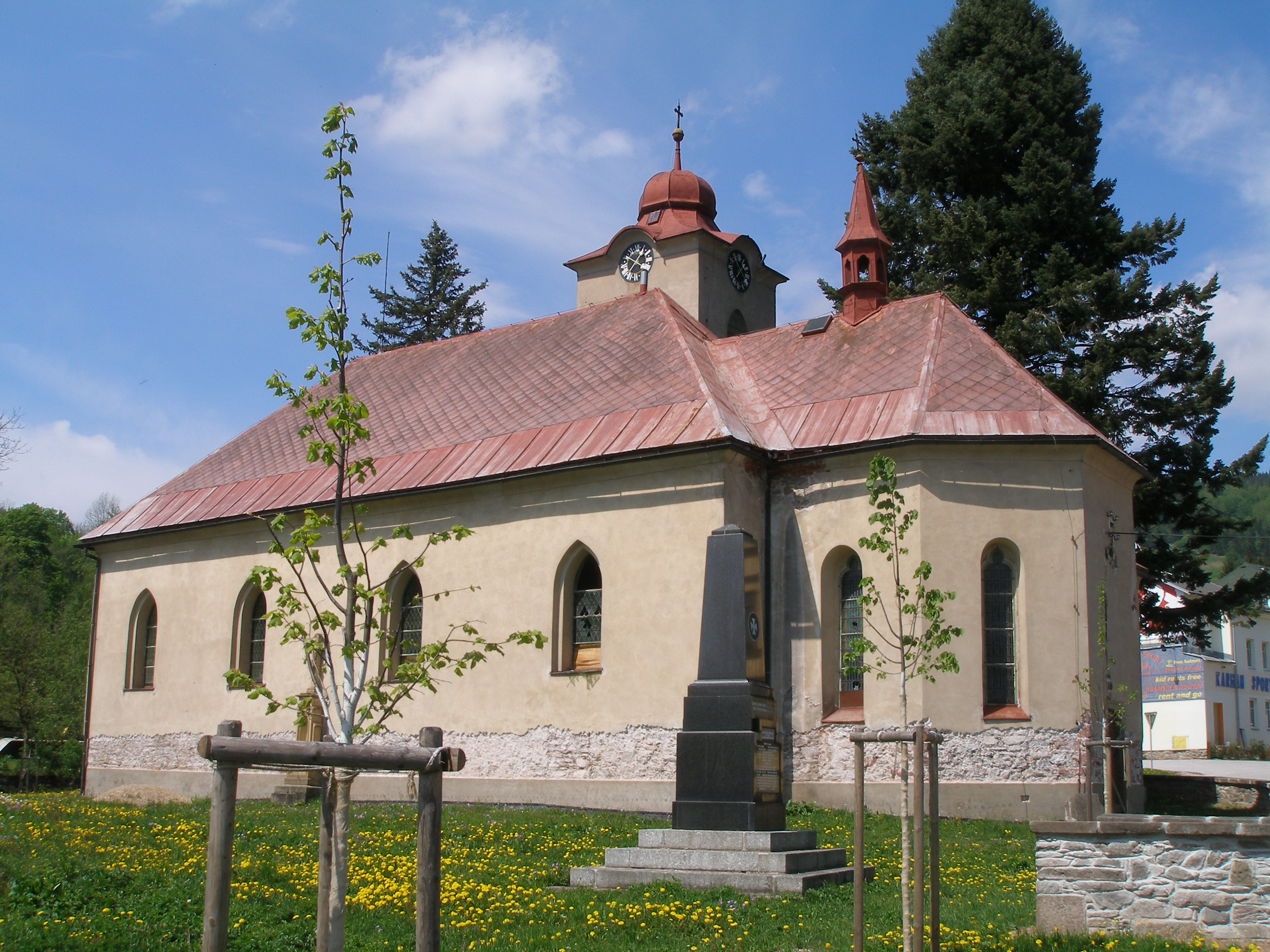
Church of Saint Michael the Archangel

The first written mention about iron ore mining in the area of today's Černý Důl is from 1383. The estate was purchased by Kryštof Gendorf in 1533. In that time, the area was formed by three parts: Nová Ves village, settlement of Gottes Hilf, and grouping of huts called III. horský díl. The oldest was Nová Ves, which was first mentioned in 1489. Gottes Hilf established near Nová Ves nad named after one of mines. It was first mentioned in 1556, when a chapel was built here.

In 1564, Gottes Hilf was promoted to a market town with right of a free mining town and renamed Černý Důl. In 1607, the chapel was rebuilt and extended to the Church of Saint Michael the Archangel. After the mining ended, the population had to reorientate to linen making, spinning, agriculture and livestock, as the land consisted mostly of mountain pastures. In the 18th century, limestone began to be mined here.

== Demographics ==
Historical population

Year	Pop.	±%
1869	2,506	—
1880	2,301	−8.2%
1890	2,274	−1.2%
1900	2,195	−3.5%
1910	2,107	−4.0%

Year	Pop.	±%
1921	1,931	−8.4%
1930	2,046	+6.0%
1950	1,706	−16.6%
1961	1,177	−31.0%
1970	1,015	−13.8%

Year	Pop.	±%
1980	929	−8.5%
1991	778	−16.3%
2001	759	−2.4%
2011	750	−1.2%
2021	718	−4.3%

Source: Censuses

== Transport ==
The I/14 road (the section from Liberec to Trutnov) runs through the southern part of the municipal territory.

== Sport ==
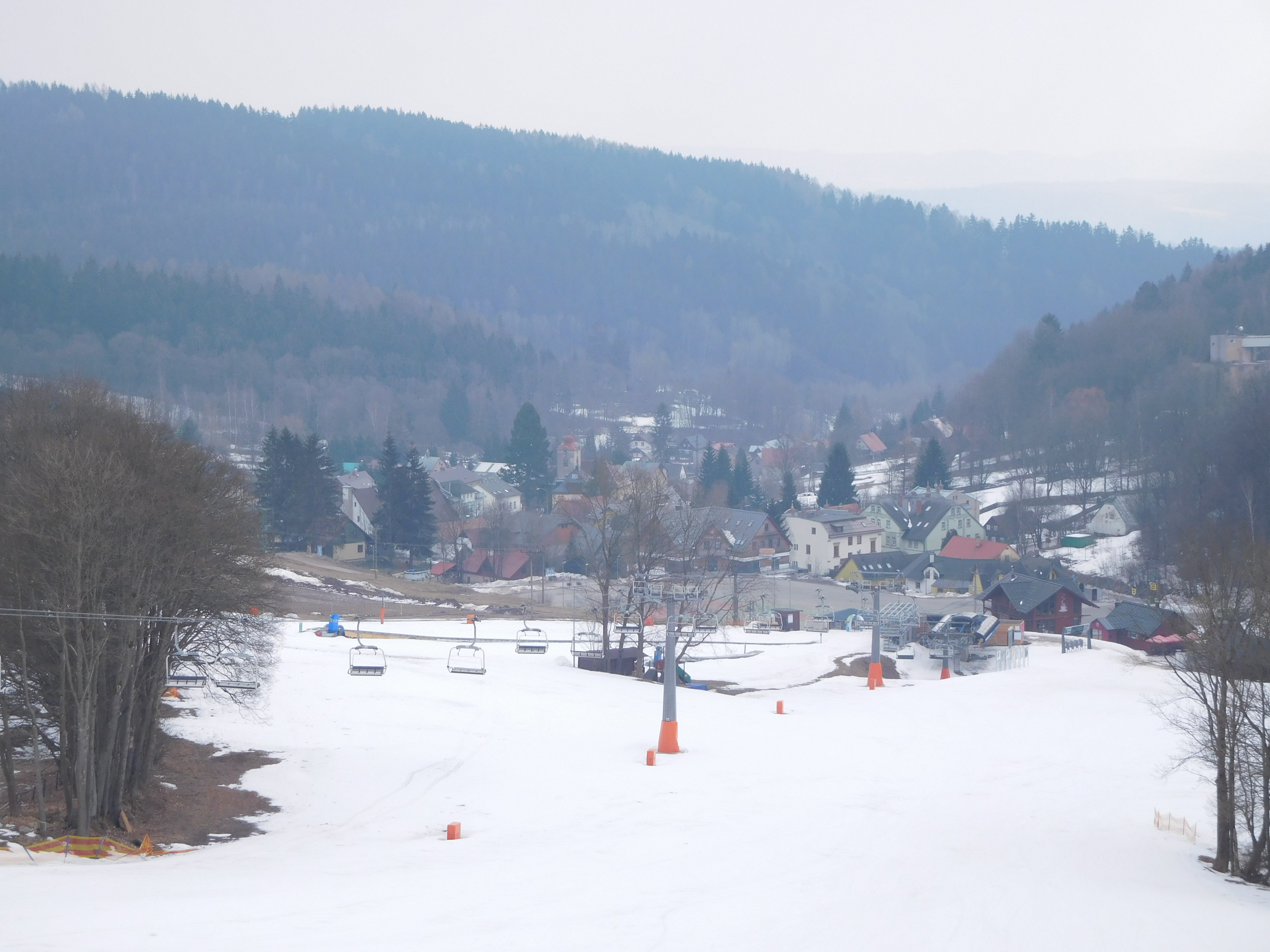
View of Černý Důl from a ski slope

Černý Důl is known as a ski resort with several slopes with lifts.

== Sights ==
The main landmark of Černý Důl is the Church of Saint Michael the Archangel. It was built in the Renaissance style in 1556.

Among the most valuable buildings of the town is Hotel Pošta. It is a late Baroque house from the second half of the 18th century, located on the town square. It still serves as a hotel and restaurant.

The Church of the Holy Trinity is located in Fořt. It was built in 1606 and completely rebuilt in the Baroque style in 1775. Its current form is the result of the Rococo restoration in 1902.

The Fořt Castle was originally a Renaissance fortress, rebuilt in 1597 into a small aristocratic residence. Later it was rebuilt and extended in the Baroque and Neo-Renaissance styles. Today the castle is privately owned and inaccessible.

== Twin towns – sister cities ==
Černý Důl is twinned with:

- Kowary, Poland
