= Biathlon World Championships 2024 – Women's individual =

Women's individual at the Biathlon World Championships 2024
- Venue: Vysočina Arena
- Location: Nové Město na Moravě, Czech Republic
- Dates: 13 February
- Competitors: 92 from 29 nations
- Winning time: 40:02.9

Medalists
gold medal	Lisa Vittozzi	Italy
silver medal	Janina Hettich-Walz	Germany
bronze medal	Julia Simon	France

The Women's individual competition at the Biathlon World Championships 2024 was held on 13 February 2024.

Hanna Öberg was the defending champion but she did not defend her title, finishing the competition in 16th place.

Lisa Vittozzi from Italy became the new world champion after winning her first individual gold medal. Janina Hettich-Walz from Germany took silver, winning her first individual world championship medal. The bronze was won by Julia Simon from France, who had won gold medals in all previous competitions at this world championship.

== Results ==
The race was started at 17:10.

Rank	Bib	Name	Nationality	Penalties (P+S+P+S)	Time	Deficit
1st place, gold medalist(s)	10	Lisa Vittozzi	Italy	0 (0+0+0+0)	40:02.9	-
2nd place, silver medalist(s)	29	Janina Hettich-Walz	Germany	0 (0+0+0+0)	40:23.4	+20.5
3rd place, bronze medalist(s)	16	Julia Simon	France	1 (0+0+0+1)	40:32.5	+29.6
4	34	Selina Grotian	Germany	0 (0+0+0+0)	41:04.0	+1:01.1
5	4	Vanessa Voigt	Germany	0 (0+0+0+0)	41:09.1	+1:06.2
6	14	Lou Jeanmonnot	France	1 (0+0+0+1)	41:13.5	+1:10.6
7	25	Justine Braisaz-Bouchet	France	3 (0+2+0+1)	41:28.7	+1:25.8
8	63	Khrystyna Dmytrenko	Ukraine	0 (0+0+0+0)	42:13.0	+2:10.1
9	49	Mona Brorsson	Sweden	1 (0+0+0+1)	42:13.6	+2:10.7
10	56	Linn Persson	Sweden	1 (0+0+0+1)	42:19.6	+2:16.7
11	23	Deedra Irwin	United States	1 (1+0+0+0)	42:57.3	+2:54.4
12	61	Jessica Jislová	Czech Republic	1 (0+1+0+0)	43:03.9	+3:01.0
13	50	Regina Ermits	Estonia	2 (1+1+0+0)	43:08.6	+3:05.7
14	13	Dorothea Wierer	Italy	2 (1+0+0+1)	43:11.4	+3:08.5
15	18	Franziska Preuß	Germany	2 (1+0+0+1)	43:11.5	+3:08.6
16	12	Hanna Öberg	Sweden	3 (1+2+0+0)	43:15.7	+3:12.8
17	20	Lena Häcki-Groß	Switzerland	3 (1+1+0+1)	43:26.3	+3:23.4
18	11	Lotte Lie	Belgium	2 (0+1+0+1)	43:29.9	+3:27.0
19	67	Anna Gandler	Austria	2 (0+1+0+1)	43:36.3	+3:33.4
20	3	Markéta Davidová	Czech Republic	3 (0+1+1+1)	43:37.1	+3:34.2
21	36	Samuela Comola	Italy	1 (0+1+0+0)	43:38.0	+3:35.1
22	5	Lisa Theresa Hauser	Austria	2 (0+1+0+1)	43:39.3	+3:36.4
23	28	Suvi Minkkinen	Finland	2 (0+0+1+1)	44:05.6	+4:02.7
24	57	Galina Vishnevskaya-Sheporenko	Kazakhstan	0 (0+0+0+0)	44:10.0	+4:07.1
25	27	Anna Magnusson	Sweden	4 (1+1+1+1)	44:27.1	+4:24.2
26	91	Anna Kryvonos	Ukraine	1 (0+0+0+1)	44:27.3	+4:24.4
27	7	Ingrid Landmark Tandrevold	Norway	3 (0+3+0+0)	44:32.2	+4:29.3
28	47	Anastasiya Merkushyna	Ukraine	3 (0+0+1+2)	44:38.2	+4:35.3
29	22	Juni Arnekleiv	Norway	3 (1+1+1+0)	44:39.9	+4:37.0
30	2	Elvira Öberg	Sweden	4 (0+1+1+2)	44:43.1	+4:40.2
31	33	Ekaterina Avvakumova	South Korea	2 (0+0+2+0)	44:43.7	+4:40.8
32	30	Gilonne Guigonnat	France	3 (0+2+0+1)	44:44.4	+4:41.5
33	55	Maya Cloetens	Belgium	2 (1+0+0+1)	44:45.0	+4:50.1
34	6	Valentina Dimitrova	Bulgaria	2 (2+0+0+0)	44:57.1	+4:54.2
35	64	Eve Bouvard	Belgium	3 (0+2+1+0)	45:06.5	+5:03.6
36	75	Anna Mąka	Poland	3 (1+2+0+0)	45:07.5	+5:04.6
37	86	Lea Rothschopf	Austria	3 (0+1+0+2)	45:12.1	+5:09.2
38	8	Anastasia Tolmacheva	Romania	3 (0+1+0+2)	45:18.7	+5:15.8
39	21	Yuliia Dzhima	Ukraine	3 (0+0+0+3)	45:25.0	+5:22.1
40	19	Joanna Jakieła	Poland	4 (0+1+1+2)	45:27.6	+5:24.7
41	85	Emma Lunder	Canada	3 (1+1+1+0)	45:30.2	+5:27.3
42	76	Chloe Levins	United States	1 (0+0+0+1)	45:32.5	+5:29.6
43	24	Lidiia Zhurauskaite	Lithuania	3 (0+3+0+0)	45:35.9	+5:33.0
44	41	Lora Hristova	Bulgaria	4 (0+2+0+2)	45:37.8	+5:34.9
45	79	Polona Klemenčič	Slovenia	4 (0+2+1+1)	45:49.3	+5:46.4
46	32	Aita Gasparin	Switzerland	3 (1+0+2+0)	45:50.8	+5:47.9
47	59	Natalia Sidorowicz	Poland	4 (0+1+2+1)	45:54.6	+5:51.7
48	66	Venla Lehtonen	Finland	3 (0+2+1+0)	46:06.8	+6:03.9
49	39	Tamara Steiner	Austria	3 (0+0+1+2)	46:23.4	+6:20.5
50	65	Elisa Gasparin	Switzerland	2 (1+0+0+1)	46:31.0	+6:28.1
51	1	Amy Baserga	Switzerland	4 (0+3+0+1)	46:31.2	+6:28.3
52	43	Tereza Voborníková	Czech Republic	5 (1+1+1+2)	46:33.5	+6:30.6
53	92	Júlia Machyniaková	Slovakia	3 (1+1+0+1)	46:38.3	+6:35.4
54	53	Noora Kaisa Keranen	Finland	2 (1+0+0+1)	46:50.4	+6:47.5
55	46	Natalja Kočergina	Lithuania	4 (0+2+1+1)	46:54.1	+6:51.2
56	77	Benita Peiffer	Canada	3 (0+2+0+1)	47:00.0	+6:57.1
57	35	Emily Dickson	Canada	3 (0+0+2+1)	47:05.9	+7:03.0
58	26	Anamarija Lampič	Slovenia	8 (2+2+3+1)	47:07.2	+7.04.3
59	82	Daria Virolainen	Finland	4 (1+1+0+2)	47:08.8	+7:05.9
60	38	Anika Kozica	Croatia	4 (0+1+1+2)	47:12.7	+7:09.8
61	15	Nadia Moser	Canada	4 (0+1+2+1)	47:14.2	+7:11.3
62	73	Susan Külm	Estonia	6 (0+2+2+2)	47:20.9	+7:18.0
63	62	Aliona Makarova	Moldova	4 (1+2+1+0)	47:37:0	+ 7:34.1
64	72	Judita Traubaite	Lithuania	5 (1+1+0+3)	47:38.0	+7:35.1
65	31	Ukaleq Astri Slettemark	Greenland	2 (0+1+0+1)	47:38.3	+7:35.4
66	78	Olga Poltoranina	Kazakhstan	2 (0+1+1+0)	47:41.2	+7:38.3
67	37	Baiba Bendika	Latvia	8 (1+4+2+1)	47:49.9	+7:46.2
68	9	Marit Ishol Skogan	Norway	6 (1+4+0+1)	47:49.9	+7:47.0
69	87	Sandra Buliņa	Latvia	4 (2+2+0+0)	47:54.8	+7:51.9
70	60	Maria Zdravkova	Bulgaria	3 (1+1+0+1)	47:55.3	+7:52.4
71	88	Lucie Charvátová	Czech Republic	7 (2+2+2+1)	47:56.9	+7:54.0
72	40	Darcie Morton	Australia	5 (2+0+1+2)	48:04.4	+8:01.5
73	80	Annija Sabule	Latvia	3 (0+1+1+1)	48:23.1	+8:20.2
74	69	Elena Chirkova	Romania	4 (2+0+1+1)	48:27.9	+8:25.0
75	71	Rebecca Passler	Italy	5 (0+1+2+2)	48:28.7	+8:25.8
76	81	Jung Ju-mi	South Korea	4 (0+1+1+2)	48:48.9	+8:46.0
77	51	Ida Lien	Norway	8 (0+3+1+4)	48:50.3	+8:47.4
78	45	Lena Repinc	Slovenia	6 (2+1+0+3)	48:52.8	+8:49.9
79	68	Ko Eun-jung	South Korea	4 (1+0+2+1)	49:06.4	+9:03.5
80	74	Zuzana Remeňová	Slovakia	5 (1+1+2+1)	49:09.7	+9:06.8
81	58	Andreea Mezdrea	Romania	5 (0+1+3+1)	49:19.2	+9:16.3
82	89	Polina Yegorova	Kazakhstan	5 (1+1+1+2)	49:34.5	+9:40.6
83	84	Daria Gembicka	Poland	6 (2+1+0+3)	50:38.4	+10:35.5
84	83	Jackie Garso	United States	5 (1+2+2+0)	51:51.0	+11:48.1
85	44	Mária Remeňová	Slovakia	9 (3+1+3+2)	52:05.2	+12:02.3
86	70	Hikaru Fukuda	Japan	6 (0+2+1+3)	52:09.4	+12:06.5
87	54	Konstantina Charalampidou	Greece	5 (1+2+1+1)	53:13.5	+13:10.6
88	42	Alla Ghilenko	Moldova	9 (0+4+1+4)	53:18.8	+13:15.9
89	90	Hanna-Brita Kaasik	Estonia	10 (2+2+2+4)	54:13.6	+14:10.7
90	52	Aoi Sato	Japan	11 (3+3+4+1)	54:21.6	+14:18.7
91	48	Tara Geraghty-Moats	United States	11 (3+2+3+3)	54:39.6	+14:36.7
–	17	Tuuli Tomingas	Estonia	Disqualified		
