= Biathlon World Championships 2024 – Women's mass start =

Sport Competition

Women's mass start at the Biathlon World Championships 2024
- Venue: Vysočina Arena
- Location: Nové Město na Moravě, Czech Republic
- Dates: 18 February
- Competitors: 30 from 13 nations
- Winning time: 34:37.2

Medalists
gold medal	Justine Braisaz-Bouchet	France
silver medal	Lisa Vittozzi	Italy
bronze medal	Lou Jeanmonnot	France

The Women's mass start competition at the Biathlon World Championships 2024 was held on 18 February 2024.

Hanna Öberg was the defending champion. She did not defend her title, finishing the competition in 9th place.

Reigning Olympic champion in mass start Justine Braisaz-Bouchet from France became the new world champion. The silver medal won Lisa Vittozzi from Italy, winning her fourth medal of this world championship and the bronze medal won Lou Jeanmonnot from France also with her fourth medal.

== Results ==
The race was started at 14:15.

Rank	Bib	Name	Nationality	Penalties (P+S)	Time	Deficit
1st place, gold medalist(s)	3	Justine Braisaz-Bouchet	France	0 (0+0+0+0)	34:37.2	
2nd place, silver medalist(s)	2	Lisa Vittozzi	Italy	0 (0+0+0+0)	35:08.4	+31.2
3rd place, bronze medalist(s)	5	Lou Jeanmonnot	France	1 (1+0+0+0)	35:33.9	+56.7
4	1	Julia Simon	France	3 (0+1+1+1)	36:02.1	+1:24.9
5	11	Vanessa Voigt	Germany	0 (0+0+0+0)	36:06.9	+1:29.7
6	29	Lisa Theresa Hauser	Austria	1 (0+0+0+1)	36:14.1	+1:36.9
7	17	Anna Gandler	Austria	2 (0+1+0+1)	36:22.0	+1:44.8
8	28	Tuuli Tomingas	Estonia	1 (1+0+0+0)	36:24.1	+1:46.9
9	14	Hanna Öberg	Sweden	3 (1+1+1+0)	36:25.6	+1:48.4
10	6	Ingrid Landmark Tandrevold	Norway	3 (0+0+3+0)	36:26.0	+1:48.8
11	9	Franziska Preuß	Germany	1 (0+1+0+0)	36:29.1	+1:51.9
12	22	Regina Ermits	Estonia	1 (0+0+1+0)	36:33.9	+1:56.7
13	12	Juni Arnekleiv	Norway	2 (0+0+1+1)	36:48.3	+2:11.1
14	24	Lotte Lie	Belgium	1 (0+0+0+1)	36:56.0	+2:18.8
15	20	Markéta Davidová	Czech Republic	3 (1+1+1+0)	37:06.0	+2:28.8
16	26	Natalia Sidorowicz	Poland	2 (0+0+1+1)	37:15.7	+2:38.5
17	15	Linn Persson	Sweden	3 (1+0+1+1)	37:15.9	+2:38.7
18	16	Sophie Chauveau	France	5 (2+2+0+1)	37:18.2	+2:41.0
19	10	Karoline Offigstad Knotten	Norway	2 (0+1+0+1)	37:19.0	+2:41.8
20	19	Dorothea Wierer	Italy	3 (0+2+0+1)	37:21.2	+2:44.0
21	13	Mona Brorsson	Sweden	2 (1+0+0+1)	37:37.1	+2:59.9
22	7	Elvira Öberg	Sweden	5 (1+2+2+0)	37:53.7	+3:16.5
23	21	Baiba Bendika	Latvia	6 (1+0+3+2)	37:56.1	+3:18.9
24	8	Lena Häcki	Switzerland	5 (1+1+2+1)	38:01.6	+3:24.4
25	30	Joanna Jakieła	Poland	2 (0+1+0+1)	38:04.8	+3:27.6
26	23	Anna Magnusson	Sweden	4 (2+1+1+0)	38:38.2	+4:01.0
27	18	Khrystyna Dmytrenko	Ukraine	3 (1+0+1+1)	38:55.1	+4:17.9
28	4	Janina Hettich-Walz	Germany	3 (1+0+1+1)	39:13.6	+4:36.4
29	25	Tamara Steiner	Austria	4 (2+0+1+1)	39:34.9	+4:57.7
30	27	Selina Grotian	Germany	7 (2+1+1+3)	40:09.6	+5:32.4
