= Biathlon at the 2026 Winter Olympics – Women's mass start =

Women's mass start at the XXV Olympic Winter Games
- Biathlon
- Venue: Anterselva Biathlon Arena
- Date: 21 February 2026
- Competitors: 30 from 13 nations
- Winning time: 37:18.1

Medalists
1st place, gold medalist(s)		Océane Michelon	France
2nd place, silver medalist(s)		Julia Simon	France
3rd place, bronze medalist(s)		Tereza Voborníková	Czech Republic

The women's mass start competition of the 2026 Winter Olympics was held on 21 February, at the Anterselva Biathlon Arena in Rasen-Antholz. Océane Michelon of France won the event, thus securing her first individual Olympic gold. Her teammate Julia Simon won the silver medal, and Tereza Voborníková of the Czech Republic won bronze, her first Olympic medal.

== Background ==
The defending champion, Justine Braisaz-Bouchet, qualified for the Olympics. The silver and bronze medalists, Tiril Eckhoff and Marte Olsbu Røiseland, retired from competitions. Prior to the Olympics, Lou Jeanmonnot was leading the total as well as mass-start standings of the 2025–26 Biathlon World Cup. Elvira Öberg was the 2025 World champion.

== Results ==
The race was started at 14:15.

Rank	Bib	Name	Country	Time	Penalties (P+P+S+S)	Deficit
1st place, gold medalist(s)	5	Océane Michelon	France	37:18.1	2 (1+0+0+1)	—
2nd place, silver medalist(s)	1	Julia Simon	France	37:24.7	1 (0+0+1+0)	+6.6
3rd place, bronze medalist(s)	20	Tereza Voborníková	Czech Republic	37:25.5	1 (1+0+0+0)	+7.4
4	8	Anna Magnusson	Sweden	37:44.7	0 (0+0+0+0)	+26.6
5	12	Dorothea Wierer	Italy	37:48.1	2 (0+1+1+0)	+30.0
6	10	Elvira Öberg	Sweden	37:50.0	1 (0+0+0+1)	+31.9
7	16	Vanessa Voigt	Germany	37:54.3	1 (0+0+0+1)	+36.2
8	21	Karoline Offigstad Knotten	Norway	38:01.9	2 (1+0+1+0)	+43.8
9	24	Anna Andexer	Austria	38:17.3	1 (0+0+1+0)	+59.2
10	9	Hanna Öberg	Sweden	38:21.2	3 (1+1+1+0)	+1:03.1
11	29	Joanna Jakieła	Poland	38:22.9	2 (0+1+0+1)	+1:04.8
12	2	Maren Kirkeeide	Norway	38:23.4	4 (1+1+0+2)	+1:05.3
13	28	Marthe Kråkstad Johansen	Norway	38:22.5	1 (0+0+0+1)	+1:05.4
14	6	Lora Hristova	Bulgaria	38:40.0	2 (0+0+0+2)	+1:21.9
15	25	Natalia Sidorowicz	Poland	38:44.0	2 (1+0+1+0)	+1:25.9
16	4	Lou Jeanmonnot	France	38:47.7	3 (0+0+1+2)	+1:29.6
17	30	Janina Hettich-Walz	Germany	38:59.7	4 (0+0+2+2)	+1:41.6
18	3	Lisa Vittozzi	Italy	39:01.6	4 (1+1+0+2)	+1:43.5
19	7	Suvi Minkkinen	Finland	39:05.1	1 (0+0+1+0)	+1:47.0
20	19	Milena Todorova	Bulgaria	39:14.4	5 (0+1+1+3)	+1:56.3
21	14	Amy Baserga	Switzerland	39:31.2	3 (1+0+1+1)	+2:13.1
22	27	Baiba Bendika	Latvia	39:49.8	5 (3+1+1+0)	+2:31.7
23	23	Estere Volfa	Latvia	39:50.1	4 (0+0+2+2)	+2:32.0
24	17	Lea Meier	Switzerland	40:18.4	4 (0+0+2+2)	+3:00.3
25	18	Linn Gestblom	Sweden	40:23.0	5 (0+2+1+2)	+3:04.9
26	15	Lisa Theresa Hauser	Austria	40:26.5	5 (3+1+1+0)	+3:08.4
27	11	Justine Braisaz-Bouchet	France	40:30.3	6 (0+2+2+2)	+3:12.2
28	13	Franziska Preuß	Germany	40:50.5	7 (1+1+4+1)	+3:32.4
29	26	Anne de Besche	Denmark	41:18.2	2 (0+0+1+1)	+4:00.1
30	22	Kamila Żuk	Poland	43:27.5	10 (2+3+3+2)	+6:09.4
