= Biathlon World Championships 2024 – Women's pursuit =

Women's pursuit at the Biathlon World Championships 2024
- Venue: Vysočina Arena
- Location: Nové Město na Moravě, Czech Republic
- Dates: 11 February
- Competitors: 59 from 20 nations
- Winning time: 29:54.8

Medalists
gold medal	Julia Simon	France
silver medal	Lisa Vittozzi	Italy
bronze medal	Justine Braisaz-Bouchet	France

The Women's pursuit competition at the Biathlon World Championships 2024 was held on 11 February 2024.

Julia Simon from France was the defending champion and successfully defended her title from the 2023 World Championships. She won her third of four gold medals at these championships. The silver medal was won by Lisa Vittozzi from Italy and the bronze medal won Justine Braisaz-Bouchet from France.

== Results ==
The race was started at 14:30.

Rank	Bib	Name	Nationality	Start	Penalties (P+P+S+S)	Time	Deficit
1st place, gold medalist(s)	1	Julia Simon	France	0:00	1 (0+1+0+0)	29:54.8	
2nd place, silver medalist(s)	7	Lisa Vittozzi	Italy	1:06	1 (0+0+0+1)	30:41.1	+46.3
3rd place, bronze medalist(s)	2	Justine Braisaz-Bouchet	France	0:05	4 (0+1+2+1)	30:44.1	+49.3
4	4	Sophie Chauveau	France	0:44	3 (0+1+1+1)	30:52.4	+57.6
5	8	Hanna Öberg	Sweden	1:07	2 (0+0+2+0)	31:11.4	+1:16.6
6	6	Franziska Preuß	Germany	1:05	1 (0+0+1+0)	31:19.5	+1:24.7
7	3	Lou Jeanmonnot	France	0:41	2 (1+0+1+0)	31:37.8	+1:43.0
8	9	Elvira Öberg	Sweden	1:09	2 (1+0+0+1)	32:00.1	+2:05.3
9	17	Markéta Davidová	Czech Republic	1:42	2 (0+1+1+0)	32:15.8	+2:21.0
10	24	Tuuli Tomingas	Estonia	1:56	2 (0+2+0+0)	32:25.1	+2:30.3
11	5	Baiba Bendika	Latvia	0:47	6 (3+2+0+1)	32:33.6	+2:38.8
12	11	Anna Gandler	Austria	1:19	2 (0+0+0+2)	32:37.6	+2:42.8
13	32	Tereza Voborníková	Czech Republic	2:10	1 (1+0+0+0)	32:42.0	+2:47.2
14	16	Natalia Sidorowicz	Poland	1:40	2 (0+0+0+1)	32:45.8	+2:51.0
15	18	Vanessa Voigt	Germany	1:43	1 (0+1+0+0)	32:47.0	+2:52.2
16	13	Tamara Steiner	Austria	1:36	0 (0+0+0+0)	32:51.6	+2:56.8
17	23	Joanna Jakieła	Poland	1:51	1 (0+0+1+0)	32:56.5	+3:01.7
18	15	Jeanne Richard	France	1:37	4 (0+1+1+2)	33:00.4	+3:05.7
19	20	Anna Magnusson	Sweden	1:45	3 (2+0+1+0)	33:05.8	+3:11.0
20	27	Lotte Lie	Belgium	1:59	1 (0+0+0+1)	33:10.7	+3:15.9
21	10	Dorothea Wierer	Italy	1:19	4 (0+2+1+1)	33:19.6	+3:24.8
22	34	Lisa Theresa Hauser	Austria	2:15	1 (1+0+0+0)	33:21.8	+3:27.0
23	37	Samuela Comola	Italy	2:20	1 (0+0+1+0)	33:24.4	+3:29.6
24	26	Regina Ermits	Estonia	1:57	3 (1+2+0+0)	33:26.4	+3:31.6
25	35	Janina Hettich-Walz	Germany	2:15	3 (0+1+0+2)	33:39.7	+3:44.9
26	12	Khrystyna Dmytrenko	Ukraine	1:26	4 (2+0+1+1)	33:41.5	+3:46.7
27	41	Susan Külm	Estonia	2:27	2 (0+1+1+0)	33:44.8	+3:50.0
28	36	Anamarija Lampič	Slovenia	2:19	7 (1+3+2+1)	33:46.4	+3:51.6
29	47	Suvi Minkkinen	Finland	2:38	1 (0+0+0+1)	34:00.0	+4:05.2
30	22	Ida Lien	Norway	1:50	6 (0+1+1+4)	34:00.7	+4:05.9
31	14	Juni Arnekleiv	Norway	1:36	5 (2+1+0+2)	34:06.7	+4:11.9
32	51	Anna Juppe	Austria	2:48	3 (0+1+1+1)	34:20.1	+4:25.3
33	45	Michela Carrara	Italy	2:32	5 (1+2+2+0)	34:24.9	+4:30.1
34	25	Ingrid Landmark Tandrevold	Norway	1:57	6 (0+0+3+3)	34:30.9	+4:36.1
35	21	Yuliia Dzhima	Ukraine	1:48	4 (2+1+1+0)	34:33.8	+4:39.0
36	29	Anastasiya Merkushyna	Ukraine	2:06	4 (1+1+0+2)	34:46.0	+4:51.2
37	28	Sophia Schneider	Germany	2:04	5 (1+1+1+2)	34:53.2	+4:58.4
38	50	Elisa Gasparin	Switzerland	2:42	2 (1+1+0+0)	34:59.5	+5:04.7
39	38	Mona Brorsson	Sweden	2:22	4 (1+1+2+0)	35:12.8	+5:18.0
40	52	Venla Lehtonen	Finland	2:49	2 (0+0+1+1)	35:14.2	+5:19.4
41	55	Maya Cloetens	Belgium	2:53	2 (1+0+1+0)	35:19.2	+5:24.4
42	48	Jessica Jislová	Czech Republic	2:38	3 (0+2+1+0)	35:20.0	+5:25.2
43	31	Lena Repinc	Slovenia	2:09	4 (1+1+1+1)	35:20.7	+5:25.9
44	42	Ekaterina Avvakumova	South Korea	2:28	4 (2+2+0+0)	35:24.3	+5:29.5
45	19	Iryna Petrenko	Ukraine	1:44	4 (2+1+1+0)	35:25.5	+5:30.7
46	39	Deedra Irwin	United States	2:25	4 (1+0+1+2)	35:28.7	+5:33.9
47	30	Daria Virolainen	Finland	2:09	4 (0+0+3+1)	35:32.9	+5:38.1
48	44	Polona Klemenčič	Slovenia	2:32	4 (1+2+1+0)	35:43.5	+5:48.7
49	49	Eve Bouvard	Belgium	2:42	4 (0+1+1+2)	36:10.3	+6:15.5
50	59	Noora Kaisa Keranen	Finland	2:59	3 (0+1+0+2)	36:17.0	+6:22.2
51	56	Natalja Kočergina	Lithuania	2:53	4 (0+1+1+2)	36:20.2	+6:25.4
52	57	Emily Dickson	Canada	2:56	3 (0+1+1+1)	36:30.3	+6:35.5
53	43	Galina Vishnevskaya-Sheporenko	Kazakhstan	2:29	3 (0+0+1+2)	36:30.8	+6:36.0
54	54	Amy Baserga	Switzerland	2:53	7 (0+3+2+2)	36:39.2	+6:44.4
55	46	Anna Mąka	Poland	2:32	6 (3+1+1+1)	36:39.5	+6:44.7
56	53	Nadia Moser	Canada	2:51	4 (1+2+0+1)	36:47.1	+6:52.3
57	60	Lidiia Zhurauskaite	Lithuania	3:02	6 (1+1+1+3)	37:54.1	+7:59.3
–	33	Karoline Offigstad Knotten	Norway	2:13	Did not start		
–	40	Lucie Charvátová	Czech Republic	2:27	Lapped		
–	58	Tara Geraghty-Moats	United States	2:58	Lapped		
