= 2018 IBU Junior Open European Championships =

Sports championship

The 3rd IBU Junior Open European Championships was held from 31 January to 4 February 2018 in Pokljuka, Slovenia.

There are a total of 8 competitions: Single Mixed Relay, Relay Mixed, Sprint Women, Sprint Men, Pursuit Women, Pursuit Men, Individual Women and Individual Men.

== Schedule ==
All times are local (UTC+1).

Date	Time	Event
31 January	10:00	Single Mixed Relay
31 January	13:00	Relay Mixed
1 February	10:00	Men's 15 km Individual
1 February	13:30	Women's 12.5 km Individual
3 February	11:00	Men's 10 km Sprint
3 February	14:00	Women's 7.5 km Sprint
4 February	10:00	Men's 12.5 km Pursuit
4 February	13:00	Women's 10 km Pursuit

== Medal summary ==
=== Medal table ===
Rank	Nation	Gold	Silver	Bronze	Total
1	Russia (RUS)	6	3	1	10
2	Austria (AUT)	1	0	0	1
2	Finland (FIN)	1	0	0	1
4	Ukraine (UKR)	0	1	1	2
5	Italy (ITA)	0	1	0	1
5	Slovenia (SLO)	0	1	0	1
5	Sweden (SWE)	0	1	0	1
5	Switzerland (SUI)	0	1	0	1
9	France (FRA)	0	0	3	3
10	Belarus (BLR)	0	0	1	1
10	Czech Republic (CZE)	0	0	1	1
10	Poland (POL)	0	0	1	1
Totals (12 entries)		8	8	8	24

=== Men ===
Event	Gold		Silver		Bronze	
Men's 15 km individual Details	Said Karimulla Khalili; Russia	41:36.7 (0+0+1+0)	Vasiliy Tomshin; Russia	42:40.4 (0+1+0+0)	Vítězslav Hornig; Czech Republic	43:17.0 (0+0+0+0)
10 km Sprint; Details	Igor Malinovskii; Russia	30:10.0 (0+1)	Said Karimulla Khalili; Russia	30:13.7 (0+1)	Bogdan Tsymbal; Ukraine	30:23.0 (0+0)
12.5 km Pursuit; Details	Igor Malinovskii; Russia	35:41.0 (0+1+1+1)	Bogdan Tsymbal; Ukraine	35:42.8 (0+0+1+0)	Martin Perrillat-Bottonet; France	35:49.6 (0+0+0+2)

=== Women ===
Event	Gold		Silver		Bronze	
Women's 12.5 km individual Details	Tamara Steiner; Austria	42:10.3 (0+0+0+0)	Amy Baserga; Switzerland	42:24.1 (0+0+0+0)	Valeriya Vasnetcova; Russia	42:57.3 (0+0+0+4)
7.5 km Sprint; Details	Valeriya Vasnetcova; Russia	25:12.2 (0+1)	Polina Shevnina; Russia	25:33.1 (0+1)	Sophie Chauveau; France	25:50.8 (1+1)
10 km Pursuit; Details	Polina Shevnina; Russia	36:22.4 (0+1+1+1)	Elvira Öberg; Sweden	36:53.8 (1+0+0+0)	Sophie Chauveau; France	37:01.3 (0+1+2+1)

=== Mixed ===
Event	Gold		Silver		Bronze	
Single mixed relay Details	Finland Jenni Keränen; Jaakko Ranta; Jenni Keränen; Jaakko Ranta	43:15.9 (0+0) (0+1) (0+0) (0+0) (0+2) (0+2) (0+1) (0+2)	Slovenia Urška Poje; Anton Vidmar; Urška Poje; Anton Vidmar	43:35.2 (0+2) (0+0) (0+3) (0+0) (0+2) (0+2) (0+1) (0+1)	Belarus Volha Haurylkina; Dzmitry Lazouski; Volha Haurylkina; Dzmitry Lazouski	43:44.6 (0+1) (0+1) (2+3) (0+2) (0+2) (0+2) (0+1) (0+1)
2 × 6 km + 2 × 7.5 km Relay; Details	Russia Polina Shevnina; Valeriya Vasnetcova; Vasiliy Tomshin; Igor Malinovskii	1:15:32.0 (0+1) (0+2) (0+1) (0+1) (0+0) (0+0) (0+2) (0+0)	Italy Irene Lardschneider; Eleonora Fauner; Patrick Braunhofer; Daniele Cappellari	1:17:51.0 (0+1) (0+0) (0+1) (0+1) (0+0) (0+1) (0+0) (0+1)	Poland Natalia Tomaszewska; Joanna Jakieła; Przemysław Pancerz; Marcin Szwajnos	1:18:45.7 (0+1) (0+0) (0+0) (0+2) (0+0) (0+1) (0+3) (0+1)
