= Biathlon World Championships 2023 – Women's mass start =

Winter sport event in Oberhof, Germany

Women's mass start at the Biathlon World Championships 2023
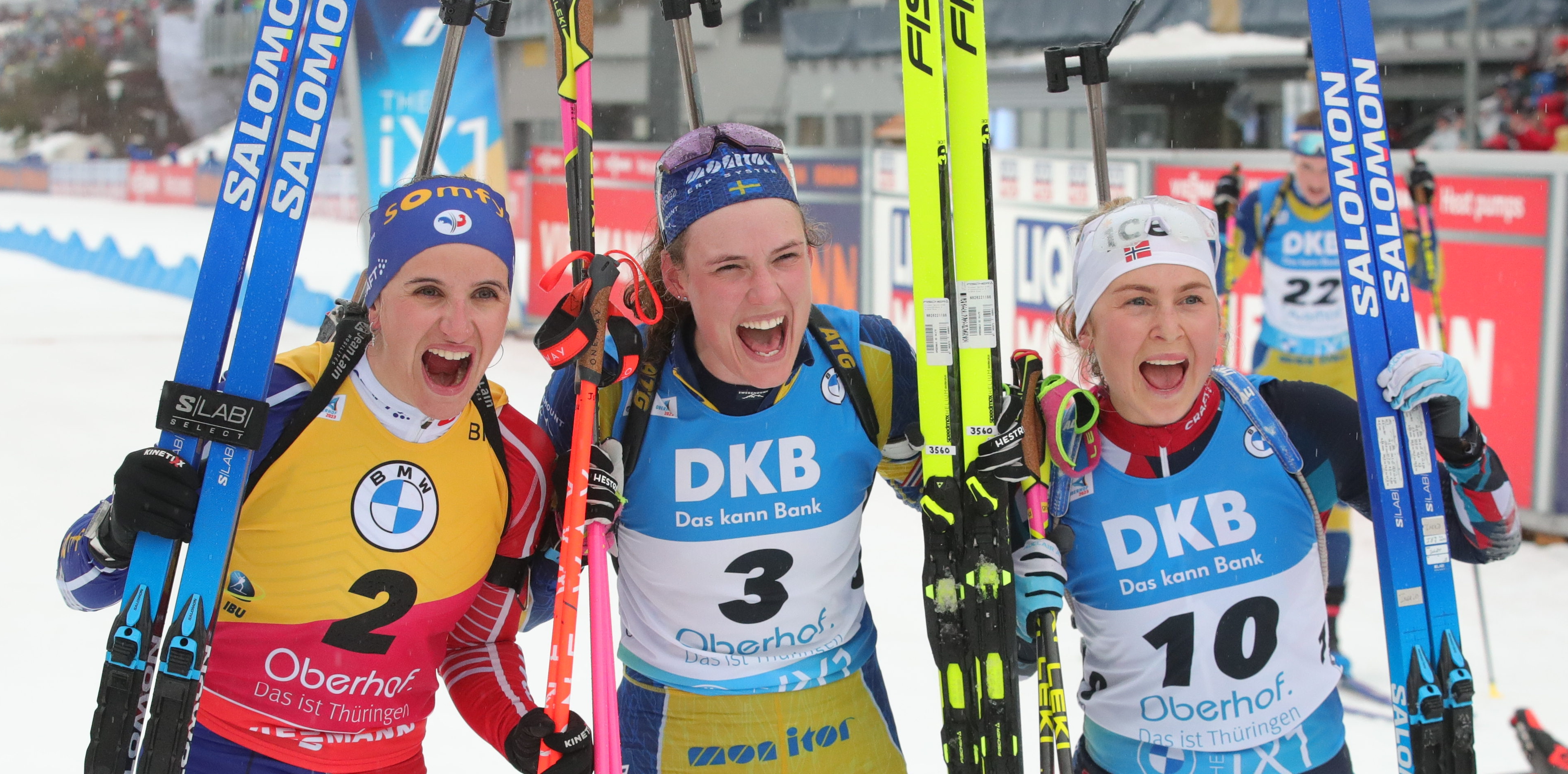
- Location: Oberhof, Germany
- Dates: 19 February
- Competitors: 30 from 14 nations
- Winning time: 36:48.0

Medalists
gold medal	Hanna Öberg	Sweden
silver medal	Ingrid Landmark Tandrevold	Norway
bronze medal	Julia Simon	France

The women's 12.5 km mass start competition at the Biathlon World Championships 2023 was held on 19 February 2023.

== Results ==
The race was started at 15:15.

Rank	Bib	Name	Nationality	Penalties (P+P+S+S)	Time	Deficit
1st place, gold medalist(s)	3	Hanna Öberg	Sweden	2 (1+1+0+0)	36:48.0	—
2nd place, silver medalist(s)	10	Ingrid Landmark Tandrevold	Norway	1 (0+1+0+0)	36:52.8	+4.8
3rd place, bronze medalist(s)	2	Julia Simon	France	3 (1+1+0+1)	37:08.8	+20.8
4	11	Anaïs Chevalier-Bouchet	France	1 (0+0+0+1)	37:22.7	+34.7
5	9	Markéta Davidová	Czech Republic	2 (0+1+1+0)	37:39.4	+51.4
6	28	Karoline Offigstad Knotten	Norway	1 (0+1+0+0)	37:45.7	+57.7
7	20	Emma Lunder	Canada	2 (0+1+1+0)	37:45.8	+57.8
8	4	Linn Persson	Sweden	2 (0+0+1+1)	37:48.6	+1:00.6
9	8	Lisa Theresa Hauser	Austria	2 (0+0+1+1)	37:49.9	+1:01.9
10	26	Samuela Comola	Italy	0 (0+0+0+0)	37:50.4	+1:02.4
11	25	Lena Häcki	Switzerland	2 (0+1+1+0)	37:51.0	+1:03.0
12	17	Hanna Kebinger	Germany	2 (0+1+0+1)	37:51.2	+1:03.2
13	23	Chloé Chevalier	France	2 (0+1+0+1)	37:51.7	+1:03.7
14	7	Dorothea Wierer	Italy	2 (0+1+1+0)	38:02.5	+1:14.5
15	12	Lou Jeanmonnot	France	2 (0+0+1+1)	38:08.0	+1:20.0
16	15	Paulína Fialková	Slovakia	3 (0+1+1+1)	38:14.3	+1:26.3
17	5	Marte Olsbu Røiseland	Norway	3 (0+1+1+1)	38:28.7	+1:40.7
18	18	Tereza Voborníková	Czech Republic	2 (0+0+0+2)	38:31.0	+1:43.0
19	24	Polona Klemenčič	Slovenia	4 (0+1+2+1)	38:50.7	+2:02.7
20	27	Tuuli Tomingas	Estonia	4 (0+0+1+3)	39:02.5	+2:14.5
21	22	Mona Brorsson	Sweden	3 (1+0+2+0)	39:11.2	+2:23.2
22	6	Lisa Vittozzi	Italy	5 (0+1+2+2)	39:23.3	+2:35.3
23	13	Vanessa Voigt	Germany	3 (0+1+0+2)	39:34.8	+2:46.8
24	1	Denise Herrmann-Wick	Germany	5 (1+1+3+0)	39:42.2	+2:54.2
25	19	Suvi Minkkinen	Finland	3 (1+1+0+1)	40:03.3	+3:15.3
26	14	Anna Magnusson	Sweden	5 (3+0+0+2)	40:13.3	+3:25.3
27	16	Sophia Schneider	Germany	5 (1+2+1+1)	40:14.1	+3:26.1
28	21	Juni Arnekleiv	Norway	5 (1+3+0+1)	40:15.5	+3:27.5
29	30	Hannah Auchentaller	Italy	6 (1+1+1+3)	41:18.5	+4:30.5
30	29	Aita Gasparin	Switzerland	4 (1+1+1+1)	41:39.3	+4:51.3
