= Biathlon World Championships 2019 – Women's individual =

Women's individual at the Biathlon World Championships 2019
- Venue: Östersund Ski Stadium
- Location: Östersund, Sweden
- Dates: 12 March
- Competitors: 93 from 30 nations
- Winning time: 43:10.4

Medalists
gold medal	Hanna Öberg	Sweden
silver medal	Lisa Vittozzi	Italy
bronze medal	Justine Braisaz	France

The women's individual competition at the Biathlon World Championships 2019 was held on 12 March 2019.

== Results ==
The race was started at 15:30.

Rank	Bib	Name	Nationality	Time	Penalties (P+S+P+S)	Deficit
1st place, gold medalist(s)	30	Hanna Öberg	Sweden	43:10.4	0 (0+0+0+0)	
2nd place, silver medalist(s)	56	Lisa Vittozzi	Italy	43:34.0	0 (0+0+0+0)	+23.6
3rd place, bronze medalist(s)	71	Justine Braisaz	France	43:42.9	1 (0+0+1+0)	+32.5
4	28	Laura Dahlmeier	Germany	43:49.9	1 (0+0+1+0)	+39.5
5	4	Paulína Fialková	Slovakia	43:55.9	1 (0+0+0+1)	+45.5
6	51	Mona Brorsson	Sweden	44:00.3	1 (1+0+0+0)	+49.9
7	47	Lisa Hauser	Austria	44:04.1	0 (0+0+0+0)	+53.7
8	44	Dorothea Wierer	Italy	44:17.1	2 (0+2+0+0)	+1:06.7
9	78	Selina Gasparin	Switzerland	45:09.9	1 (0+1+0+0)	+1:59.5
10	57	Anastasiya Merkushyna	Ukraine	45:15.0	1 (0+0+0+1)	+2:04.6
11	27	Lena Häcki	Switzerland	45:30.6	2 (1+1+0+0)	+2:20.2
12	81	Yuliia Dzhima	Ukraine	45:39.0	0 (0+0+0+0)	+2:28.6
13	61	Veronika Vítková	Czech Republic	45:40.9	1 (1+0+0+0)	+2:30.5
14	2	Yuliya Zhuravok	Ukraine	45:43.9	0 (0+0+0+0)	+2:33.5
15	25	Linn Persson	Sweden	45:45.1	2 (0+1+0+1)	+2:34.7
16	95	Larisa Kuklina	Russia	46:04.1	1 (1+0+0+0)	+2:53.7
17	5	Ekaterina Yurlova-Percht	Russia	46:11.7	3 (1+1+0+1)	+3:01.3
18	26	Ingrid Landmark Tandrevold	Norway	46:15.2	3 (1+1+1+0)	+3:04.8
19	53	Vanessa Hinz	Germany	46:16.8	2 (0+1+1+0)	+3:06.4
20	42	Célia Aymonier	France	46:23.9	4 (1+2+1+0)	+3:13.5
21	48	Elisa Gasparin	Switzerland	46:25.1	2 (0+0+1+1)	+3:14.7
22	93	Emma Nilsson	Sweden	46:26.2	1 (0+0+1+0)	+3:15.8
23	20	Marte Olsbu Røiseland	Norway	46:36.4	4 (0+1+2+1)	+3:26.0
24	8	Julia Simon	France	46:47.7	4 (1+1+0+2)	+3:37.3
25	45	Tuuli Tomingas	Estonia	46:48.8	2 (0+1+1+0)	+3:38.4
26	74	Emma Lunder	Canada	46:50.0	2 (2+0+0+0)	+3:39.6
27	24	Zhang Yan	China	46:50.6	1 (1+0+0+0)	+3:40.2
28	17	Johanna Talihärm	Estonia	47:02.5	2 (0+1+0+1)	+3:52.1
29	10	Synnøve Solemdal	Norway	47:03.3	2 (0+1+0+1)	+3:52.9
30	31	Susan Dunklee	United States	47:05.5	3 (0+1+1+1)	+3:55.1
31	9	Franziska Hildebrand	Germany	47:15.0	3 (1+0+1+1)	+4:04.6
32	80	Joanne Reid	United States	47:22.1	3 (0+2+0+1)	+4:11.7
33	64	Svetlana Mironova	Russia	47:26.4	5 (1+1+1+2)	+4:16.0
34	22	Fuyuko Tachizaki	Japan	47:28.5	3 (0+0+2+1)	+4:18.1
35	66	Christina Rieder	Austria	47:31.9	1 (0+0+1+0)	+4:21.5
36	92	Valentyna Semerenko	Ukraine	47:32.6	3 (0+0+1+2)	+4:22.2
37	34	Tiril Eckhoff	Norway	47:32.7	5 (2+0+1+2)	+4:22.3
38	21	Franziska Preuß	Germany	47:37.4	4 (0+2+1+1)	+4:27.0
39	32	Monika Hojnisz	Poland	47:42.9	3 (1+1+1+0)	+4:32.5
40	50	Tang Jialin	China	47:56.2	1 (0+0+0+1)	+4:45.8
41	79	Meng Fanqi	China	47:56.7	1 (0+1+0+0)	+4:46.3
42	68	Eva Puskarčíková	Czech Republic	48:03.8	3 (0+1+1+1)	+4:53.4
43	15	Markéta Davidová	Czech Republic	48:08.6	5 (0+2+1+2)	+4:58.2
44	33	Galina Vishnevskaya	Kazakhstan	48:11.2	3 (1+1+0+1)	+5:00.8
45	13	Kaisa Mäkäräinen	Finland	48:16.5	5 (1+3+0+1)	+5:06.1
46	77	Elena Kruchinkina	Belarus	48:16.7	4 (1+2+1+0)	+5:06.3
47	29	Terézia Poliaková	Slovakia	48:21.7	2 (1+0+0+1)	+5:11.3
48	62	Kamila Żuk	Poland	48:26.3	4 (0+1+2+1)	+5:15.9
49	12	Anaïs Chevalier	France	48:26.9	4 (1+1+0+2)	+5:16.5
50	43	Irina Kruchinkina	Belarus	48:42.1	4 (0+2+1+1)	+5:31.7
51	14	Anna Frolina	South Korea	48:42.7	3 (1+1+0+1)	+5:32.3
52	16	Baiba Bendika	Latvia	48:46.5	4 (0+1+0+3)	+5:36.1
53	19	Clare Egan	United States	48:47.2	5 (1+0+1+3)	+5:36.8
54	52	Daniela Kadeva	Bulgaria	48:47.6	3 (1+2+0+0)	+5:37.2
55	89	Jessica Jislová	Czech Republic	48:49.7	4 (2+1+0+1)	+5:39.3
56	87	Suvi Minkkinen	Finland	49:12.5	2 (0+1+0+1)	+6:02.1
57	3	Julia Schwaiger	Austria	49:14.8	4 (1+2+1+0)	+6:04.4
58	7	Anastasiya Kuzmina	Slovakia	49:19.1	7 (4+1+1+1)	+6:08.7
59	76	Regina Oja	Estonia	49:31.5	4 (1+0+2+1)	+6:21.1
60	49	Uliana Kaisheva	Russia	49:53.4	6 (1+0+3+2)	+6:43.0
61	11	Alexia Runggaldier	Italy	50:05.4	3 (0+1+1+1)	+6:55.0
62	1	Iryna Kryuko	Belarus	50:18.1	6 (2+2+1+1)	+7:07.7
63	18	Rosanna Crawford	Canada	50:24.9	4 (1+3+0+0)	+7:14.5
64	58	Sarah Beaudry	Canada	50:25.4	4 (0+1+0+3)	+7:15.0
65	69	Anna Magnusson	Sweden	50:27.8	5 (1+2+2+0)	+7:17.4
66	75	Yurie Tanaka	Japan	50:29.2	3 (2+0+0+1)	+7:18.8
67	84	Kinga Zbylut	Poland	50:41.9	5 (1+1+0+3)	+7:31.5
68	82	Emilia Yordanova	Bulgaria	50:44.2	4 (1+1+0+2)	+7:33.8
69	60	Nicole Gontier	Italy	50:47.2	7 (2+2+1+2)	+7:36.8
70	23	Ivona Fialková	Slovakia	50:52.8	6 (2+1+1+2)	+7:42.4
71	37	Yelizaveta Belchenko	Kazakhstan	50:54.3	4 (0+1+0+3)	+7:43.9
72	90	Desislava Stoyanova	Bulgaria	50:56.5	4 (0+2+0+2)	+7:46.1
73	85	Karolina Pitoń	Poland	51:02.7	4 (0+2+2+0)	+7:52.3
74	41	Venla Lehtonen	Finland	51:15.1	6 (2+2+0+2)	+8:04.7
75	88	Megan Bankes	Canada	51:22.1	5 (1+1+2+1)	+8:11.7
76	65	Gabrielė Leščinskaitė	Lithuania	51:30.8	3 (0+2+0+1)	+8:20.4
77	39	Ko Eun-jung	South Korea	51:44.5	2 (0+1+0+1)	+8:34.1
78	72	Laura Toivanen	Finland	51:54.7	5 (0+1+1+3)	+8:44.3
79	70	Kim Seon-su	South Korea	51:55.7	4 (1+1+1+1)	+8:45.3
80	40	Natalija Kočergina	Lithuania	52:15.5	6 (2+0+2+2)	+9:05.1
81	73	Polona Klemenčič	Slovenia	52:42.2	6 (1+3+1+1)	+9:31.8
82	46	Nika Blaženić	Croatia	52:50.8	6 (3+1+1+1)	+9:40.4
83	38	Urška Poje	Slovenia	53:06.2	5 (0+2+2+1)	+9:55.8
84	35	Sari Maeda	Japan	53:19.9	8 (3+1+3+1)	+10:09.5
85	6	Dzinara Alimbekava	Belarus	53:22.7	8 (4+2+2+0)	+10:12.3
86	94	Ana Jesipionok	Lithuania	54:22.8	1 (0+0+0+1)	+11:12.4
87	59	Jillian Colebourn	Australia	54:24.6	4 (1+1+0+2)	+11:14.2
88	83	Anika Kožica	Croatia	54:26.2	5 (2+1+0+2)	+11:15.8
89	91	Lyudmila Akhatova	Kazakhstan	54:30.0	6 (0+2+2+2)	+11:19.6
90	36	Enikő Márton	Romania	54:36.8	3 (1+1+0+1)	+11:26.4
91	86	Lea Einfalt	Slovenia	54:58.7	8 (2+3+1+2)	+11:48.3
92	54	Rieke De Maeyer	Belgium	55:46.0	4 (0+1+0+3)	+12:35.6
93	55	Maria Tsakiri	Greece	57:00.6	6 (1+0+4+1)	+13:50.2
	63	Anastassiya Kondratyeva	Kazakhstan	Did not start		
	67	Alla Ghilenko	Moldova	Did not start		
