= Mária Remeňová =

Slovak biathlete (born 2000)

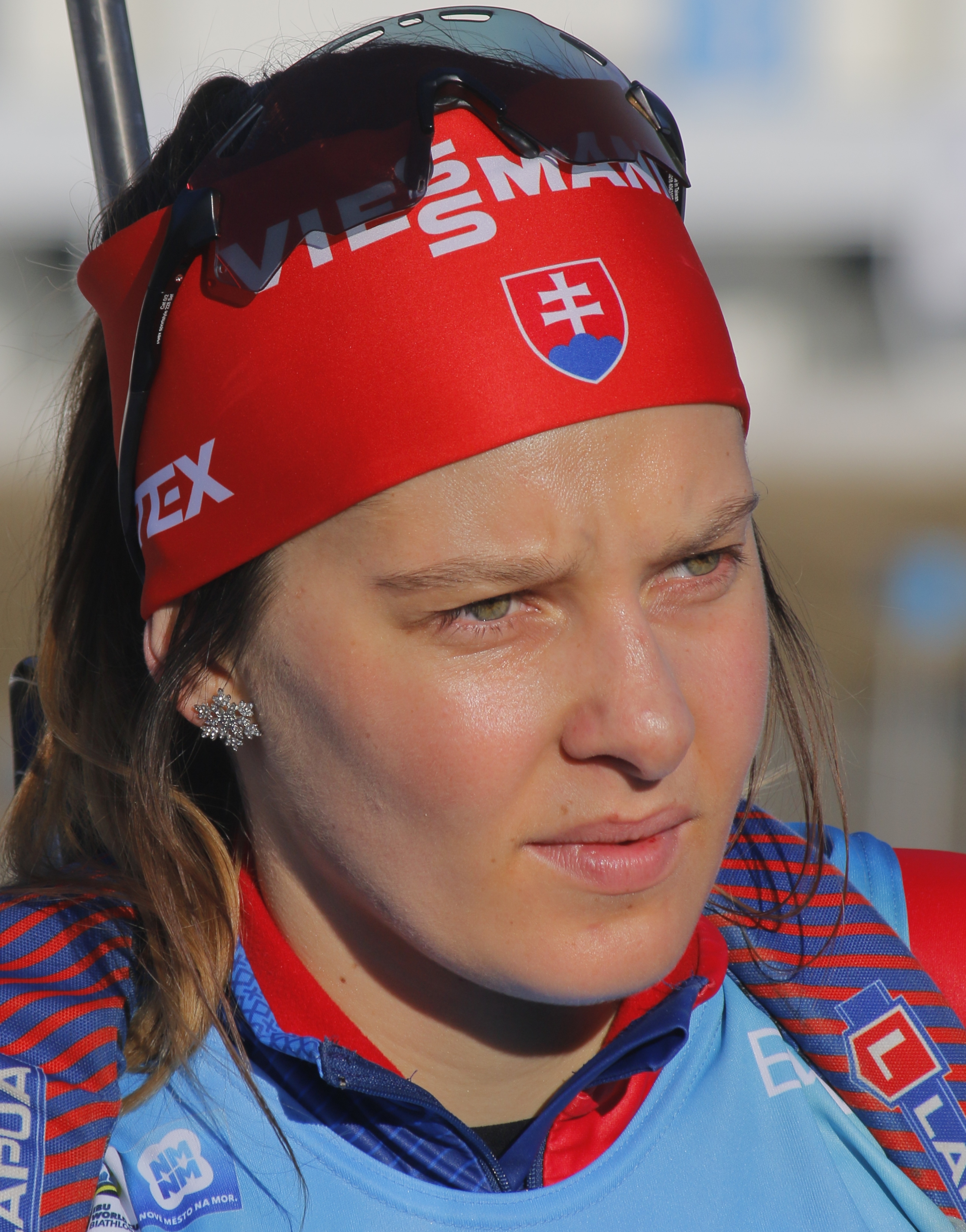
- Mária Remeňová in 2023

Personal information
- Nationality: Slovakia
- Born: 27 July 2000 (age 26) Dolný Kubín, Slovakia
- Height: 172 cm (5 ft 8 in)
- Weight: 62 kg (137 lb)

Sport

Professional information
- Sport: Biathlon
- Club: ŠK Železiarne Podbrezová

Mária Remeňová (born 27 July 2000) is a Slovak biathlete. She represented Slovakia at the 2026 Winter Olympics and has competed in the Biathlon World Cup since 2021. She is the twin sister of biathlete Zuzana Remeňová.

== Personal life ==
Remeňová was born on 27 July 2000 in Dolný Kubín and grew up in the village of Hruštín in the Námestovo District. She has a twin sister, Zuzana Remeňová, who is also a biathlete. The sisters started biathlon around the age of 11 after competing in school cross-country races. They were initially coached by Anton Matejčík at KB Breza before joining ŠK Železiarne Podbrezová under Peter Kazár. She is a student. Outside biathlon she has also competed in cross-country skiing, recording a podium finish in the Slavic Cup in March 2022.

== Career ==
Remeňová debuted internationally as a junior in the 2017/18 season and competed at the Youth and Junior World Championships in 2018, 2019 and 2020. She made her IBU Cup debut on 10 January 2020 in Osrblie and her World Cup debut on 4 March 2021 in the women’s relay in Nové Město na Moravě (15th place). She became a regular member of the Slovak team from 2021, primarily contributing in relays while gradually improving her individual results. Notable achievements include a 6th place in the women’s relay at the 2025 World Championships in Lenzerheide and a 5th place in the Hochfilzen relay during the 2025/26 season. In the 2025/26 season she scored her first World Cup points with 34th place in the Oberhof sprint and achieved her career-best individual result of 20th in the shortened individual in Nové Město na Moravě, which also qualified her for her first mass start (29th). She finished the season ranked 76th overall in the World Cup.

=== 2026 Winter Olympics ===
At the 2026 Winter Olympics in Milano Cortina, Remeňová competed in four events: 15 km individual – 82nd, 7.5 km sprint – 51st, 10 km pursuit – 38th, 4 × 6 km relay – 10th (as part of team Slovakia).
