= Biathlon World Championships 2021 – Single mixed relay =

Single mixed relay at the Biathlon World Championships 2021
- Location: Pokljuka, Slovenia
- Date: 18 February
- Competitors: 56 from 28 nations
- Teams: 28
- Winning time: 36:42.4

Medalists
gold medal	Antonin Guigonnat; Julia Simon	France
silver medal	Johannes Thingnes Bø; Tiril Eckhoff	Norway
bronze medal	Sebastian Samuelsson; Hanna Öberg	Sweden

The Single mixed relay competition at the Biathlon World Championships 2021 was held on 18 February 2021.

== Results ==
The race was started at 15:15.

Rank	Bib	Team	Time	Penalties (P+S)	Deficit
1st place, gold medalist(s)	1	France; Antonin Guigonnat; Julia Simon; Antonin Guigonnat; Julia Simon	36:42.4; 7:56.9; 8:37.3; 7:43.3; 12:24.9	0+3 0+2; 0+2 0+1; 0+0 0+0; 0+0 0+0; 0+1 0+1	
2nd place, silver medalist(s)	3	Norway; Johannes Thingnes Bø; Tiril Eckhoff; Johannes Thingnes Bø; Tiril Eckhoff	36:45.2; 7:46.3; 8:48.1; 7:59.4; 12:11.4	0+5 0+4; 0+1 0+2; 0+1 0+1; 0+3 0+1; 0+0 0+0	+2.8
3rd place, bronze medalist(s)	2	Sweden; Sebastian Samuelsson; Hanna Öberg; Sebastian Samuelsson; Hanna Öberg	37:05.0; 7:56.2; 8:44.1; 7:47.9; 12:36.8	0+4 0+4; 0+2 0+1; 0+0 0+1; 0+0 0+1; 0+2 0+1	+22.6
4	14	Ukraine; Artem Pryma; Darya Blashko; Artem Pryma; Darya Blashko	37:18.3; 7:57.4; 8:44.4; 7:51.7; 12:44.8	0+1 0+2; 0+1 0+1; 0+0 0+0; 0+0 0+0; 0+0 0+1	+35.9
5	7	Italy; Lukas Hofer; Dorothea Wierer; Lukas Hofer; Dorothea Wierer	37:37.6; 7:42.3; 8:44.9; 7:55.2; 13:15.2	0+1 1+5; 0+0 0+1; 0+0 0+0; 0+1 0+1; 0+0 1+3	+55.2
6	8	Austria; Simon Eder; Lisa Theresa Hauser; Simon Eder; Lisa Theresa Hauser	37:45.9; 7:41.8; 8:52.1; 8:12.2; 12:59.8	0+2 1+5; 0+0 0+0; 0+1 0+0; 0+1 0+2; 0+0 1+3	+1:03.5
7	4	Germany; Erik Lesser; Franziska Preuß; Erik Lesser; Franziska Preuß	38:03.6; 8:12.6; 9:14.9; 7:55.1; 12:41.0	0+5 1+5; 0+1 1+3; 0+2 0+2; 0+1 0+0; 0+1 0+0	+1:21.2
8	6	Canada; Christian Gow; Emma Lunder; Christian Gow; Emma Lunder	38:06.8; 7:56.6; 9:11.6; 7:57.2; 13:01.4	0+3 0+3; 0+0 0+2; 0+1 0+1; 0+0 0+0; 0+2 0+0	+1:24.4
9	16	Switzerland; Benjamin Weger; Irene Cadurisch; Benjamin Weger; Irene Cadurisch	38:32.6; 8:02.8; 8:48.2; 8:41.3; 13:00.3	1+4 0+5; 0+1 0+1; 0+0 0+0; 1+3 0+1; 0+0 0+3	+1:50.2
10	17	Estonia; Rene Zahkna; Johanna Talihärm; Rene Zahkna; Johanna Talihärm	38:38.8; 7:57.9; 9:51.3; 8:07.3; 12:42.3	1+6 0+1; 0+2 0+0; 1+3 0+1; 0+1 0+0; 0+0 0+0	+1:56.4
11	9	RBU; Eduard Latypov; Evgeniya Pavlova; Eduard Latypov; Evgeniya Pavlova	38:54.1; 8:14.7; 9:07.9; 8:16.5; 13:15.0	0+6 0+6; 0+1 0+3; 0+1 0+1; 0+2 0+2; 0+2 0+0	+2:11.7
12	5	Belarus; Mikita Labastau; Iryna Kryuko; Mikita Labastau; Iryna Kryuko	38:59.7; 8:20.3; 9:12.5; 8:11.0; 13:15.9	0+4 0+3; 0+2 0+1; 0+1 0+0; 0+0 0+1; 0+1 0+1	+2:17.3
13	13	Slovenia; Jakov Fak; Polona Klemenčič; Jakov Fak; Polona Klemenčič	39:14.2; 7:52.2; 9:36.6; 8:06.3; 13:39.1	0+2 1+8; 0+1 0+1; 0+1 0+2; 0+0 1+3; 0+0 0+2	+2:31.8
14	18	Latvia; Aleksandrs Patrijuks; Baiba Bendika; Aleksandrs Patrijuks; Baiba Bendika	39:15.3; 8:16.6; 9:17.0; 9:01.6; 12:40.1	1+5 0+3; 0+1 0+1; 0+1 0+0; 1+3 0+2; 0+0 0+0	+2:32.9
15	12	Belgium; Florent Claude; Lotte Lie; Florent Claude; Lotte Lie	39:21.3; 8:14.2; 9:12.1; 8:15.1; 13:39.9	0+2 0+2; 0+1 0+0; 0+0 0+0; 0+1 0+0; 0+0 0+2	+2:38.9
16	26	Czech Republic; Mikuláš Karlík; Jessica Jislová; Mikuláš Karlík; Jessica Jislová	39:21.5; 8:22.8; 9:16.2; 8:36.2; 13:06.3	0+3 0+3; 0+0 0+2; 0+1 0+0; 0+2 0+1; 0+0 0+0	+2:39.1
17	10	Kazakhstan; Vladislav Kireyev; Galina Vishnevskaya-Sheporenko; Vladislav Kireyev; Galina Vishnevskaya-Sheporenko	39:27.1; 8:04.2; 9:11.5; 8:46.8; 13:24.6	0+2 0+1; 0+0 0+0; 0+0 0+0; 0+2 0+1; 0+0 0+0	+2:44.7
18	23	Japan; Mikito Tachizaki; Fuyuko Tachizaki; Mikito Tachizaki; Fuyuko Tachizaki	39:42.2; 8:19.2; 9:44.9; 8:14.4; 13:23.7	0+3 0+4; 0+1 0+1; 0+2 0+2; 0+0 0+1; 0+0 0+0	+2:59.8
19	27	Bulgaria; Vladimir Iliev; Milena Todorova; Vladimir Iliev; Milena Todorova	39:48.6; 8:58.8; 9:17.1; 8:26.5; 13:06.2	0+2 1+8; 0+2 1+3; 0+0 0+1; 0+0 0+3; 0+0 0+1	+3:06.2
20	21	Romania; George Buta; Elena Chirkova; George Buta; Elena Chirkova	39:54.5; 8:01.5; 9:33.8; 8:05.6; 14:13.6	0+4 0+3; 0+1 0+0; 0+1 0+1; 0+0 0+1; 0+2 0+1	+3:12.1
21	25	Slovakia; Tomáš Hasilla; Paulína Fialková; Tomáš Hasilla; Paulína Fialková	40:02.5; 8:09.1; 9:46.9; 8:55.4; 13:11.1	0+7 0+7; 0+1 0+1; 0+2 0+3; 0+3 0+3; 0+1 0+0	+3:20.1
22	11	United States; Sean Doherty; Clare Egan; Sean Doherty; Clare Egan	40:14.1; 8:02.2; 9:56.6; 8:27.9; 13:47.4	0+3 1+5; 0+1 0+0; 0+0 1+3; 0+0 0+2; 0+2 0+0	+3:31.7
23	28	South Korea; Kim Yong-gyu; Ekaterina Avvakumova; Kim Yong-gyu; Ekaterina Avvakumova	40:38.2; 8:46.1; 9:09.0; 9:12.6; 13:30.5	0+5 0+7; 0+3 0+3; 0+0 0+1; 0+1 0+3; 0+1 0+0	+3:55.8
24	15	Lithuania; Tomas Kaukėnas; Natalija Kočergina; Tomas Kaukėnas; Natalija Kočergina	40:58.9; 8:09.7; 9:30.0; 8:51.3; 14:27.9	0+6 0+10; 0+0 0+2; 0+1 0+2; 0+2 0+3; 0+3 0+3	+4:16.5
25	19	Finland; Jaakko Ranta; Mari Eder; Jaakko Ranta; Mari Eder	41:01.0; 8:31.3; 9:43.3; 8:59.0; 13:47.4	1+8 1+8; 0+2 0+3; 1+3 0+1; 0+1 1+3; 0+2 0+1	+4:18.6
26	20	Poland; Grzegorz Guzik; Kamila Żuk; Grzegorz Guzik; Kamila Żuk	41:11.6; 8:40.9; 10:34.8; 8:19.4; 13:36.5	2+8 0+4; 0+3 0+1; 2+3 0+2; 0+1 0+0; 0+1 0+1	+4:29.2
27	22	Moldova; Mihail Usov; Alla Ghilenko; Mihail Usov; Alla Ghilenko	42:04.8; 8:39.0; 9:46.4; 9:32.7; 14:06.7	2+8 0+6; 0+2 0+1; 0+3 0+3; 2+3 0+1; 0+0 0+1	+5:22.4
28	24	Croatia; Krešimir Crnković; Anika Kožica; Krešimir Crnković; Anika Kožica	LAP; 8:36.8; 10:05.2; 9:29.0	0+6 2+6; 0+1 0+2; 0+1 0+1; 0+1 2+3; 0+3	
