= Hruštín =

- Municipality
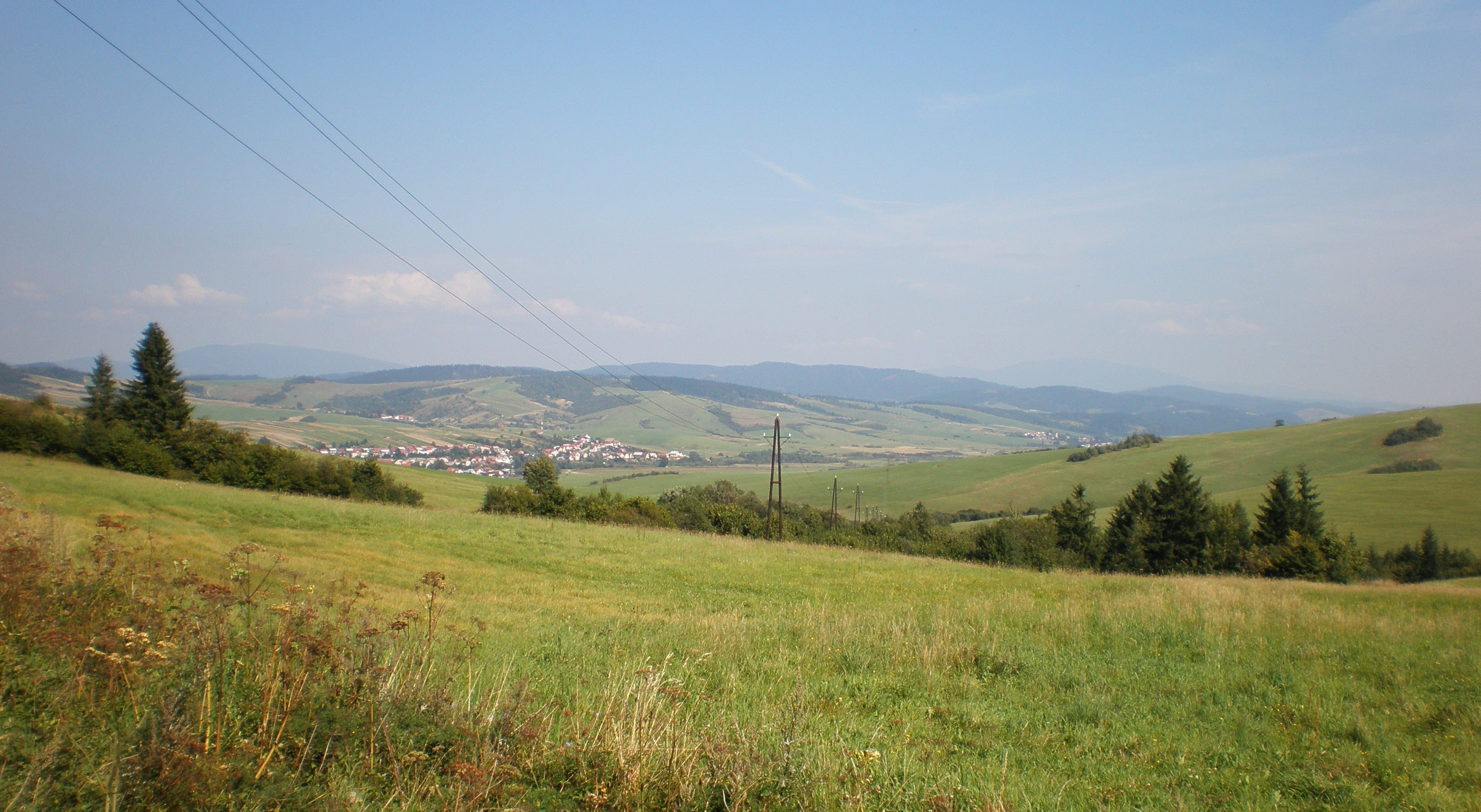

- Flag

- Location of Hruštín in the Žilina Region Location of Hruštín in Slovakia
- Coordinates: 49.32°N 19.35°E
- Country: Slovakia
- Region: Žilina Region
- District: Námestovo District
- First mentioned: 1580

Area
  - Total: 36.48 km^{2} (14.09 sq mi)
- Elevation: 704 m (2,310 ft)

Population (2025)
  - Total: 3,162
- Time zone: UTC+1 (CET)
  - Summer (DST): UTC+2 (CEST)
- Postal code: 295 2
- Area code: +421 43
- Vehicle registration plate (until 2022): NO
- Website: www.hrustin.sk

Hruštín (Hungarian: Hrustin) is a village and municipality in Námestovo District in the Žilina Region of northern Slovakia.

== History ==
In historical records the village was first mentioned in 1580.

== Geography ==
The municipality lies at an altitude of 704 metres (2,310 ft) and covers an area of 36.48 km^{2} (14.09 sq mi) (2025).

== Population ==
Population statistic (10 years)
Year	1995	2005	2015	2025
Count	3075	3212	3175	3162
Difference		+4.45%	−1.15%	−0.40%

Population statistic
Year	2024	2025
Count	3184	3162
Difference		−0.69%

It has a population of 3162 people (31 December 2025).

=== Ethnicity ===
Census 2021 (1+ %)
Ethnicity	Number	Fraction
Slovak	3154	99.27%
Total	3177	

In year 2021 was 3177 people by ethnicity 3154 as Slovak, 23 as Not found out, 14 as Czech, 4 as Polish, 4 as Other, 2 as Russian, 2 as Hungarian, 1 as Ukrainian, 1 as Serbian and 1 as Romani.

Note on population: The difference values of population numbers in the table "Population statistic" and in the sections "Ethnicity" & "Religion" is caused by the use of various statistical methods.

=== Religion ===
Census 2021 (1+ %)
Religion	Number	Fraction
Roman Catholic Church	2954	92.98%
None	160	5.04%
Total	3177	

In year 2021 was 3177 people by religion 2954 from Roman Catholic Church, 160 from None, 18 from Not found out, 12 from Greek Catholic Church, 12 from Evangelical Church, 9 from Ad hoc movements, 3 from Eastern Orthodox Church, 3 from Buddhism, 2 from Calvinist Church, 2 from Other, 1 from Paganism and natural spirituality and 1 from Christian Congregations in Slovakia.

== Genealogical resources ==
The records for genealogical research are available at the state archive "Statny Archiv in Bytca, Slovakia"

- Roman Catholic church records (births/marriages/deaths): 1788-1922 (parish A)

== Notable people ==
- Zuzana Remeňová (born 2000) - biathlete; grew up in Hruštín

== See also ==
- List of municipalities and towns in Slovakia
