= Zuzana Remeňová =

Slovak biathlete (born 2000)

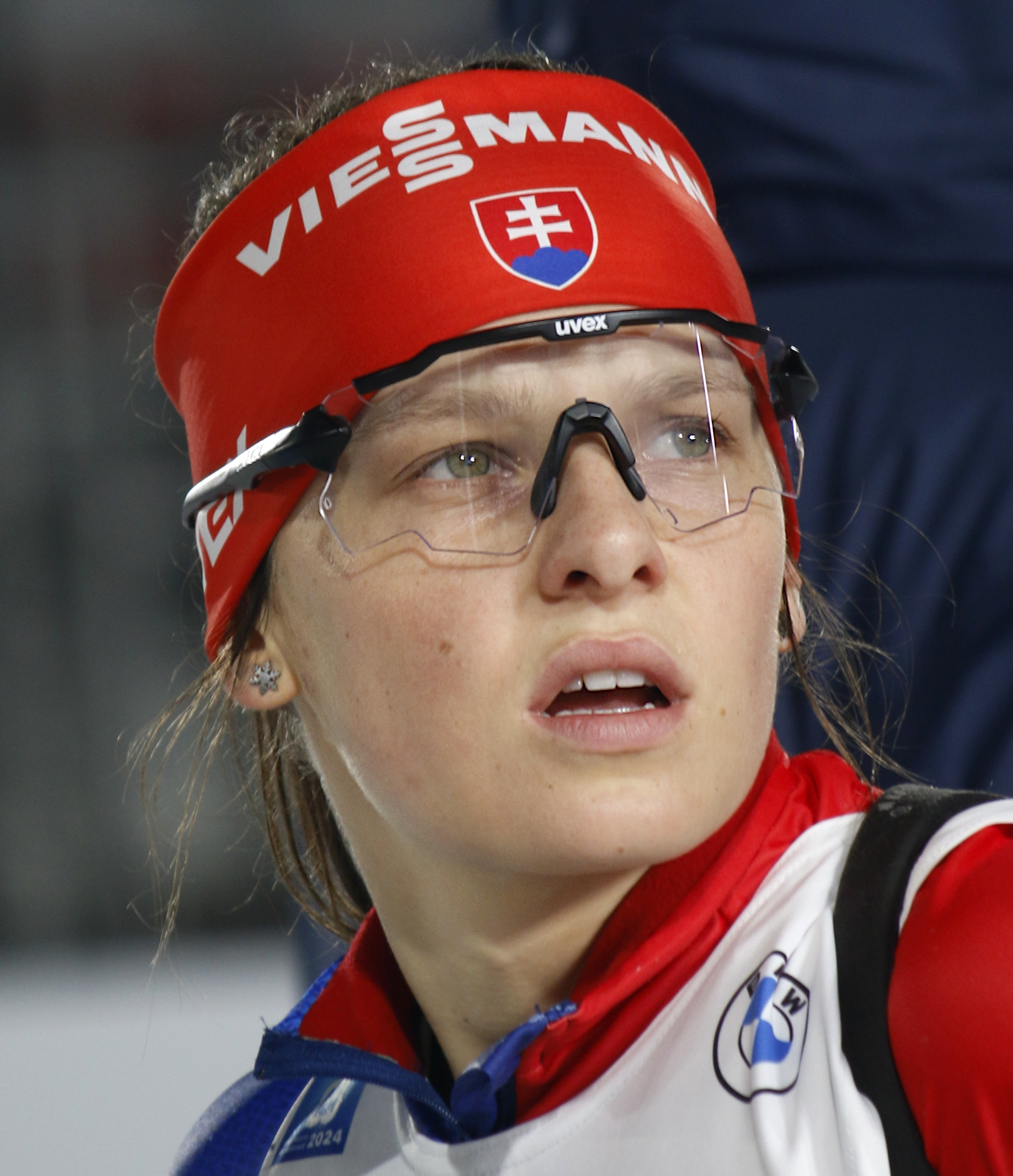
- Remeňová in 2024

Personal information
- Born: 27 July 2000 (age 26) Dolný Kubín, Slovakia

Sport

Professional information
- Sport: Biathlon
- Club: ŠK Zeleziarne Podbrezová
- World Cup debut: 2023

Zuzana Remeňová (born 27 July 2000) is a Slovak biathlete.

== Biography ==
Zuzana Remeňová was born on 27 July 2000 in Dolný Kubín. She grew up in the village of Hruštín in the Námestovo District.

She made her senior World Cup debut in relay at Hochfilzen together with her twin sister Mária. Individually, she debuted at the Biathlon World Championships 2023 in Oberhof, Germany, where she placed 75th. She also competed in the 2023–24 Biathlon World Cup, where she won her first individual points on 1 March 2024 for the 22nd place at the race in Oslo.
