= Lisa Vittozzi =

Italian biathlete (born 1995)

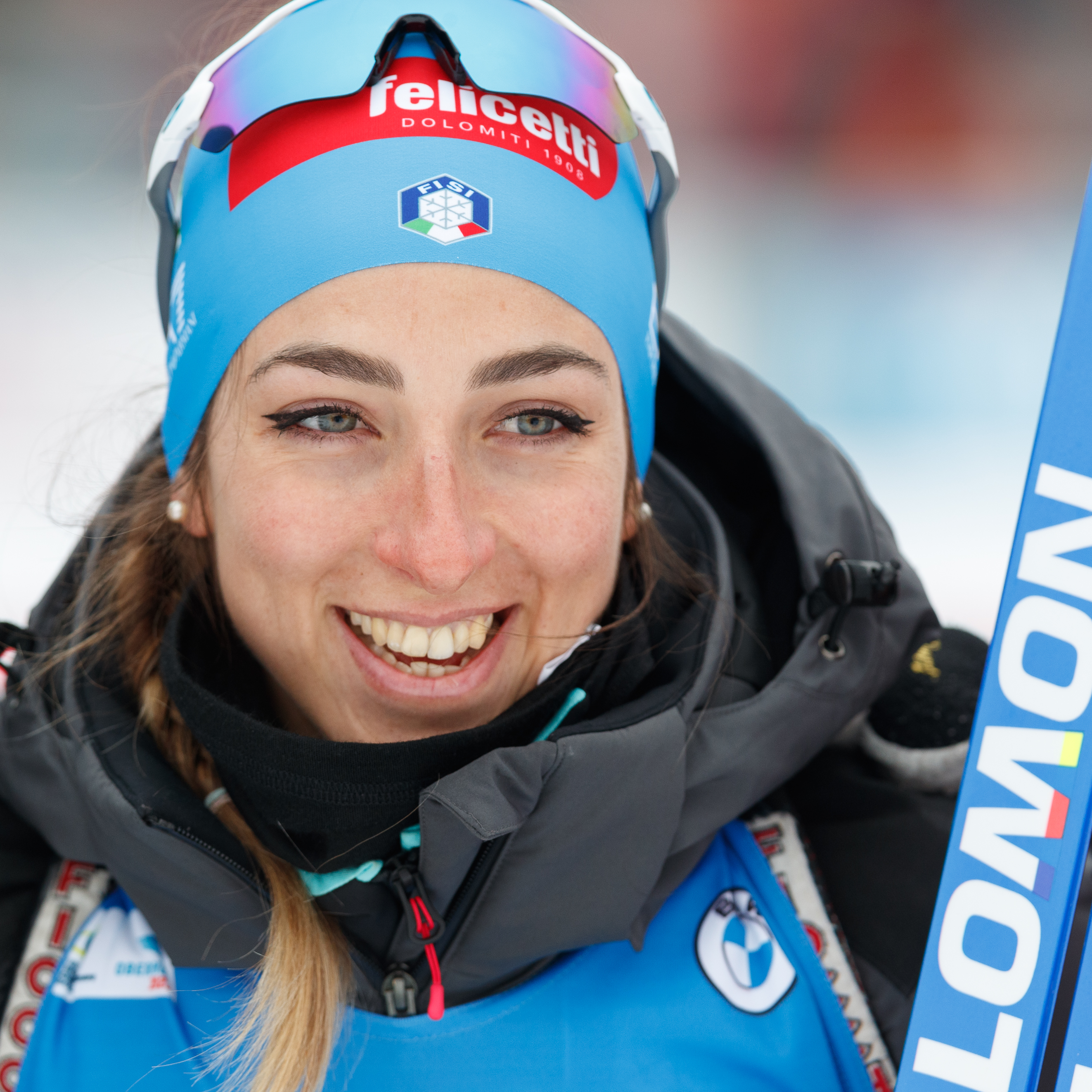
- Vittozzi in 2023

Personal information
- Nationality: Italian
- Born: 4 February 1995 (age 31) Pieve di Cadore, Italy
- Height: 1.76 m (5 ft 9 in)

Sport

Professional information
- Sport: Biathlon
- Club: G.S. Forestale; C.S. Carabinieri
- World Cup debut: 2014

Olympic Games
- Teams: 3 (2018, 2022, 2026)
- Medals: 3 (1 gold)

World Championships
- Teams: 8 (2015–2024)
- Medals: 12 (2 gold)

World Cup
- Individual victories: 10 (Note: Excluding 1 win at the Biathlon WCH and 1 at the Biathlon WOG that was not part of the WC)
- All victories: 15 (Note: Excluding 2 wins at the Biathlon WCH and 1 at the Biathlon WOG that were not part of the WC)
- Individual podiums: 34 (Note: Including 1 podium at the Biathlon WCH that was part of the WC, excluding 4 podiums at the Biathlon WCH and 1 at the Biathlon WOG that were not part of the WC)
- All podiums: 59 (Note: Including 4 podiums at the Biathlon WCH that were part of the WC, excluding 8 podiums at the Biathlon WCH and 3 at the Biathlon WOG that were not part of the WC)
- Overall titles: 1 (2023-24)
- Discipline titles: 4: 3 Individual (2018–19, 2022-23, 2023-24); 1 Pursuit (2023–24)
Medal record
Women's biathlon
Representing Italy
Event	1st	2nd	3rd
Olympic Games	1	1	1
World Championships	2	6	4
Total	3	7	5
Olympic Games
Gold medal – first place	2026 Milano Cortina	10 km pursuit
Silver medal – second place	2026 Milano Cortina	Mixed relay
Bronze medal – third place	2018 Pyeongchang	Mixed relay
World Championships
Gold medal – first place	2023 Oberhof	4 × 6 km relay
Gold medal – first place	2024 Nové Město	15 km individual
Silver medal – second place	2019 Östersund	15 km individual
Silver medal – second place	2020 Antholz	Mixed relay
Silver medal – second place	2023 Oberhof	Mixed relay
Silver medal – second place	2024 Nové Město	10 km pursuit
Silver medal – second place	2024 Nové Město	12.5 km mass start
Silver medal – second place	2024 Nové Město	Single mixed relay
Bronze medal – third place	2015 Kontiolahti	4 × 6 km relay
Bronze medal – third place	2019 Östersund	Mixed relay
Bronze medal – third place	2023 Oberhof	15 km individual
Bronze medal – third place	2023 Oberhof	Single mixed relay
Youth World Championships
Gold medal – first place	2014 Presque Isle	6 km sprint
Gold medal – first place	2014 Presque Isle	7.5 km pursuit
Silver medal – second place	2013 Obertilliach	6 km sprint
Silver medal – second place	2014 Presque Isle	10 km individual

Lisa Vittozzi (born 4 February 1995) is an Italian biathlete. She is the 2026 Olympic champion in the 10 km pursuit, a two-time World Championships gold medallist, and the winner of the 2023-2024 World Cup.

== Biathlon results ==
All results are sourced from the International Biathlon Union.

=== Olympic Games ===
3 medals (1 gold, 1 silver, 1 bronze)

Year	Age	Individual	Sprint	Pursuit	Mass start	Relay	Mixed relay
(South Korea) 2018 Pyeongchang	23	32nd	6th	11th	4th	9th	Bronze
(China) 2022 Beijing	27	76th	36th	32nd	—	5th	9th
(Italy) 2026 Milano Cortina	31	37th	5th	Gold	18th	11th	Silver

=== World Championships ===
12 medals (2 gold, 6 silver, 4 bronze)

Year	Age	Individual	Sprint	Pursuit	Mass start	Relay	Mixed relay	Single mixed relay
(Finland) 2015 Kontiolahti	20	—	60th	41st	—	Bronze	—	—N/a
(Norway) 2016 Oslo	21	—	20th	13th	17th	7th	—	—N/a
(Austria) 2017 Hochfilzen	22	36th	4th	14th	11th	5th	4th	—N/a
(Sweden) 2019 Östersund	24	Silver	21st	10th	8th	10th	Bronze	—
(Italy) 2020 Antholz-Anterselva	25	71st	6th	27th	30th	10th	Silver	—
(Slovenia) 2021 Pokljuka	26	38th	5th	48th	5th	9th	6th	—
(Germany) 2023 Oberhof	28	Bronze	5th	DNS	22nd	Gold	Silver	Bronze
(Czech Republic) 2024 Nové Město	29	Gold	7th	Silver	Silver	11th	10th	Silver

*During Olympic seasons competitions are only held for those events not included in the Olympic program.
**The single mixed relay was added as an event in 2019.

=== World Cup ===
Season	Age	Overall		Individual		Sprint		Pursuit		Mass start	
Season	Age	Points	Position	Points	Position	Points	Position	Points	Position	Points	Position
2014–15	20	46	66th	0	–	32	61st	14	59th	0	—
2015–16	21	161	39th	0	–	74	34th	63	40th	24	39th
2016–17	22	344	27th	5	67th	130	22nd	177	14th	30	36th
2017–18	23	588	6th	43	18th	230	7th	191	8th	125	12th
2018–19	24	882	2nd	140	1st	309	4th	301	4th	132	12th
2019–20	25	528	10th	75	12th	214	7th	104	15th	135	10th
2020–21	26	449	16th	31	34th	206	14th	83	31st	97	19th
2021–22	27	246	31st	28	24th	115	27th	77	30th	26	35th
2022–23	28	882	3rd	225	1st	236	6th	279	4th	142	7th
2023–24	29	1091	1st	165	1st	283	3rd	398	1st	135	6th
2024–25	30	(did not compete due to injury)									
2025–26	31	935	3rd	95	7th	323	3rd	331	4th	186	2nd

=== Individual podiums ===
- 12 victories (3 Individuals, 2 Sprints, 6 Pursuits, 1 Mass Starts)
- 39 podiums (8 Individuals, 12 Sprints, 13 Pursuits, 6 Mass starts)

No.	Season	Date	Location	Race	Level	Placement
1	2016–17	11 March 2017	Kontiolahti, Finland	10 km Pursuit	World Cup	3rd
2	2017–18	16 December 2017	Annecy, France	10 km Pursuit	World Cup	3rd
3	2017–18	9 March 2018	Kontiolahti, Finland	7.5 km Sprint	World Cup	3rd
4	2017–18	11 March 2018	Kontiolahti, Finland	12.5 km Mass start	World Cup	2nd
5	2018–19	10 January 2019	Oberhof, Germany	7.5 km Sprint	World Cup	1st
6	2018–19	12 January 2019	Oberhof, Germany	10 km Pursuit	World Cup	1st
7	2018–19	17 January 2019	Ruhpolding, Germany	7.5 km Sprint	World Cup	2nd
8	2018–19	26 January 2019	Antholz, Italy	10 km Pursuit	World Cup	3rd
9	2018–19	7 February 2019	Canmore, Canada	12.5 km Short Individual	World Cup	3rd
10	2018–19	12 March 2019	Östersund, Sweden	15 km Individual	World Championships	Silver
11	2019–20	26 January 2020	Pokljuka, Slovenia	12.5 km Mass start	World Cup	2nd
12	2019–20	14 March 2020	Kontiolahti, Finland	10 km Pursuit	World Cup	3rd
13	2020–21	6 March 2021	Nové Město, Czech Republic	7.5 km Sprint	World Cup	3rd
14	2022–23	30 November 2022	Kontiolahti, Finland	15 km Individual	World Cup	3rd
15	2022–23	3 December 2022	Kontiolahti, Finland	7.5 km Sprint	World Cup	2nd
16	2022–23	17 December 2022	Annecy, France	10 km Pursuit	World Cup	2nd
17	2022–23	12 January 2023	Ruhpolding, Germany	15 km Individual	World Cup	1st
18	2022–23	15 January 2023	Ruhpolding, Germany	12.5 km Mass start	World Cup	2nd
19	2022–23	21 January 2023	Antholz, Italy	10 km Pursuit	World Cup	2nd
20	2022–23	15 February 2023	Oberhof, Germany	15 km Individual	World Championships	Bronze
21	2022–23	9 March 2023	Östersund, Sweden	15 km Individual	World Cup	2nd
22	2023–24	26 November 2023	Östersund, Sweden	15 km Individual	World Cup	1st
23	2023–24	14 December 2023	Lenzerheide, Switzerland	7.5 km Sprint	World Cup	3rd
24	2023–24	12 January 2024	Ruhpolding, Germany	7.5 km Sprint	World Cup	3rd
25	2023–24	14 January 2024	Ruhpolding, Germany	10 km Pursuit	World Cup	1st
26	2023–24	11 February 2024	Nové Město, Czech Republic	10 km Pursuit	World Championships	Silver
27	2023–24	13 February 2024	Nové Město, Czech Republic	15 km Individual	World Championships	Gold
28	2023–24	18 February 2024	Nové Město, Czech Republic	12.5 km Mass start	World Championships	Silver
29	2023–24	10 March 2024	Soldier Hollow, United States	10 km Pursuit	World Cup	2nd
30	2023–24	14 March 2024	Canmore, Canada	7.5 km Sprint	World Cup	1st
31	2023–24	16 March 2024	Canmore, Canada	10 km Pursuit	World Cup	1st
32	2025–26	14 December 2025	Hochfilzen, Austria	10 km Pursuit	World Cup	1st
33	2025–26	16 January 2026	Ruhpolding, Germany	7.5 km Sprint	World Cup	3rd
34	2025–26	26 January 2026	Nové Město, Czech Republic	12.5 km Mass Start	World Cup	3rd
35	2025–26	15 February 2026	(Italy) Milano Cortina - Antholz/Anterselva	10 km Pursuit	(International Olympic Committee) Winter Olympic Games	Gold
36	2025–26	13 March 2026	Otepää, Estonia	7.5 km Sprint	World Cup	2nd
37	2025–26	14 March 2026	Otepää, Estonia	10 km Pursuit	World Cup	1st
38	2025–26	19 March 2026	Oslo Holmenkollen, Norway	7.5 km Sprint	World Cup	2nd
39	2025–26	22 March 2026	Oslo Holmenkollen, Norway	12.5 km Mass Start	World Cup	1st

*Results are from IBU races which include the Biathlon World Cup, Biathlon World Championships and the Winter Olympic Games.

==== Relay podiums ====
- 6 victories (3 Women relays, 3 Mixed relays)
- 31 podiums (13 Women relays, 16 Mixed relays, 2 Single mixed relay)

No.	Season	Date	Location	Level	Placement	Teammate
1	2014–15	13 March 2015	(Finland) Kontiolahti	World Championships	Bronze	Oberhofer, Gontier, Wierer
2	2015–16	13 December 2015	(Austria) Hochfilzen	World Cup	1st	Oberhofer, Sanfilippo, Wierer
3	2015–16	17 January 2016	(Germany) Ruhpolding	World Cup	3rd	Oberhofer, Runggaldier, Wierer
4	2016–17	27 November 2017	(Sweden) Östersund	World Cup	3rd	Wierer, Hofer, Windisch
5	2016–17	22 January 2017	(Italy) Antholz-Anterselva	World Cup	3rd	Runggaldier, Sanfilippo, Wierer
6	2017–18	26 November 2017	(Sweden) Östersund	World Cup	2nd	Wierer, Hofer, Windisch
7	2017–18	13 January 2018	(Germany) Ruhpolding	World Cup	2nd	Gontier, Sanfilippo, Wierer
8	2017–18	20 February 2018	(South Korea) Pyeongchang	(International Olympic Committee) Winter Olympic Games	3rd	Wierer, Hofer, Windisch
9	2017–18	10 March 2018	(Finland) Kontiolahti	World Cup	1st	Wierer, Hofer, Windisch
10	2017–18	18 March 2018	(Norway) Oslo Holmenkollen	World Cup	3rd	Gontier, Sanfilippo, Wierer
11	2018–19	2 December 2018	(Slovenia) Pokljuka	World Cup	3rd	Wierer, Hofer, Windisch
12	2018–19	16 December 2018	(Austria) Hochfilzen	World Cup	1st	Runggaldier, Wierer, Sanfilippo
13	2018–19	7 March 2019	(Sweden) Östersund	World Championships	Bronze	Wierer, Hofer, Windisch
14	2019–20	30 November 2019	(Sweden) Östersund	World Cup	1st	Wierer, Hofer, Windisch
15	2019–20	13 February 2020	(Italy) Antholz-Anterselva	World Championships	Silver	Wierer, Hofer, Windisch
16	2020–21	14 March 2021	(Czech Republic) Nové Město	World Cup	2nd	Wierer, Windisch, Hofer
17	2021–22	3 March 2022	(Finland) Kontiolahti	World Cup	3rd	Comola, Sanfilippo, Wierer
18	2022–23	11 December 2022	(Austria) Hochfilzen	World Cup	3rd	Rebecca Passler, Comola, Wierer
19	2022–23	8 January 2023	(Slovenia) Pokljuka	World Cup	2nd	Bionaz, Giacomel, Wierer
20	2022–23	14 January 2023	(Germany) Ruhpolding	World Cup	3rd	Comola, Passler, Wierer
21	2022–23	8 February 2023	(Germany) Oberhof	World Championships	Silver	Bionaz, Giacomel, Wierer
22	2022–23	16 February 2023	(Germany) Oberhof	World Championships	Bronze	Giacomel
23	2022–23	18 February 2023	(Germany) Oberhof	World Championships	Gold	Comola, Auchentaller, Wierer
24	2023–24	25 November 2023	(Sweden) Östersund	World Cup	3rd	Bionaz, Giacomel, Wierer
25	2023–24	20 January 2024	(Italy) Antholz-Anterselva	World Cup	2nd	Wierer, Bionaz, Giacomel
26	2023–24	15 February 2024	(Czech Republic) Nové Město	World Championships	Silver	Giacomel
27	2025-26	29 November 2025	(Sweden) Östersund	World Cup	2nd	Carrara, Wierer, Auchentaller
28	2025-26	30 November 2025	(Sweden) Östersund	World Cup	2nd	Giacomel, Hofer, Wierer
29	2025-26	14 January 2026	(Germany) Ruhpolding	World Cup	2nd	Auchentaller, Wierer, Carrara
30	2025-26	24 January 2026	(Czech Republic) Nové Město na Moravě	World Cup	1st	Wierer, Hofer, Giacomel
31	2025-26	8 February 2026	(Italy) Milano Cortina - Antholz/Anterselva	(International Olympic Committee) Winter Olympic Games	2nd	Giacomel, Hofer, Wierer

Updated on 22 March 2026

== Notes ==
Notes about WC results
