= Justine Braisaz-Bouchet =

French biathlete (born 1996)

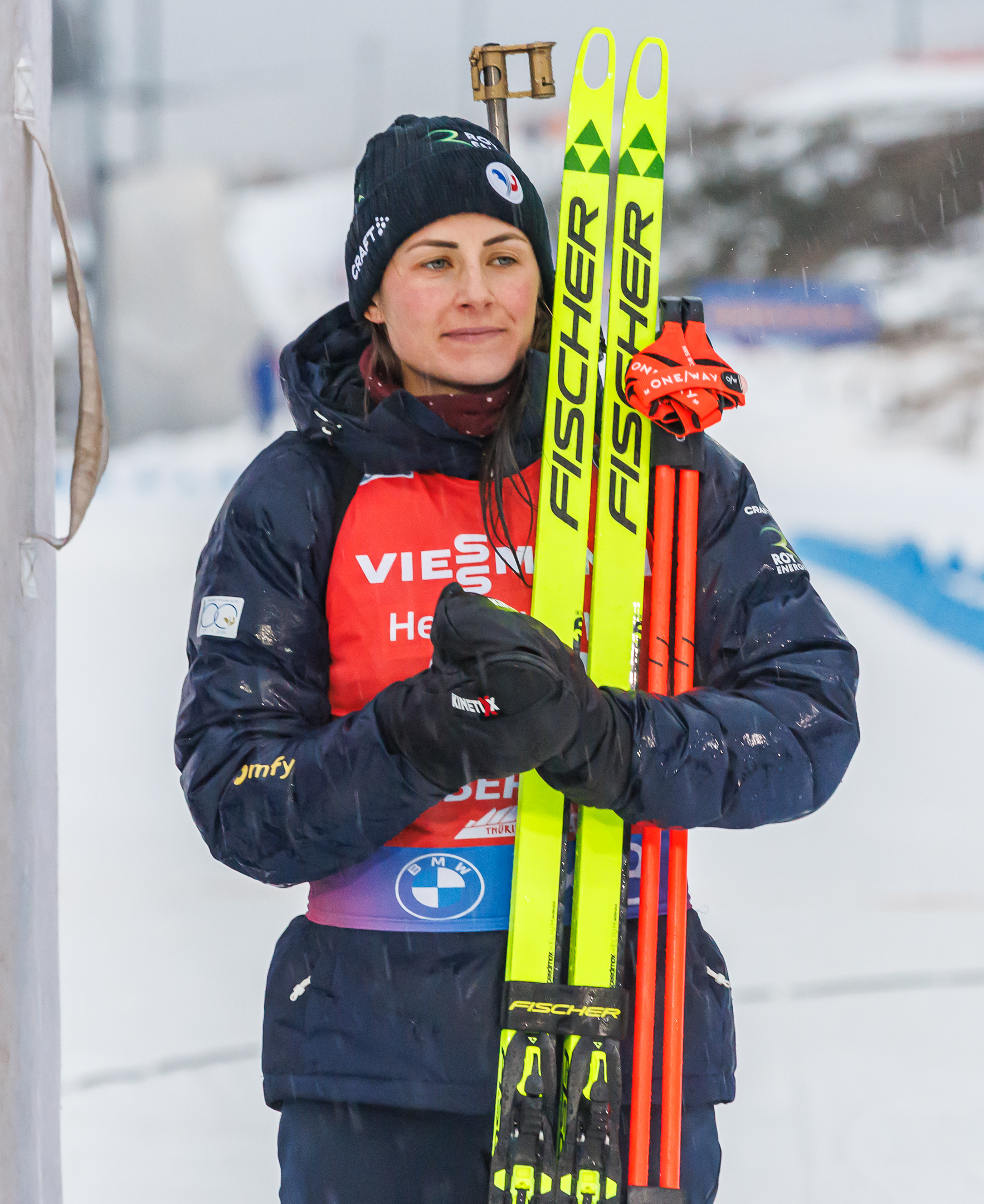
- Braisaz-Bouchet in 2025

Personal information
- Nationality: French
- Born: 4 July 1996 (age 30) Albertville, France
- Height: 1.73 m (5 ft 8 in)
- Weight: 58 kg (128 lb)

Sport

Professional information
- Sport: Biathlon
- Club: Les Saisies
- World Cup debut: 12 December 2014

Olympic Games
- Teams: 3 (2018, 2022, 2026)
- Medals: 2 (1 gold)

World Championships
- Teams: 8 (2015–2021, 2024, 2025)
- Medals: 12 (5 gold)

World Cup
- Seasons: 10 (2014/15–2021/22; 2023/24)
- Individual victories: 12
- All victories: 23
- Discipline titles: 1: 1 Mass Start (2021–22)
Medal record
Women's biathlon
Representing France
Olympic Games
Gold medal – first place	2022 Beijing	12.5 km mass start
Bronze medal – third place	2018 Pyeongchang	4 × 6 km relay
World Championships
Gold medal – first place	2024 Nové Město	12.5 km mass start
Gold medal – first place	2024 Nové Město	4 × 6 km relay
Gold medal – first place	2024 Nové Město	Mixed relay
Gold medal – first place	2025 Lenzerheide	7.5 km sprint
Gold medal – first place	2025 Lenzerheide	4 × 6 km relay
Silver medal – second place	2015 Kontiolahti	4 × 6 km relay
Silver medal – second place	2016 Oslo	4 × 6 km relay
Silver medal – second place	2024 Nové Město	7.5 km sprint
Bronze medal – third place	2017 Hochfilzen	4 × 6 km relay
Bronze medal – third place	2019 Östersund	15 km individual
Bronze medal – third place	2024 Nové Město	10 km pursuit
Bronze medal – third place	2025 Lenzerheide	10 km pursuit

Justine Braisaz-Bouchet (born 4 July 1996) is a French biathlete, Olympic champion in the 12.5 km mass start at the 2022 Beijing Games and medalist at the Winter Olympics 2018 and World Championships.

== Biography ==
Justine Braisaz began her biathlon career at the Saisies Sports Club. She quickly moved to the Nordic section to practice cross-country skiing and biathlon. During the 2011/2012 season, in the Cadette U16 category, she won the French Championship of cross-country skiing and the French Championship of Biathlon, thanks to her speed on skis. She moved to Biathlon fully in the following year representing the Junior category (U19).

During the 2012/2013 season, the first year in this category, Justine Braisaz was selected for the 2013 Junior World Championships in Obertilliach, Austria. She finished 46th in the individual race and 71st in the sprint.

The following year, she was promoted to the highest class at the Junior World Championships in Presque Isle (USA). She finished the individual race ranked 29th, 5th place in the sprint, and 15th in pursuit. In the relay, she placed 6th with partners Coline Varcin and Chloé Chevalier.

In the same year (2012/2013), she participated in the European Championships held in Nové Město, Czech Republic. She ranked 12th in the individual race, 18th in the sprint, 14th in the pursuit, and 8th in the mixed relay with Chloé Chevalier, Dany Chavoutier, and Clément Dumont. At the French Championships held in Prémanon in December 2013, she won two French Champion titles (Sprint and Pursuit). In March, she climbed into second place in the Mass Start behind Julie Cardon during the French Biathlon Championships. Her progress was of such a magnitude that she managed to earn her place to compete with the best French biathletes in the summer events of the Biathlon Summer Tour.

For the 2014/2015 season, she joined the French Youth / Junior Biathlon Team. In the first stage of the 2014/2015 season of the IBU Cup in Beitostølen, Norway, Justine Braisaz took her first podium finish with a second place in the second sprint. The day before, she finished 10th in the sprint event. This was her first international podium, and as a result, she was selected for the Biathlon World Cup.

Justine Braisaz made her Biathlon World Cup debut on 12 December 2014 in Hochfilzen (2014/2015 season), Norway. She ranked 17th in the sprint, becoming the youngest athlete in the world's top 20. The next day she placed 9th in the relay with her French teammates; Marine Bolliet, Enora Latuillière, and Anaïs Bescond. A week later, she improved her best performance by finishing 14th in the Pokljuka sprint and qualifying for the Mass Start with the top 30 biathletes. She set a new record by becoming the youngest athlete lined up on a Mass Start at only 18 years and 5 months.

She earned her first podium in her World Cup career in Oberhof, Germany, by achieving second place in the women's relay on 7 January 2015 with her teammates; Marine Bolliet, Marie Dorin-Habert and Anaïs Bescond. On 13 March 2015, at the 2015 World Championships in Kontiolahti, Finland, she won her first medal, silver, for the women's 4 x 6 km relay with Anaïs Bescond, Enora Latuillière and Marie Dorin-Habert. At the French Biathlon Championships in La Féclaz, she won the relay title with Julia Simon and Marine Bolliet. The following year, at the world championships in Oslo, Norway, she won another silver medal in the same event with Anaïs Bescond, Anaïs Chevalier, and Marie Dorin-Habert. She also achieved her best individual result when she finished 12th place in the Mass Start Competition. A week later, at the final round of the IBU World Cup season in Khanty-Mansiysk, Russia, she earned her first top 10 result with a 4th-place finish in the sprint event. She finished the season with a 10th-place finish in the pursuit event, which allowed her to finish her second world cup season in the 21st position overall.

At the 2016 Biathlon Championships in Méribel, France, she earned the title of French Champion by winning the Mass Start even in the U21 category. During the preseason 2016–2017, she won the sprint at the Norwegian Championships in Sjusjøen, Norway, ahead of Norway's Tiril Eckhoff and Ukraine's Julia Dzhyma. She won her first individual World Cup podium on 9 December 2016, at the Pokljuka (Slovenia) sprint, the second event of the World Cup, finishing second by 3 seconds behind Germany's Laura Dahlmeier: she was only 20 years old.

== Biathlon results ==
All results are sourced from the International Biathlon Union.

=== Olympic Games ===
2 medals (1 gold, 1 bronze)

Event	Individual	Sprint	Pursuit	Mass start	Relay	Mixed relay
(South Korea) 2018 Pyeongchang	55th	10th	34th	20th	Bronze	—
(China) 2022 Beijing	40th	48th	DNS	Gold	6th	—
(Italy) 2026 Milano Cortina	80th	62nd	DNS	27th	—	—

=== World Championships ===
11 medals (4 gold, 3 silver, 4 bronze)

Event	Individual	Sprint	Pursuit	Mass start	Relay	Mixed relay	Single mixed relay
(Finland) 2015 Kontiolahti	34th	34th	35th	—	Silver	—	—N/a
(Norway) 2016 Oslo Holmenkollen	16th	25th	22nd	12th	Silver	—	—N/a
(Austria) 2017 Hochfilzen	48th	28th	5th	28th	Bronze	—	—N/a
(Sweden) 2019 Östersund	Bronze	60th	DNS	15th	8th	—	—
(Italy) 2020 Antholz-Anterselva	19th	32nd	37th	22nd	14th	7th	—
(Slovenia) 2021 Pokljuka	63rd	25th	30th	28th	—	—	—
(Czech Republic) 2024 Nové Město	7th	Silver	Bronze	Gold	Gold	Gold	—
(Switzerland) 2025 Lenzerheide	9th	Gold	Bronze	10th	Gold	—	—

*The single mixed relay was added as an event in 2019.

=== Junior/Youth World Championships ===
Event	Class	Individual	Sprint	Pursuit	Relay
(Austria) 2013 Obertilliach	Youth	46th	71st	—	—
(United States) 2014 Presque Isle	Junior	29th	5th	15th	6th

=== World Cup ===
World Cup rankings

Season	Overall			Individual			Sprint			Pursuit			Mass start		
Season	Races	Points	Position	Races	Points	Position	Races	Points	Position	Races	Points	Position	Races	Points	Position
2014–15	13/25	114	51st	2/3	8	61st	8/10	85	39th	2/7	17	57th	1/5	4	51st
2015–16	21/25	372	21st	3/3	40	24th	9/9	168	17th	7/8	123	21st	2/5	41	31st
2016–17	25/26	706	6th	3/3	63	15th	9/9	281	5th	8/9	250	6th	5/5	112	15th
2017–18	15/22	419	17th	1/2	34	20th	6/8	163	13th	5/7	133	13th	3/5	89	20th
2018–19	24/25	352	26th	3/3	61	15th	9/9	118	27th	7/8	73	36th	5/5	100	19th
2019–20	21/21	547	9th	3/3	112	3rd	8/8	166	12th	5/5	137	9th	5/5	136	9th
2020–21	26/26	511	15th	3/3	-	-	10/10	209	13th	8/8	163	15th	5/5	113	12th
2021–22	22/22	581	8th	2/2	63	6th	9/9	206	12th	7/7	153	16th	4/4	162	1st
2022–23	(did not compete due to pregnancy)														
2023–24	21/21	1025	4th	3/3	56	15th	7/7	410	2nd	7/7	357	4th	4/4	202	4th
2024–25	21/21	657	8th	3/3	56	17th	7/7	318	3rd	6/6	181	9th	5/5	102	17th
2025–26	21/21	597	11th	3/3	90	8th	7/7	149	11th	7/7	254	7th	4/4	104	12th

Individual podiums

- 14 victories (3 In, 5 Sp, 1 Pu, 5 MS); victories at Winter Olympics are not counted as World Cup victories, but are listed here.
- 31 podiums

No.	Season	Date	Location	Discipline	Level	Place
1	2016–17	9 December 2016	(Slovenia) Pokljuka	7.5 km Sprint	Biathlon World Cup	2nd
2	2016–17	17 March 2017	(Norway) Oslo Holmenkollen	7.5 km Sprint	Biathlon World Cup	2nd
3	2016–17	18 March 2017	(Norway) Oslo Holmenkollen	10 km Pursuit	Biathlon World Cup	3rd
4	2017–18	1 December 2017	(Sweden) Östersund	7.5 km Sprint	Biathlon World Cup	2nd
5	2017–18	3 December 2017	(Sweden) Östersund	10 km Pursuit	Biathlon World Cup	2nd
6	2017–18	17 December 2017	(France) Annecy-Le Grand-Bornand	12.5 km Mass Start	Biathlon World Cup	1st
7	2018–19	8 December 2018	(Slovenia) Pokljuka	7.5 km Sprint	Biathlon World Cup	3rd
8	2018–19	12 March 2019	(Sweden) Östersund	15 km Individual	Biathlon World Championships	3rd
9	2019–20	5 December 2019	(Sweden) Östersund	15 km Individual	Biathlon World Cup	1st
10	2019–20	20 December 2019	(France) Annecy-Le Grand-Bornand	7.5 km Sprint	Biathlon World Cup	2nd
11	2021–22	10 December 2021	(Austria) Hochfilzen	7.5 km Sprint	Biathlon World Cup	2nd
12	2021–22	21 January 2022	(Italy) Antholz-Anterselva	15 km Individual	Biathlon World Cup	1st
13	2021–22	18 February 2022	(China) Beijing	12.5 km Mass Start	Winter Olympic Games	1st
14	2021–22	20 March 2022	(Norway) Oslo Holmenkollen	12.5 km Mass Start	Biathlon World Cup	1st
15	2023–24	8 December 2023	(Austria) Hochfilzen	7.5 km Sprint	Biathlon World Cup	3rd
16	2023–24	14 December 2023	(Switzerland) Lenzerheide	7.5 km Sprint	Biathlon World Cup	1st
17	2023–24	16 December 2023	(Switzerland) Lenzerheide	10 km Pursuit	Biathlon World Cup	1st
18	2023–24	17 December 2023	(Switzerland) Lenzerheide	12.5 km Mass Start	Biathlon World Cup	1st
19	2023–24	5 January 2024	(Germany) Oberhof	7.5 km Sprint	Biathlon World Cup	1st
20	2023–24	6 January 2024	(Germany) Oberhof	10 km Pursuit	Biathlon World Cup	2nd
21	2023–24	9 February 2024	(Czech Republic) Nové Město	7.5 km Sprint	Biathlon World Championships	2nd
22	2023–24	11 February 2024	(Czech Republic) Nové Město	10 km Pursuit	Biathlon World Championships	3rd
23	2023–24	18 February 2024	(Czech Republic) Nové Město	12.5 km Mass Start	Biathlon World Championships	1st
24	2023–24	8 March 2024	(United States) Soldier Hollow	7.5 km Sprint	Biathlon World Cup	1st
25	2023–24	16 March 2024	(Canada) Canmore	10 km Pursuit	Biathlon World Cup	3rd
26	2024–25	20 December 2024	(France) Annecy-Le Grand-Bornand	7.5 km Sprint	Biathlon World Cup	1st
27	2024–25	14 February 2025	(Switzerland) Lenzerheide	7.5 km Sprint	Biathlon World Championships	1st
28	2024–25	16 February 2025	(Switzerland) Lenzerheide	10 km Pursuit	Biathlon World Championships	3rd
29	2024–25	7 March 2025	(Czech Republic) Nové Město	7.5 km Sprint	Biathlon World Cup	2nd
30	2025–26	21 December 2025	(France) Annecy-Le Grand-Bornand	12.5 km Mass Start	Biathlon World Cup	3rd
31	2025–26	23 January 2026	(Czech Republic) Nové Město	12.5 km Short Individual	Biathlon World Cup	1st

Relay victories

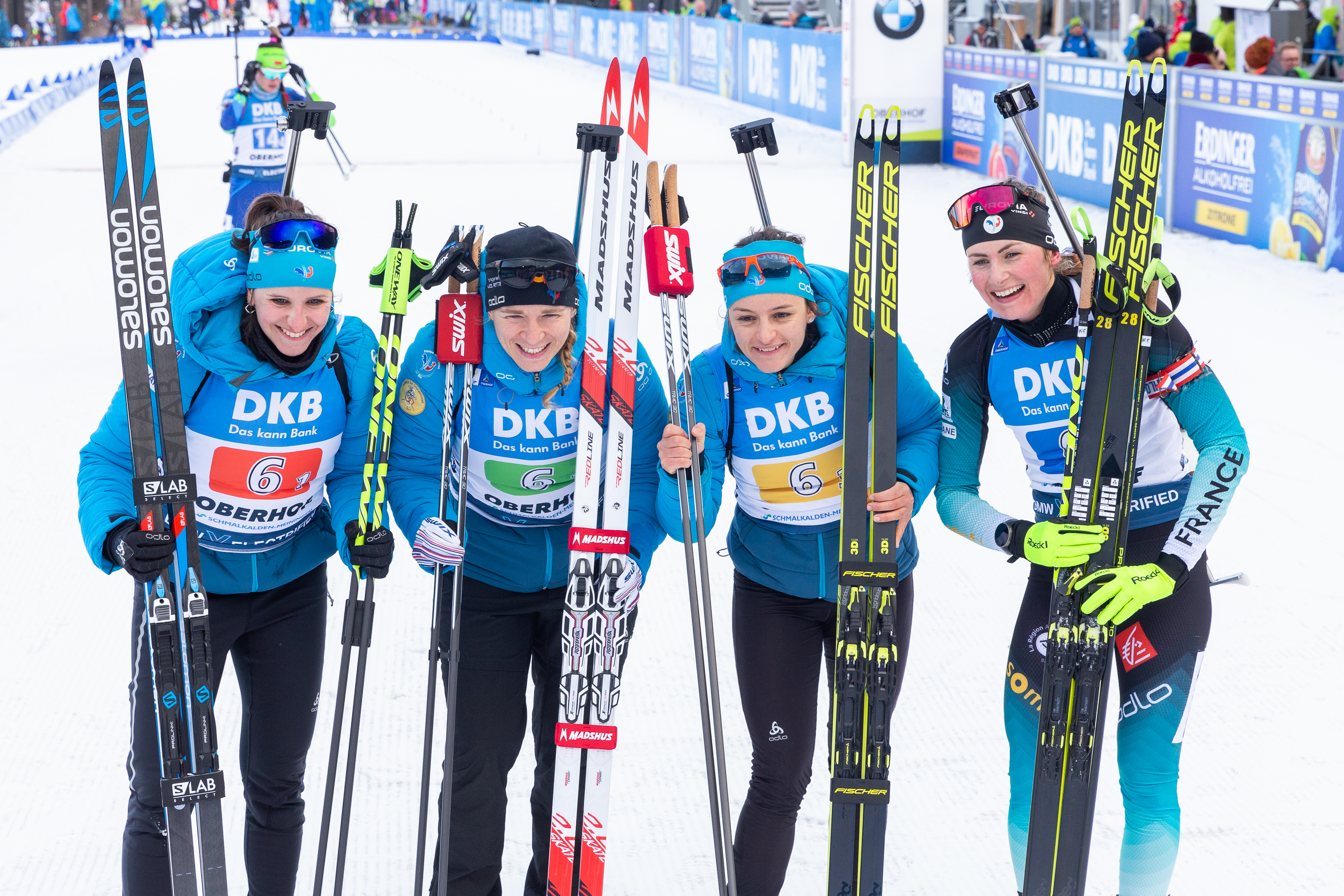
Simon / Bescond / Aymonier / Braisaz finishing 3rd at Oberhof on 11 January 2020

11 victories

No.	Season	Date	Location	Discipline	Level	Team
1	2015–16	24 January 2016	(Italy) Antholz-Anterselva	Relay	Biathlon World Cup	Braisaz / Bescond / Chevalier / Dorin Habert
2	2017–18	7 January 2018	(Germany) Oberhof	Relay	Biathlon World Cup	Bescond / Chevalier / Aymonier / Braisaz
3	2018–19	2 December 2018	(Slovenia) Pokljuka	Mixed Relay	Biathlon World Cup	Bescond / Braisaz / Fourcade / Desthieux
4	2018–19	19 January 2019	(Germany) Ruhpolding	Relay	Biathlon World Cup	Simon / Bescond / Braisaz / Chevalier
5	2019–20	25 January 2020	(Slovenia) Pokljuka	Mixed Relay	Biathlon World Cup	Fillon Maillet / Desthieux / Braisaz / Simon
6	2021–22	5 December 2021	(Sweden) Östersund	Relay	Biathlon World Cup	Bescond / Chevalier / Simon / Braisaz
7	2021–22	14 January 2022	(Germany) Ruhpolding	Relay	Biathlon World Cup	Chevalier / C.Chevalier / Braisaz / Simon
8	2023–24	25 November 2023	(Sweden) Östersund	Mixed Relay	Biathlon World Cup	Fillon Maillet / Jacquelin / Braisaz / Jeanmonnot
9	2023–24	7 January 2024	(Germany) Oberhof	Relay	Biathlon World Cup	Jeanmonnot / Braisaz / Chauveau / Simon
10	2023–24	7 February 2024	(Czech Republic) Nové Město	Mixed Relay	World Championships	Perrot / Fillon Maillet / Braisaz / Simon
11	2023–24	17 February 2024	(Czech Republic) Nové Město	Relay	World Championships	Jeanmonnot / Chauveau / Braisaz / Simon

== Personal life ==
In 2020, Braisaz married her coach and biathlete, Julien Bouchet. She gave birth to their daughter Côme in February 2023 and returned to the Biathlon World Cup in November 2023.
