= Julia Simon (biathlete) =

French biathlete (born 1996)

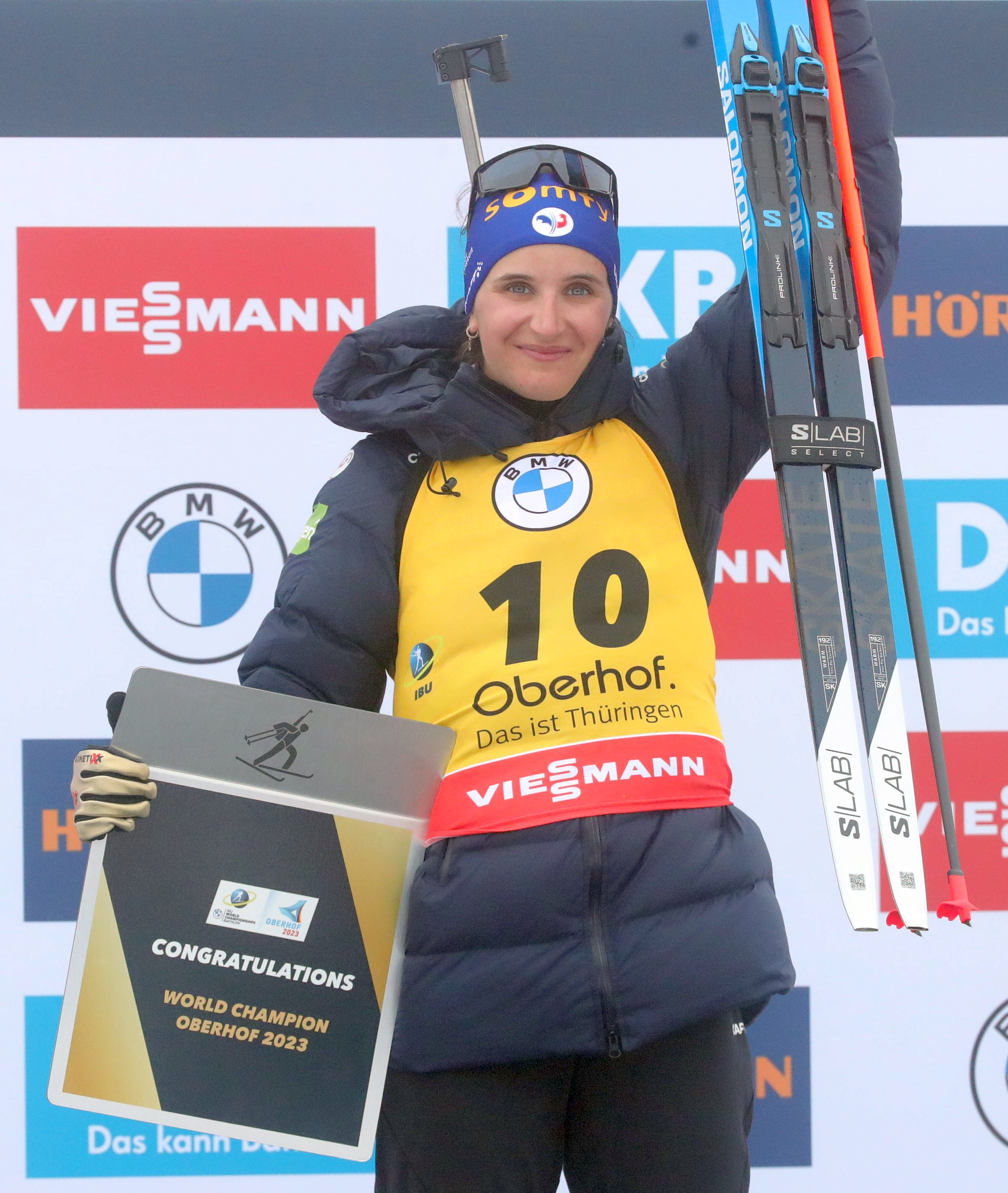
- Simon in 2023

Personal information
- Born: 9 October 1996 (age 29) Albertville, France
- Height: 1.70 m (5 ft 7 in)
- Weight: 62 kg (137 lb)

Sport

Professional information
- Club: Les Saisies

Olympic Games
- Teams: 2 (2022, 2026)
- Medals: 5 (3 gold)

World Championships
- Teams: 6 (2019–2025)
- Medals: 13 (10 gold)

World Cup
- Seasons: 8 (2016/17–)
- Individual victories: 12
- All victories: 26
- Overall titles: 1 (2022–23)
- Discipline titles: 2: 1 Pursuit (2022–23), 1 Mass Start (2022–23)
Medal record
Women's biathlon
Representing France
Event	1st	2nd	3rd
Olympic Games	3	2	0
World Championships	10	0	3
Total	13	2	3
Olympic Games
Gold medal – first place	2026 Milano Cortina	15 km individual
Gold medal – first place	2026 Milano Cortina	4 × 6 km relay
Gold medal – first place	2026 Milano Cortina	Mixed relay
Silver medal – second place	2022 Beijing	Mixed relay
Silver medal – second place	2026 Milano Cortina	12.5 km mass start
World Championships
Gold medal – first place	2021 Pokljuka	Single mixed relay
Gold medal – first place	2023 Oberhof	10 km pursuit
Gold medal – first place	2024 Nové Město	7.5 km sprint
Gold medal – first place	2024 Nové Město	10 km pursuit
Gold medal – first place	2024 Nové Město	4 × 6 km relay
Gold medal – first place	2024 Nové Město	Mixed relay
Gold medal – first place	2025 Lenzerheide	15 km individual
Gold medal – first place	2025 Lenzerheide	4 × 6 km relay
Gold medal – first place	2025 Lenzerheide	Mixed relay
Gold medal – first place	2025 Lenzerheide	Single mixed relay
Bronze medal – third place	2023 Oberhof	12.5 km mass start
Bronze medal – third place	2023 Oberhof	Mixed relay
Bronze medal – third place	2024 Nové Město	15 km individual
European Championships
Silver medal – second place	2018 Ridnaun	Single mixed relay
Bronze medal – third place	2015 Otepää	4 × 6 km relay
Bronze medal – third place	2018 Ridnaun	10 km pursuit
Junior World Championships
Gold medal – first place	2015 Minsk	3 × 6 km relay
Youth World Championships
Gold medal – first place	2014 Presque Isle	3 × 6 km relay
Bronze medal – third place	2014 Presque Isle	6 km sprint

Julia Simon (French pronunciation: [ʒylja simɔ̃]; born 9 October 1996) is a French biathlete. She competes in the Biathlon World Cup.

== Biathlon results ==
All results are sourced from the International Biathlon Union.

=== Olympic Games ===
She has won five medals; three golds and two silvers.

Event	Individual	Sprint	Pursuit	Mass start	Relay	Mixed relay
(South Korea) 2018 Pyeongchang	(did not race / selected as an alternate)					
(China) 2022 Beijing	21st	29th	8th	6th	6th	Silver
(Italy) 2026 Milano Cortina	Gold	34th	DNS	Silver	Gold	Gold

=== World Championships ===
She has won 13 medals; 10 golds and three bronzes.

Event	Individual	Sprint	Pursuit	Mass start	Relay	Mixed relay	Single mixed relay
(Sweden) 2019 Östersund	24th	61st	—	—	8th	8th	7th
(Italy) 2020 Antholz-Anterselva	31st	41st	35th	5th	14th	7th	—
(Slovenia) 2021 Pokljuka	DNF	28th	22nd	16th	8th	5th	Gold
(Germany) 2023 Oberhof	5th	10th	Gold	Bronze	4th	Bronze	—
(Czech Republic) 2024 Nové Město	Bronze	Gold	Gold	4th	Gold	Gold	—
(Switzerland) 2025 Lenzerheide	Gold	7th	12th	22nd	Gold	Gold	Gold

=== World Cup ===
World Cup rankings

Season	Overall		Individual		Sprint		Pursuit		Mass start	
Season	Points	Position	Points	Position	Points	Position	Points	Position	Points	Position
2016–17	29	76th	0	—	16	69th	13	73rd	0	—
2017–18	42	67th	0	—	29	60th	13	66th	0	—
2018–19	415	23rd	47	23rd	168	17th	115	25th	85	24th
2019–20	551	8th	74	13th	211	9th	144	8th	128	12th
2020–21	575	13th	19	44th	140	19th	192	10th	181	3rd
2021–22	554	12th	54	8th	194	15th	192	7th	114	8th
2022–23	1093	1st	155	2nd	295	3rd	373	1st	270	1st
2023–24	994	5th	110	5th	259	6th	384	2nd	241	2nd
2024–25	902	3rd	120	5th	259	5th	343	2nd	180	6th
2025–26	827	6th	68	16th	275	6th	239	9th	245	1st

Individual victories

17 victories (1 In, 3 Sp, 7 Pu, 6 MS)

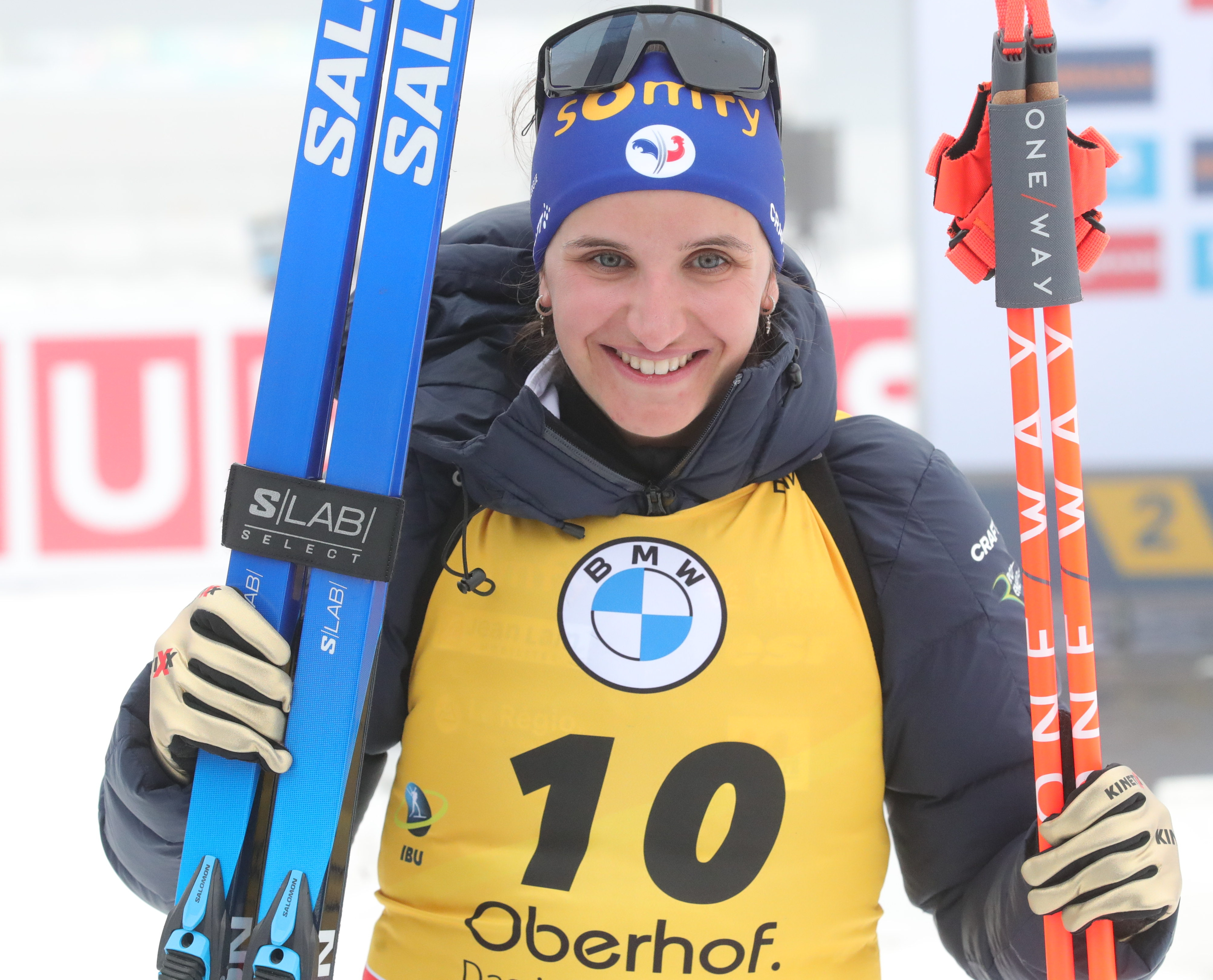
Simon winning the Pursuit at the World Championships at Oberhof on 12 February 2023

No.	Season	Date	Location	Discipline	Level
1	2019–20	14 March 2020	(Finland) Kontiolahti	10 km Pursuit	Biathlon World Cup
2	2020–21	17 January 2021	(Germany) Oberhof	12.5 km Mass Start	Biathlon World Cup
3	2020–21	23 January 2021	(Italy) Antholz-Anterselva	12.5 km Mass Start	Biathlon World Cup
4	2021–22	11 March 2022	(Estonia) Otepää	7.5 km Sprint	Biathlon World Cup
5	2022–23	4 December 2022	(Finland) Kontiolahti	10 km Pursuit	Biathlon World Cup
6	2022–23	10 December 2022	(Austria) Hochfilzen	10 km Pursuit	Biathlon World Cup
7	2022–23	15 January 2023	(Germany) Ruhpolding	12.5 km Mass Start	Biathlon World Cup
8	2022–23	12 February 2023	(Germany) Oberhof	10 km Pursuit	Biathlon World Championships
9	2023–24	6 January 2024	(Germany) Oberhof	10 km Pursuit	Biathlon World Cup
10	2023–24	21 January 2024	(Italy) Antholz-Anterselva	12.5 km Mass Start	Biathlon World Cup
11	2023–24	9 February 2024	(Czech Republic) Nové Město	7.5 km Sprint	Biathlon World Championships
12	2023–24	11 February 2024	(Czech Republic) Nové Město	10 km Pursuit	Biathlon World Championships
13	2024–25	8 March 2025	(Czech Republic) Nové Město	10 km Pursuit	Biathlon World Cup
14	2024–25	13 March 2025	(Czech Republic) Nové Město	12.5 km Short Individual	Biathlon World Cup
15	2025–26	25 Januar 2026	(Czech Republic) Nové Město	12.5 km Mass Start	Biathlon World Cup
16	2025–26	7 March 2026	(Finland) Kontiolahti	12.5 km Mass Start	Biathlon World Cup
17	2025–26	13 March 2026	(Estonia) Otepää	7.5 km Sprint	Biathlon World Cup

Relay victories

16 victories

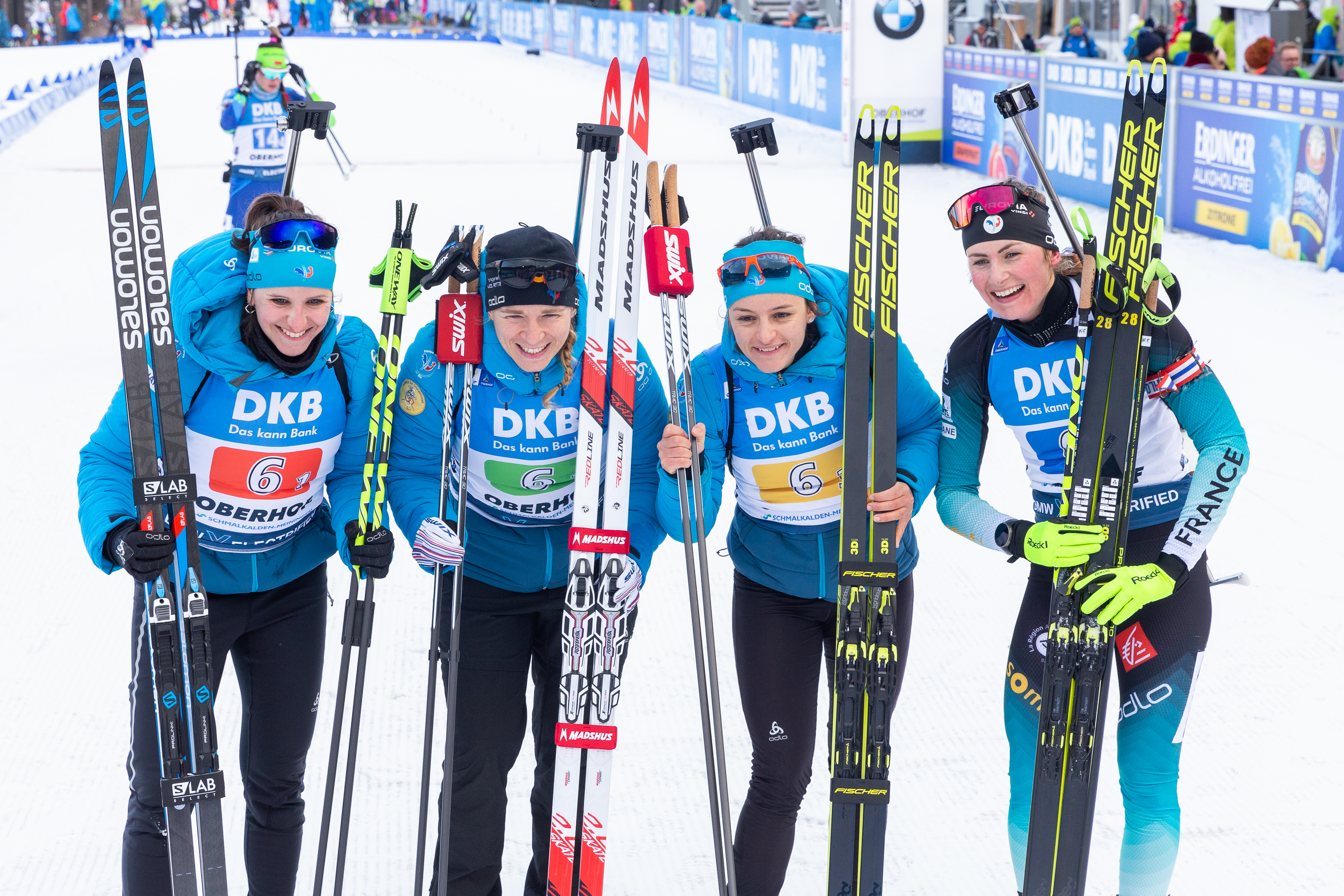
Simon / Bescond / Aymonier / Braisaz finishing 3rd at Oberhof on 11 January 2020

No.	Season	Date	Location	Discipline	Level	Team
1	2018–19	19 January 2019	(Germany) Ruhpolding	Relay	Biathlon World Cup	Simon / Bescond / Braisaz / Chevalier
2	2019–20	25 January 2020	(Slovenia) Pokljuka	Mixed Relay	Biathlon World Cup	Fillon Maillet / Desthieux / Braisaz / Simon
3	2020–21	10 January 2021	(Germany) Oberhof	Single Mixed Relay	Biathlon World Cup	Simon / Jacquelin
4	2020–21	18 February 2021	(Slovenia) Pokljuka	Single Mixed Relay	World Championships	Guigonnat / Simon
5	2021–22	5 December 2021	(Sweden) Östersund	Relay	Biathlon World Cup	Bescond / Chevalier / Simon / Braisaz
6	2021–22	14 January 2022	(Germany) Ruhpolding	Relay	Biathlon World Cup	Chevalier / C.Chevalier / Braisaz / Simon
7	2022–23	11 December 2022	(Austria) Hochfilzen	Relay	Biathlon World Cup	Jeanmonnot / Chevalier / C.Chevalier / Simon
8	2022–23	8 January 2023	(Slovenia) Pokljuka	Mixed Relay	Biathlon World Cup	Claude / Fillon Maillet / Chevalier / Simon
9	2022–23	22 January 2023	(Italy) Antholz-Anterselva	Relay	Biathlon World Cup	Jeanmonnot / Chevalier / C.Chevalier / Simon
10	2023–24	7 January 2024	(Germany) Oberhof	Relay	Biathlon World Cup	Jeanmonnot / Braisaz / Chauveau / Simon
11	2023–24	10 January 2024	(Germany) Ruhpolding	Relay	Biathlon World Cup	Jeanmonnot / Richard / Chauveau / Simon
12	2023–24	7 February 2024	(Czech Republic) Nové Město	Mixed Relay	World Championships	Perrot / Fillon Maillet / Braisaz / Simon
13	2023–24	17 February 2024	(Czech Republic) Nové Město	Relay	World Championships	Jeanmonnot / Chauveau / Braisaz / Simon
14	2023–24	3 March 2024	(Norway) Oslo Holmenkollen	Mixed Relay	Biathlon World Cup	Simon / Chauveau / Claude / Fillon Maillet
15	2024–25	9 March 2025	(Czech Republic) Nové Město	Relay	Biathlon World Cup	Jeanmonnot / Michelon / Braisaz / Simon
16	2025–26	10 Januar 2026	(Germany) Oberhof	Relay	Biathlon World Cup	Jeanmonnot / Michelon / Braisaz / Simon

*Results are from IBU races which include the Biathlon World Cup, Biathlon World Championships and the Winter Olympic Games.

== Personal life ==
On 25 October 2025, Simon was sentenced to 3 months suspended jail term and a fine of €15 000 for stealing from teammate Justine Braisaz-Bouchet's credit card. At first she denied the allegation, claiming that she was a victim of identity theft, but she later admitted her guilt.

The French Skiing Federations disciplinary committee reviewed Simon's case and decided to sanction her. She received a six-month ban (five months suspended) and a €30,000 fine (€15,000 suspended). Due to this sanction she could not compete in the 2025–26 Biathlon World Cup – Stage 1 in Östersund, Sweden.
