= Natalia Sidorowicz =

Polish biathlete (born 1998)

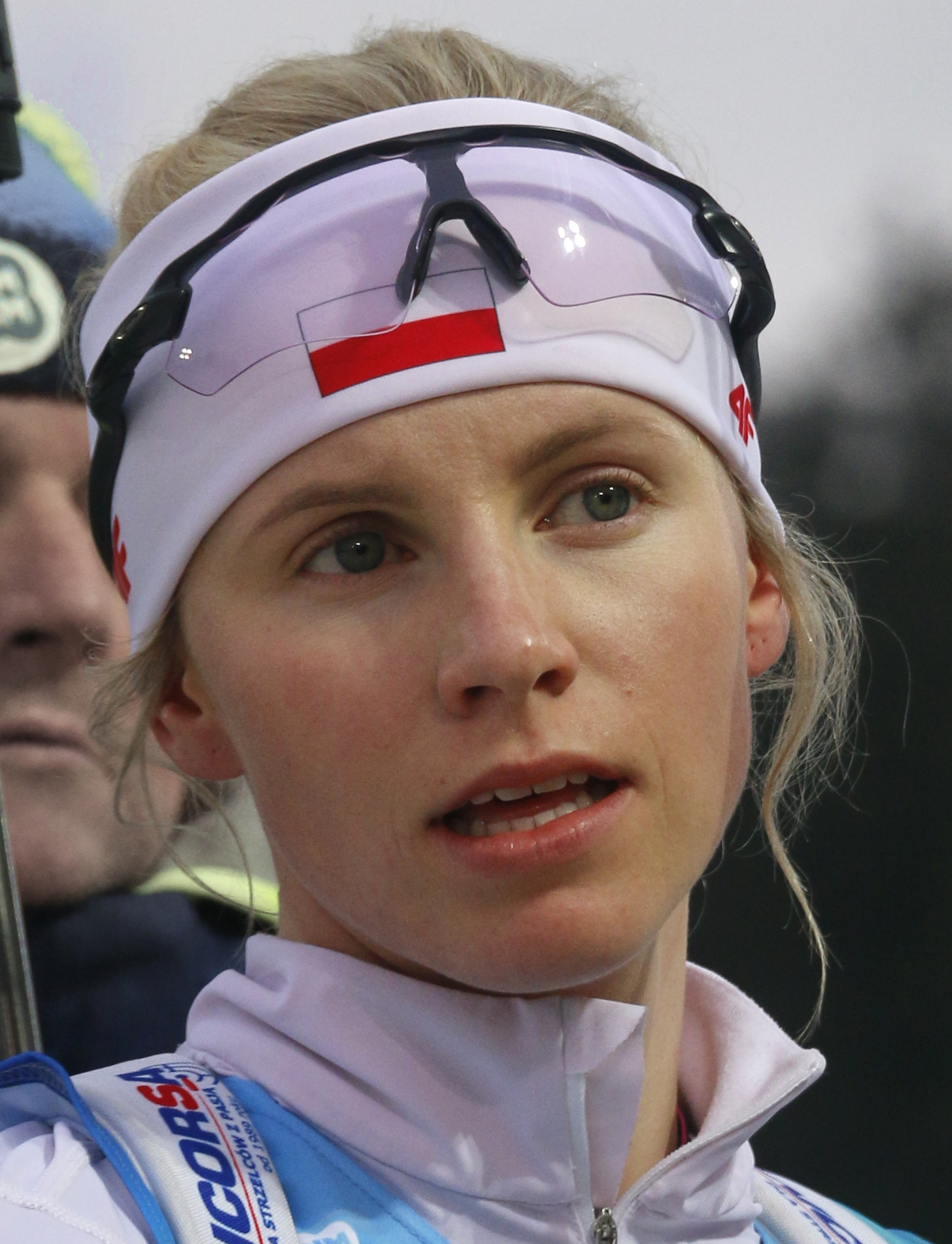
- Sidorowicz in 2023

Personal information
- Born: 9 September 1998 (age 27) Zakopane, Poland

Sport
- Country: Poland
- Sport: Biathlon

Natalia Sidorowicz (née Tomaszewska; born 9 September 1998) is a Polish biathlete. She has competed in the Biathlon World Cup since 2022.

== Career ==
Natalia Sidorowicz made her international debut at the 2016 Youth Olympic Games in Lillehammer, finishing 46th and 41st in the sprint and pursuit races. In the 2016/17 season, she competed in the junior category but did not achieve notable results. The following year, Sidorowicz won her first individual medal, securing bronze in the mixed relay at the 2018 IBU Junior Open European Championships with Joanna Jakieła, Przemysław Pancerz, and Marcin Szwajnos. At the subsequent Junior World Championships, she improved on her previous year's performance, with her best individual result being 12th place in the sprint.

In early 2019, Sidorowicz made her debut in the IBU Cup at her home races in Duszniki-Zdrój, followed by her first podium finish in the IBU Junior Cup. After a season marked by average results, the Polish athlete permanently joined the IBU Cup in the 2020/21 season, achieving a 17th place in the short individual race in Osrblie. She also participated in the 2021 IBU Open European Championships held in her home country.

In January 2022, Sidorowicz made her World Cup debut in Ruhpolding, finishing 94th in the sprint. With the women's relay team consisting of Monika Hojnisz-Staręga, Kamila Żuk, and Anna Mąka, she secured a 10th place. At the European Championships, she excelled in the pursuit competition under extreme conditions, being the only athlete to hit 18 out of 20 targets and improving her position by 33 places to finish eighth. In the winter of 2022/23, Sidorowicz consistently competed at the highest level, narrowly missing her first World Cup points by finishing 42nd in the sprint race in Le Grand-Bornand. She also participated in the World Championships, where the Polish women's relay team finished ninth. In August 2023, she narrowly missed her first senior-level medal, finishing fourth in the sprint event at the Summer Biathlon World Championships. At the Biathlon World Championships 2024, she secured the 14th place in the pursuit race, marking her career-best performance.

== Biathlon results ==
All results are sourced from the International Biathlon Union.

=== Olympic Games ===
0 medal

Event	Individual	Sprint	Pursuit	Mass start	Relay	Mixed relay
(Italy) 2026 Milano Cortina	23rd	41st	13th	15th	6th	9th

=== World Championships ===
Event	Individual	Sprint	Pursuit	Mass start	Relay	Mixed relay	Single mixed relay
(Germany) 2023 Oberhof	56th	74th	—	—	9th	—	—
(Czech Republic) 2024 Nové Mesto	47th	16th	14th	16th	6th	—	13th
(Switzerland) 2025 Lenzerheide	26th	13th	55th	23rd	9th	14th	—

=== World Cup ===
Season	Overall			Individual		Sprint		Pursuit		Mass start	
Season	Races	Points	Position	Points	Position	Points	Position	Points	Position	Points	Position
2021–22	2/22	Didn't earn World Cup points									
2022–23	11/20	Didn't earn World Cup points									
2023–24	16/21	71	50th	19	47th	17	62nd	31	46th	4	43rd

=== Youth and Junior World Championships ===
0 medals

Year	Age	Individual	Sprint	Pursuit	Relay
(Slovakia) 2017 Brezno-Osrblie	18	28th	69th	—	15th
(Estonia) 2018 Otepaeae	19	25th	12th	19th	5th
(Slovakia) 2019 Brezno-Osrblie	20	66th	45th	44th	10th
(Switzerland) 2020 Lenzerheide	21	32nd	51st	44th	6th
