= Joanna Jakieła =

Polish biathlete (born 1999)

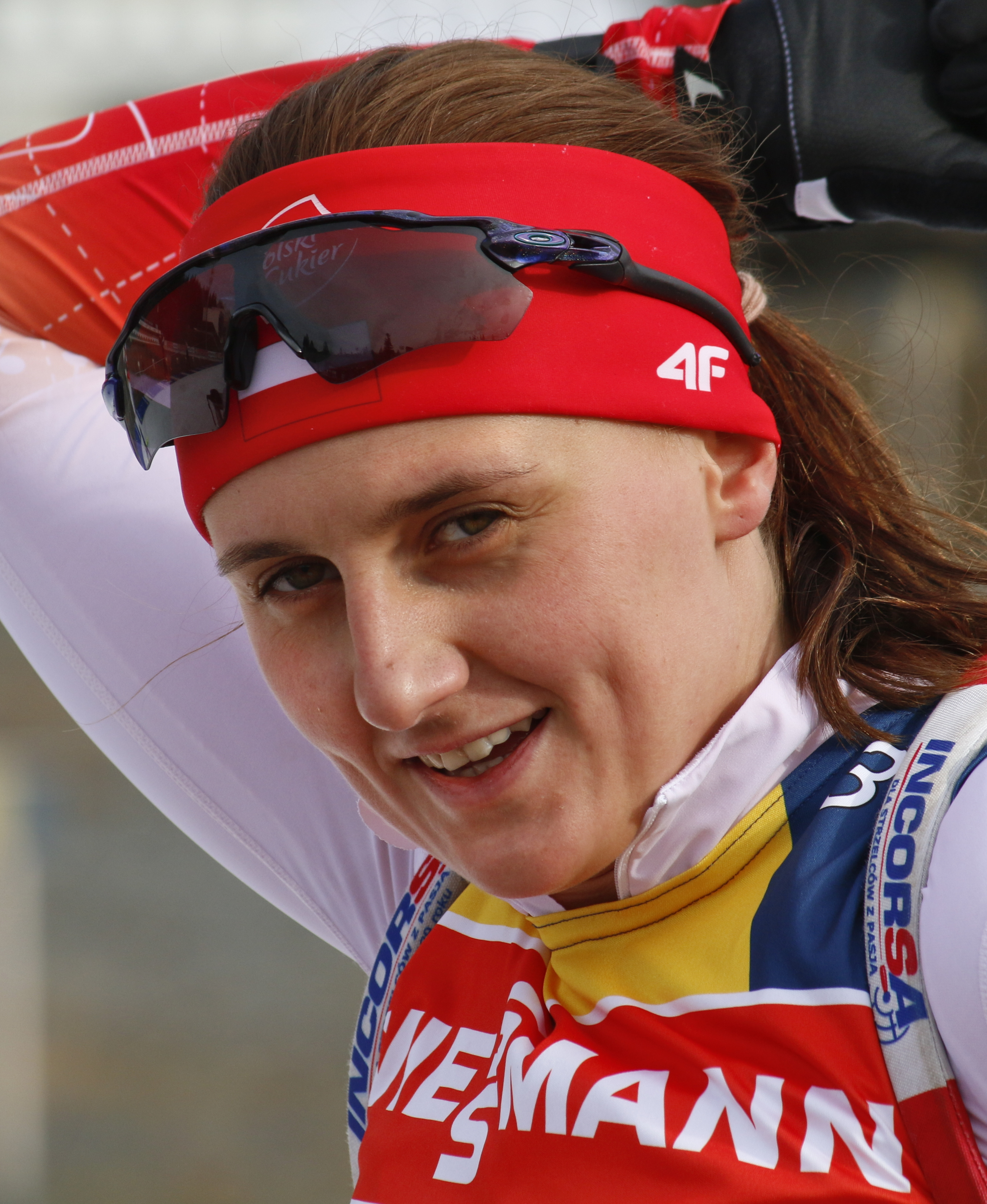
- Jakieła in 2024

Personal information
- Nationality: Polish
- Born: 2 March 1999 (age 27) Zakopane, Poland

Sport
- Country: Poland
- Sport: Biathlon

Joanna Jakieła (born 3 March 1999) is a Polish biathlete who has competed in the Biathlon World Cup since 2020. She participated in the 2026 Olympic Games.

Her best result is 6th place in the sprint at the World Cup stage in Östersund in the 2025/26 season.

== Biathlon results ==
All results are sourced from the International Biathlon Union.

=== Olympic Games ===
0 medals

Event	Individual	Sprint	Pursuit	Mass start	Relay	Mixed relay
(Italy) 2026 Milano Cortina	66th	28th	16th	11th	6th	—

=== World Championships ===
0 medals

Event	Individual	Sprint	Pursuit	Mass start	Relay	Mixed relay	Single mixed relay
(Italy) 2020 Antholz-Anterselva	92nd	—	—	—	—	—	—
(Slovenia) 2021 Pokljuka	—	66th	—	—	—	—	—
(Germany) 2023 Oberhof	71st	51st	50th	—	9th	22nd	—
(Czech Republic) 2024 Nove Mesto	40th	23nd	17th	25th	6th	15th	—
(Switzerland) 2025 Lenzerheide	55th	27th	26th	—	9th	—	17th
