= Wood anemone =

The phrase wood anemone is used in common names for several closely related species of flowering plants in genus Anemonoides, including:

- Anemonoides nemorosa, the wood anemone in Europe and Asia
- Anemonoides quinquefolia, the wood anemone in North America
- Anemonoides oregana, the western wood anemone in North America
- Anemonoides ranunculoides, the yellow wood anemone in Europe and Asia
