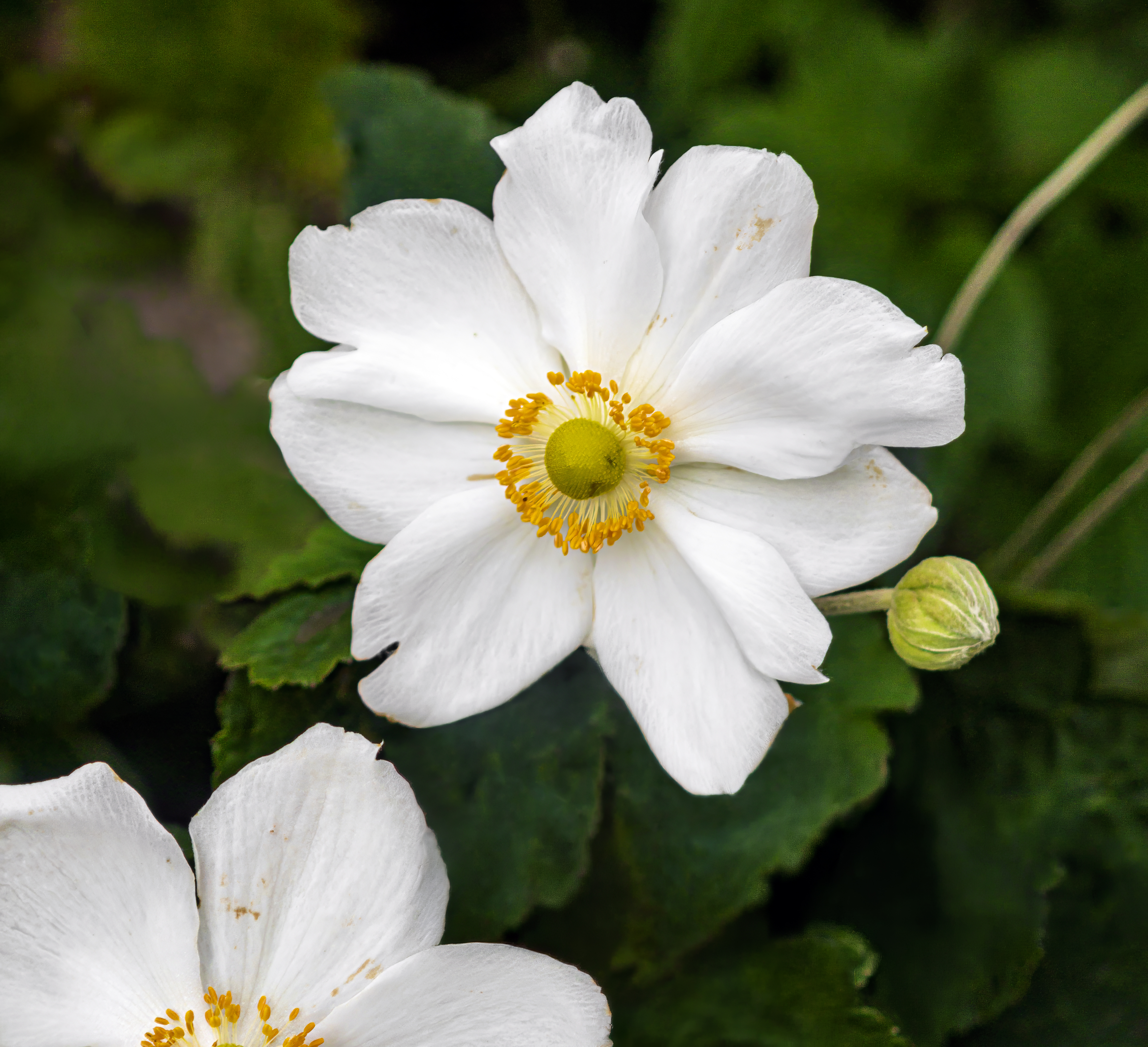
- In flower

Scientific classification
- Kingdom: Plantae
- Clade: Tracheophytes
- Clade: Angiosperms
- Clade: Eudicots
- Order: Ranunculales
- Family: Ranunculaceae
- Genus: Anemonoides
- Species: A. sylvestris

Binomial name
- Anemonoides sylvestris (L.) Galasso, Banfi & Soldano

= Anemonoides sylvestris =

Species of flowering plant in the buttercup family

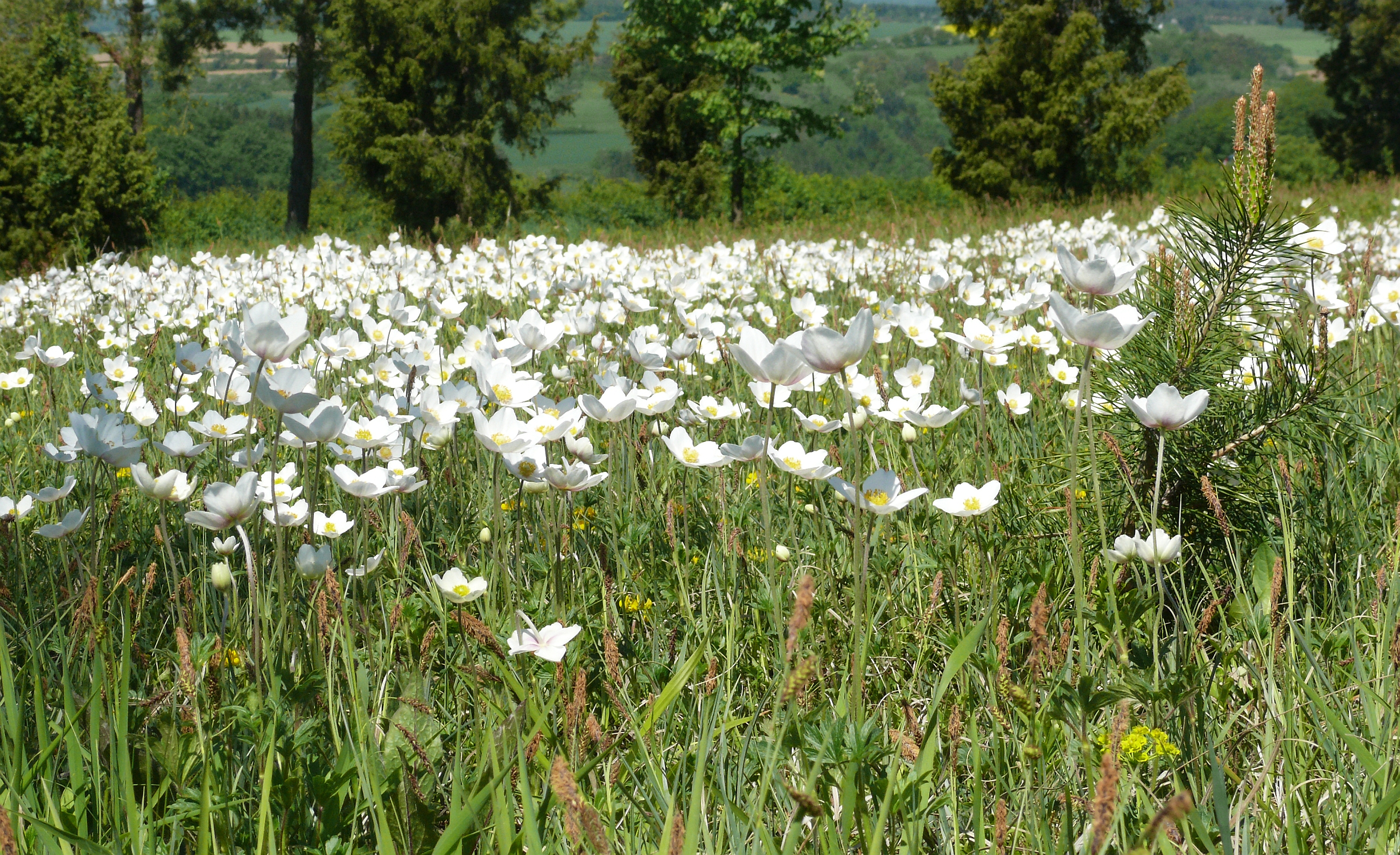
A dense stand of snowdrop anemones

Anemonoides sylvestris (syn. Anemone sylvestris), known as snowdrop anemone or snowdrop windflower, is a perennial plant flowering in spring, native to meadows and dry deciduous woodlands of central and western Europe and temperate Asia. It forms spreading patches, sometimes aggressively spreading.

Another name is wood anemone, but this more commonly refers to the European A. nemorosa or the North American A. quinquefolia.

== Description ==
The species grows 1–1.5 feet (0.30–0.46 m) tall with white flowers which bloom in April. Flowers have five petals with yellow anthers in the center and are fragrant.

== Cultivation ==
Cultivars include Anemonoides sylvestris 'Madonna'.

== Habitat and distribution ==
Anemonoides sylvestris is widespread in Central Europe, primarily in the colline to submontane zones, and increasingly in the lowlands further east. Its wide distribution ranges from France and Central Europe across the Balkans and Asia Minor to the Caucasus. From Eastern Europe, the species extends through southern Siberia to Mongolia and northern China.

It thrives in moist, well-drained soil rich in organic matter and prefers partial shade, though it can tolerate full sun in cooler climates. Starting from sunny woodland edges, the species also spreads into adjacent grasslands where it colonizes dry, nitrogen-poor and deep soils in sunny to lightly shaded locations.

=== Special protection status ===
Due to the decline of its natural habitat, this species is considered endangered and it is actively protected in several nations, such as Bulgaria, France, Germany, Poland and Switzerland.
