= Blue anemone =

Blue anemone is a common name for closely related species of plants:

- In Europe: Anemonoides apennina
- In North America: Anemonoides oregana
- In Mediterranean Basin: Anemone coronaria
