= Pokljuka =

Forested karst plateau in Slovenia

Coordinates: 46°21′37″N 14°01′48″E

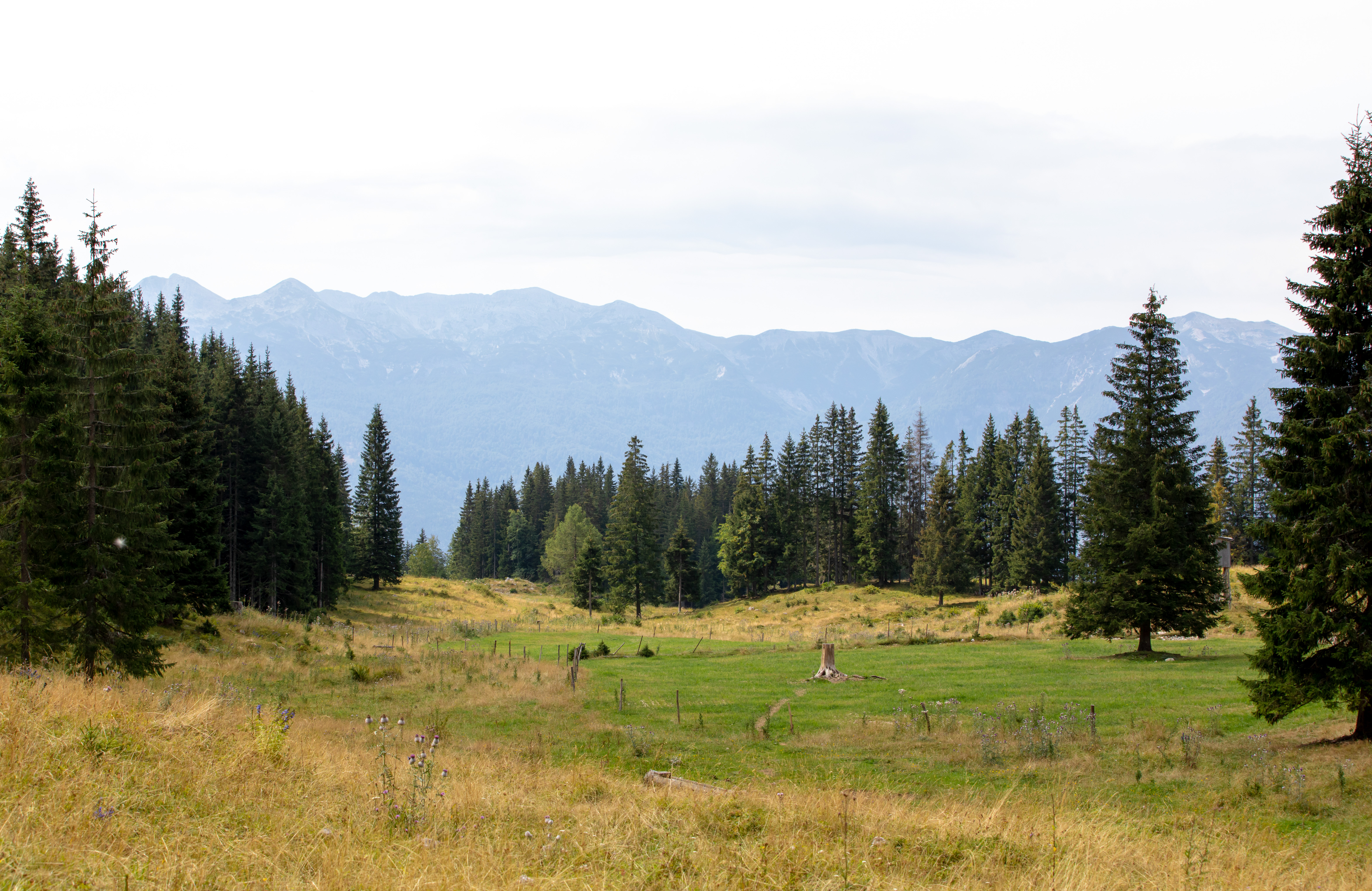
- Mountain pastures at Pokljuka plateau

Highest point
- Peak: Debela peč (2014 m)
- Elevation: 1,100–1,400 m (3,600–4,600 ft)

Dimensions
- Length: 20 km (12 mi)
- Area: 6,300 ha (16,000 acres)

Geography
- Location within Slovenia
- Country: Slovenia
- Settlement(s): Zatrnik, Gorjuše, Koprivnik v Bohinju, Podjelje
- Parent range: Julian Alps

Geology
- Rock age: trias
- Mountain type: karst plateau

The Pokljuka Plateau (pronounced [pɔˈkljuːka]) is a forested karst plateau at an elevation of around 1,100 to 1,400 metres (3,600 to 4,600 ft), located in the Julian Alps in northwestern Slovenia.

The plateau is known for its forests, mountain pastures (Javornik, Lipanca, Uskovnica, Zajamniki, etc.), and winter sports facilities. It is also a common starting point for mountain hikers. The yearly Biathlon World Cup meets are held at the Pokljuka Biathlon Center, 15 kilometres (9.3 mi) west of the town of Bled (25 kilometres or 16 miles by car). Pokljuka is part of Triglav National Park. Administratively, it belongs to the municipalities of Bled, Bohinj, and Gorje.

Many beech and fir trees were chopped down in the 18th century for the iron foundries in Bohinj. They have been naturally replaced mostly by spruce trees. Some swamps can also be found, which is not usual on such high plateaus.

== Geography and geology ==
Pokljuka is built of thick Upper Triassic limestone and dolomite that have been deeply dissolved by groundwater to produce a classic high-karst landscape dotted with sinkholes, enclosed depressions and small blind valleys. The rock is locally shot through with chert lenses; where these weather out they leave pockets of acidic, sandy brown earth amid otherwise lime-rich, shallow rendzinas (thin, stony soils formed directly on limestone). During the Last Glacial Maximum a tongue of the Bohinj glacier over-rode the plateau; the meltwater that drained along tectonic fractures later carved the 50-metre-deep Pokljuka Gorge, leaving behind a fossil canyon, natural bridges and a well-known cave system. Annual precipitation reaches 1,500–2,000 mm and the mean air temperature hovers between 3 °C and 6 °C, giving the area a cool, moist sub-alpine climate with frequent temperature inversions in the hollows.

== Flora, vegetation and conservation ==
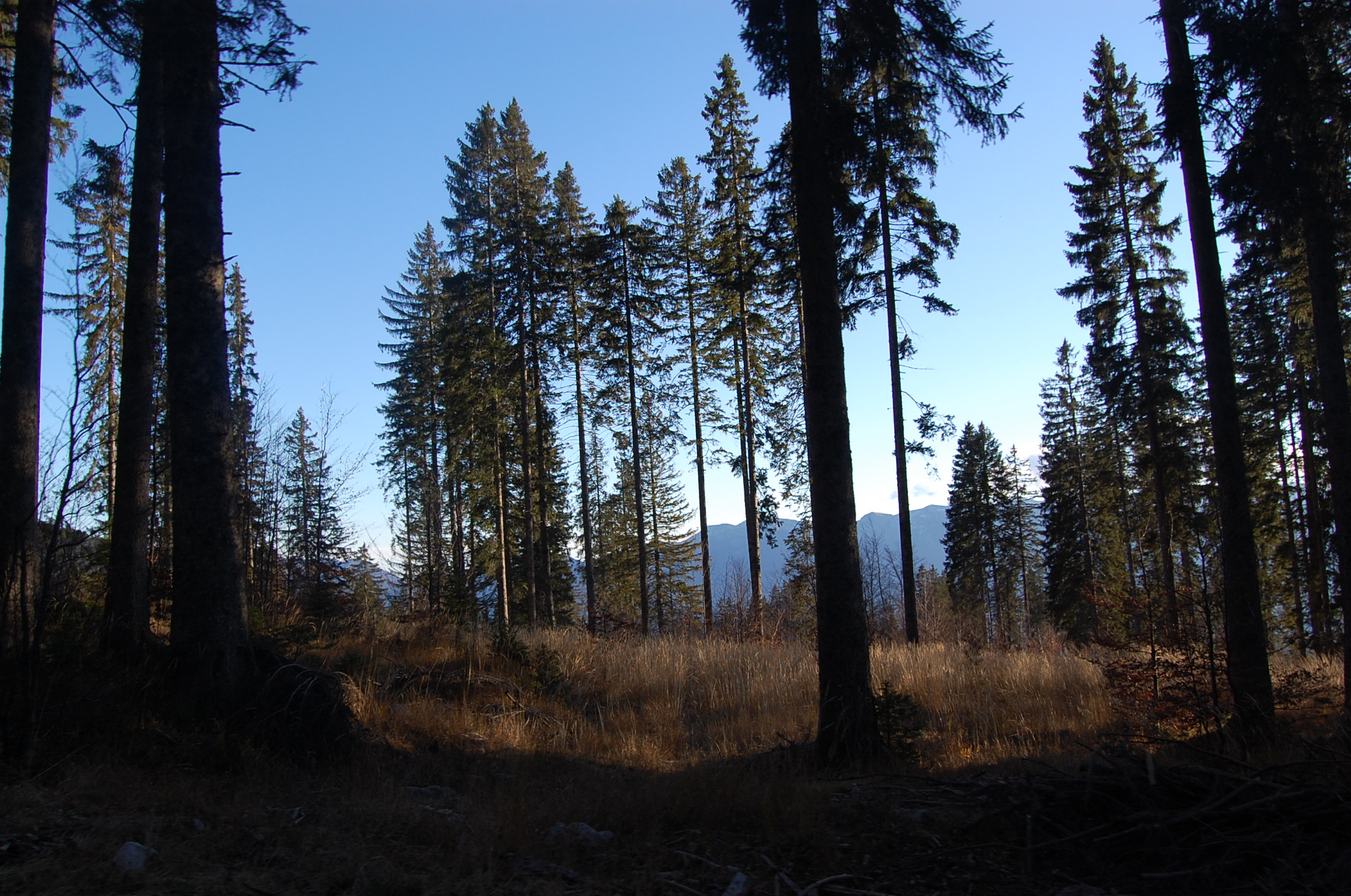
Pokljuka Plateau Forest

Although commercial charcoal-burning removed much of the original beech during the nineteenth century, the plateau is now Slovenia's largest unbroken forest block, dominated by Norway spruce with scattered fir, beech and larch. Detailed floristic work in Pokljuka Gorge records 262 species of vascular plants belonging to 61 families; Central-European elements predominate, but south-east European–Illyrian taxa such as Anemone trifolia and Helleborus niger appear alongside true alpine species brought downslope by cold-air drainage. Fourteen species are legally protected, and the gorge is home to the sub-endemic Burser's saxifrage (Saxifraga burseriana), which forms dense cushions on the limestone cliffs.

Vegetation studies distinguish five forest types and one warm-slope scrub community on the plateau's flanks. The most widespread is the pre-Alpine beech wood with black hellebore (Anemono trifoliae-Fagetum), while colder pockets support spruce–moss forests rich in Rhytidiadelphus loreus and Bazzania trilobata. Sycamore-maple stands fill permanently cool sinkholes known locally as "garden plots", and hop-hornbeam with manna ash clings to sunny cliffs above the gorge. These communities, together with the Šijec raised bog near Goreljek, are part of the Triglav National Park core or buffer zones and are monitored for ecological change.

== Human use and recreation ==
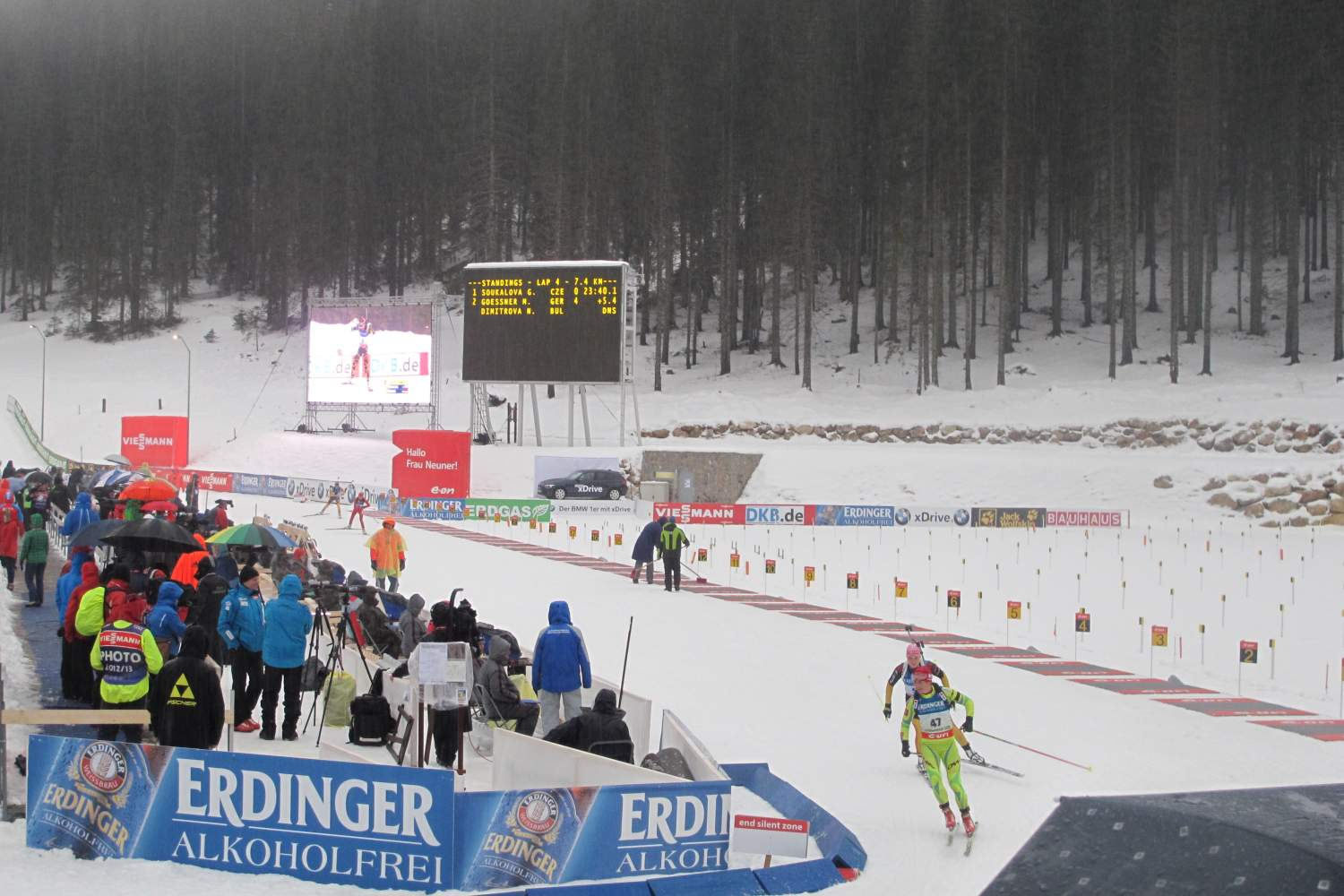
Biathlon World Cup in Pokljuka

Seasonal mountain pastures such as Uskovnica, Zajamniki and Lipanca still break the forest canopy, preserving traditional alpine hay-meadows dotted with wooden shepherds' huts. Today Pokljuka is better known for outdoor sport: the Rudno Polje sports centre hosts regular International Biathlon Union World-Cup and world-championship events on an extensive network of cross-country ski trails. In summer, the same trails double as popular hiking and mountain-bike routes, while the plateau's relatively level terrain offers one of the gentlest approaches to Mount Triglav. The entire area is subject to Triglav National Park regulations, which limit new building and require low-impact forestry in order to maintain the plateau's hydrology, forest structure and botanical biodiversity.
