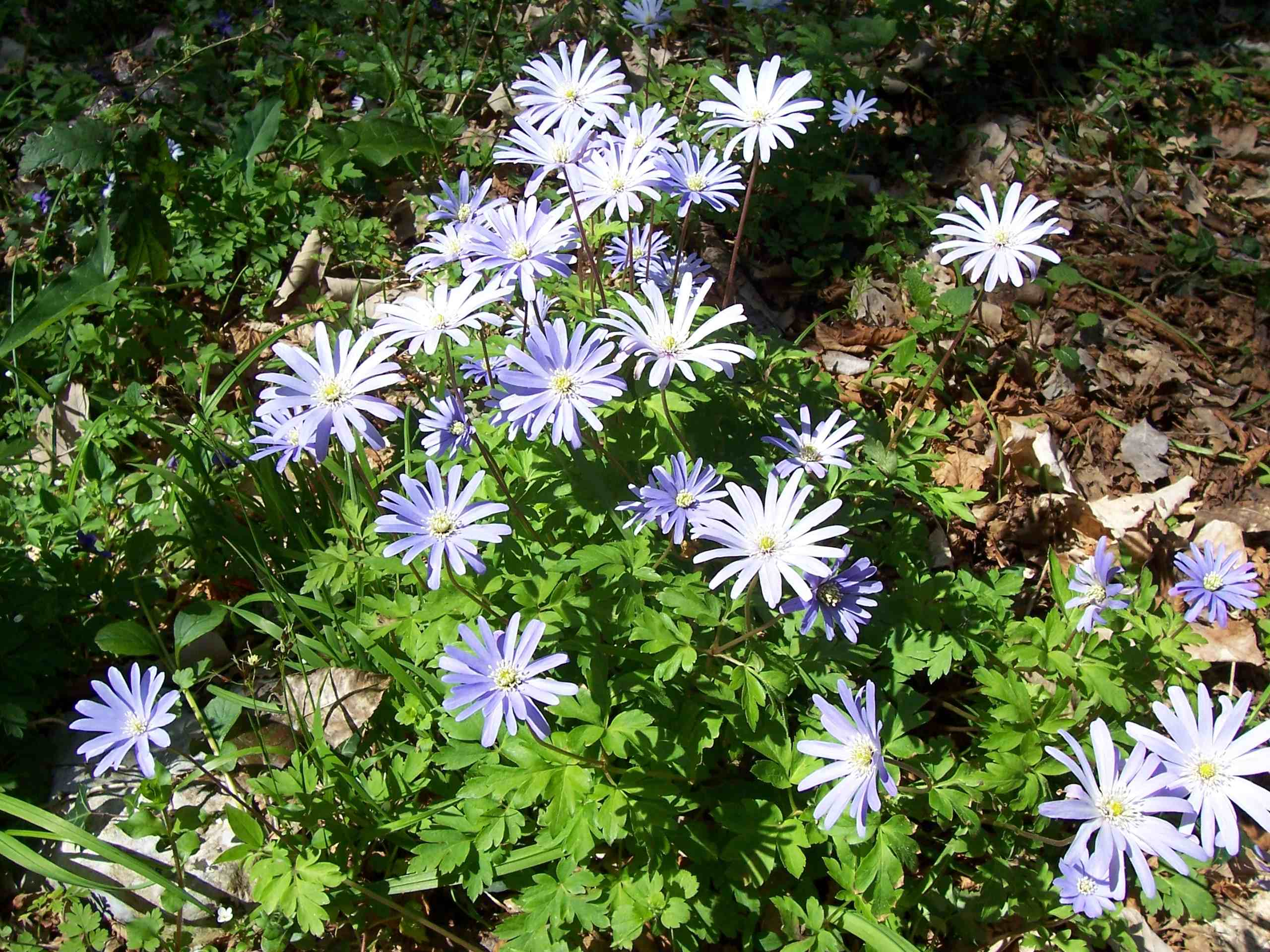

Scientific classification
- Kingdom: Plantae
- Clade: Embryophytes
- Clade: Tracheophytes
- Clade: Spermatophytes
- Clade: Angiosperms
- Clade: Eudicots
- Order: Ranunculales
- Family: Ranunculaceae
- Genus: Anemonoides
- Species: A. apennina

Binomial name
- Anemonoides apennina (L.) Holub

Synonyms
- Anemonanthea apennina (L.) Gray; Anemone apennina Lange; Anemone coerulea Lam; Anemone coerulescens Lange; Anemone pygmaea H.Vilm.; Anemone pyrenaica Pall. ex Pritz.

= Anemonoides apennina =

Species of flowering plant in the buttercup family

Anemonoides apennina (syn. Anemone apennina), the Apennine anemone or blue anemone, is a flowering plant in the family Ranunculaceae. It is a rhizomatous perennial plant, native to southern central Europe, taking its name from the Apennine Mountains, but widely naturalised elsewhere in Europe, including the United Kingdom. It can be confused with Anemonoides nemorosa which it resembles. It grows to 20 cm (7.9 in). In early spring it produces single blue flowers above ferny foliage, which dies down in summer. The flowers are about 3.5 cm across, with 10–15 narrow petals. The leaves are palmate with dark green 3-lobed, toothed leaflets. The leaves are hairy underneath, which is how this plant may be distinguished from the similar Anemone blanda. It is especially valued for its ability to colonise deciduous woodlands, but it is also found in open scrub, under park trees, and near former habitation. This plant has gained the Royal Horticultural Society's Award of Garden Merit.

Eating A. apennina may cause mild stomach upset, and contact with the skin may cause irritation.
