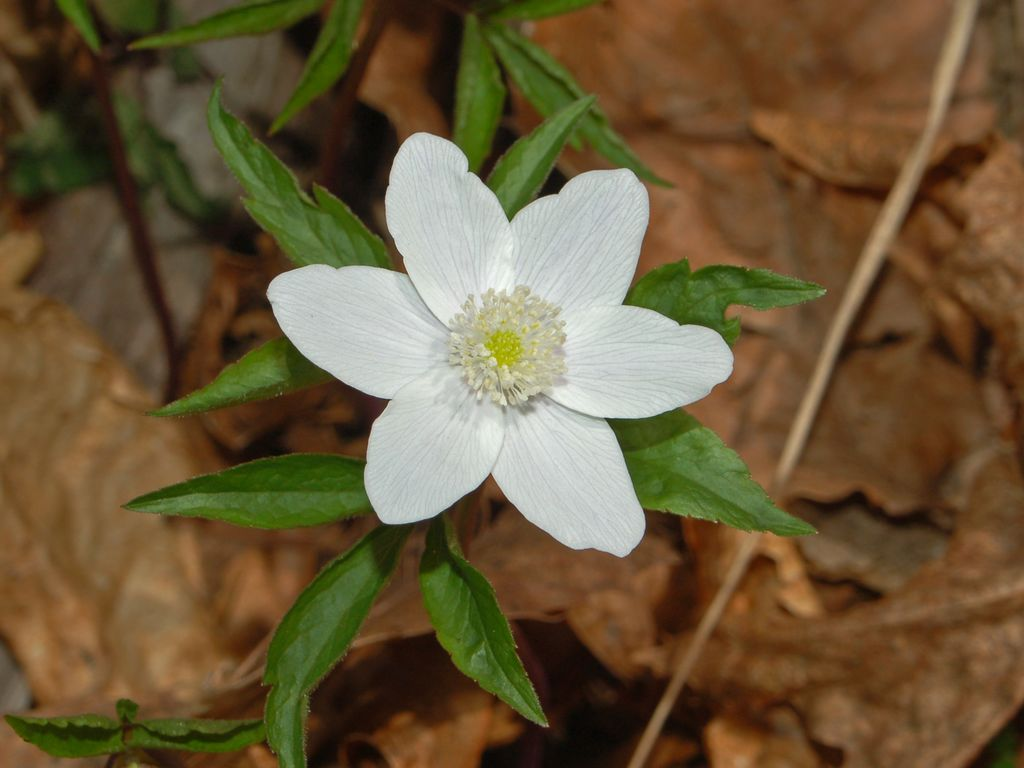

Scientific classification
- Kingdom: Plantae
- Clade: Embryophytes
- Clade: Tracheophytes
- Clade: Spermatophytes
- Clade: Angiosperms
- Clade: Eudicots
- Order: Ranunculales
- Family: Ranunculaceae
- Genus: Anemonoides
- Species: A. trifolia

Binomial name
- Anemonoides trifolia (L.) Holub

Synonyms
- Anemonanthea trifolia (L.) Nieuwl.; Anemone nemorosa subsp. trifolia (L.) Ces.; Anemone trifolia L.; Anemone trifolia subsp. brevidentata Ubaldi & Puppi; Anemonoides trifolia subsp. brevidentata (Ubaldi & Puppi) Galasso, Banfi & Soldano

= Anemonoides trifolia =

Species of flowering plant in the buttercup family

Anemonoides trifolia (syn. Anemone trifolia), the three-leaved anemone, is a perennial herbaceous plant in the buttercup family (Ranunculaceae).

== Description ==
The plant has stems growing 10–30 cm (3.9–11.8 in) tall and bear single, white (rarely pale pink or pale bluish) flowers two centimetres in diameter, with five to nine (most often six) elliptical tepals. The fruit is a cluster of 2 mm achenes. Its leaves are divided into three lanceolate leaflets and form a single whorl of three leaves per stem; the leaflets have a toothed but not lobed margin. The rhizome, found directly below the surface is whitish, and tends to form dense clonal colonies. In subsp. albida, the achenes are pendulous. The flowering period extends from April through June.

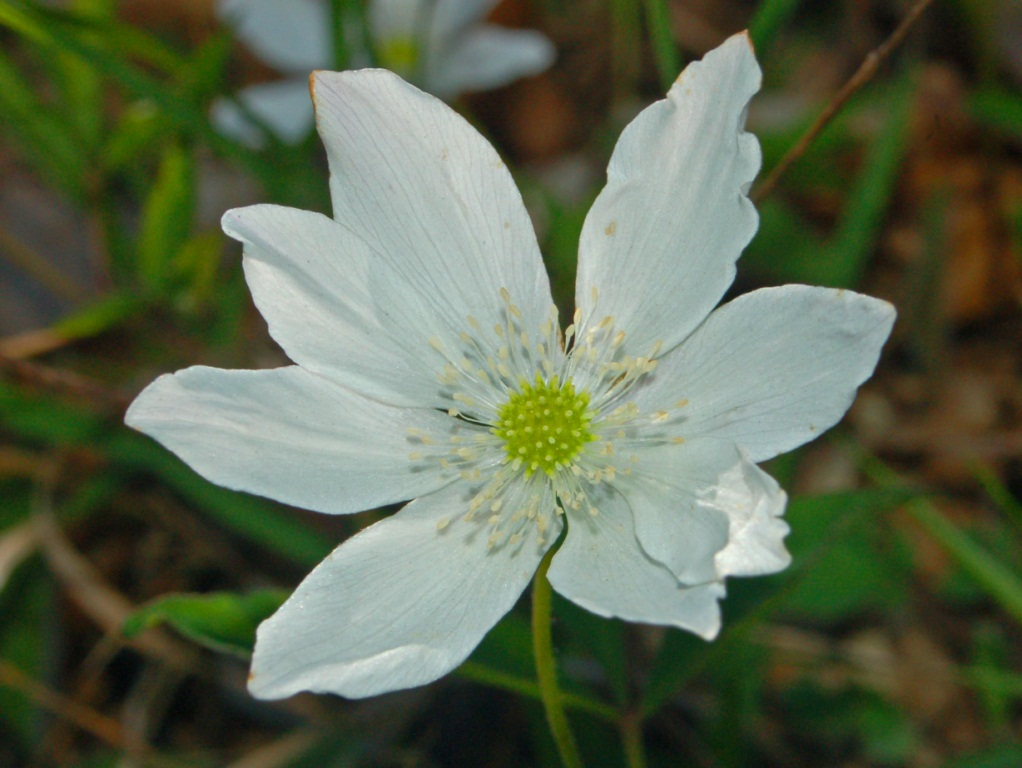
Close-up of the flower

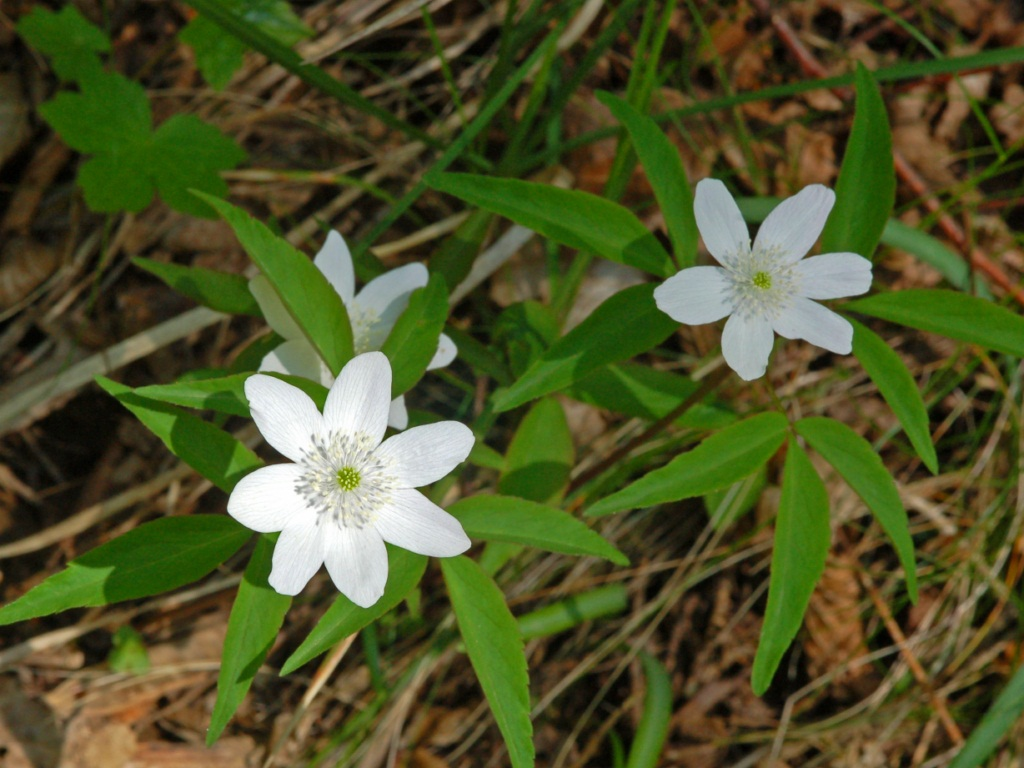
Plants

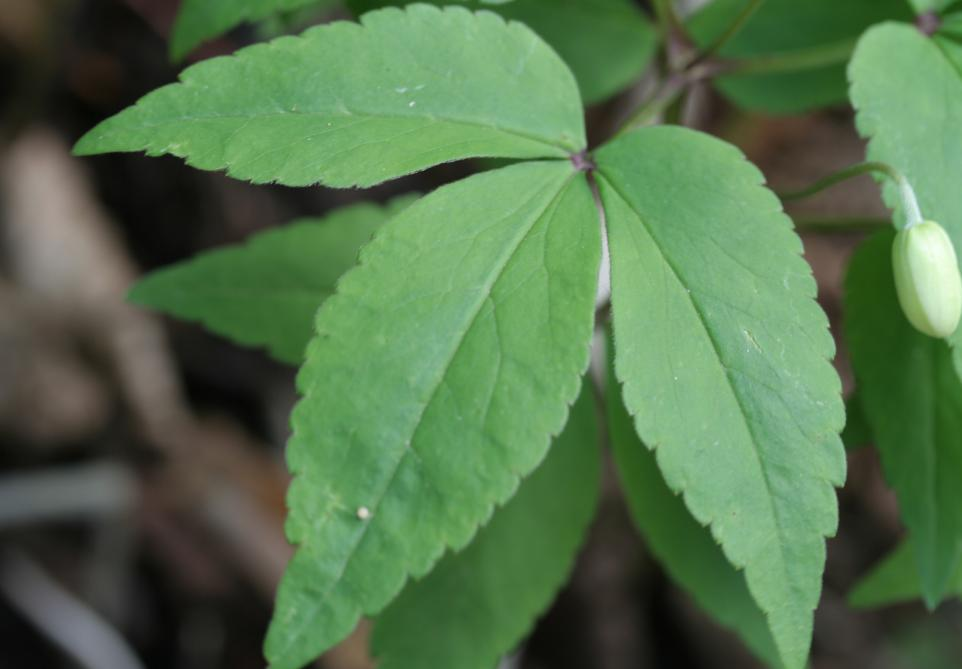
Leaves

The species differs from Anemonoides nemorosa in its white or pale blue anthers (unlike the yellow anthers of A. nemorosa) and simple lanceolate leaflets lacking the deep lobing of A. nemorosa.

== Distribution ==
Anemonoides trifolia is very similar to Anemonoides nemorosa, but has a more restricted range in southern and central Europe, from Portugal and Spain east to Hungary, and locally north to Finland, where one small population occurs.

== Habitat ==
It occurs in hardwood forests and rocky sites up to 1,860 metres (6,100 ft) of altitude.

== Subspecies ==
The Portuguese and Spanish populations are distinguished as A. trifolia subsp. albida, with the remaining populations being A. trifolia subsp. trifolia.
