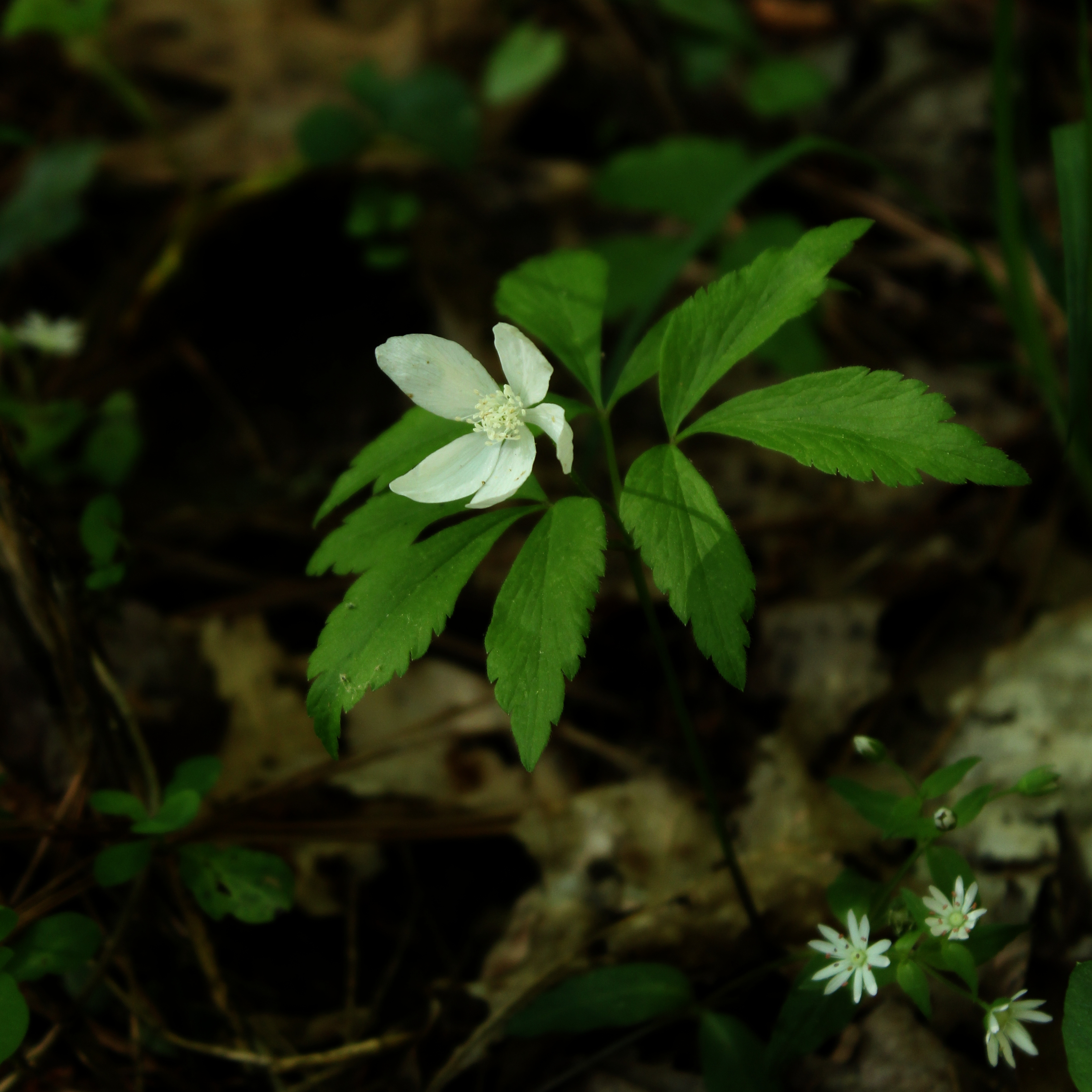
- At the Uwharrie National Forest in North Carolina

Scientific classification
- Kingdom: Plantae
- Clade: Embryophytes
- Clade: Tracheophytes
- Clade: Spermatophytes
- Clade: Angiosperms
- Clade: Eudicots
- Order: Ranunculales
- Family: Ranunculaceae
- Genus: Anemonoides
- Species: A. lancifolia

Binomial name
- Anemonoides lancifolia (Pursh.) Holub

Synonyms
- Anemone lancifolia Pursh; Anemone quinquefolia var. lancifolia (Pursh) Fosberg; Anemone trifolia subsp. lancifolia (Pursh) Hiitonen

= Anemonoides lancifolia =

Species of flowering plant in the buttercup family

Anemonoides lancifolia (formerly known as Anemone lancifolia), the lanceleaf anemone or mountain thimbleweed, is an herbaceous plant species in the family Ranunculaceae. The genus occurs in the Southeastern United States. Plants grow 20 to 30 cm (7.9 to 11.8 in) tall, growing from a horizontally-orientated rhizome, flowering mid-spring to early summer. The flowers have white sepals that are 12–20 mm long. This species much resembles Anemonoides quinquefolia, of which it was formerly considered a subspecies, except that it is larger growing. After flowering, fruits called achenes are formed in a small cluster; each achene is 3.5–5 mm long, lacks wings and has a straight or partly curved beak that is 1–1.5 mm long.

Both the Latin and common names reference the leaf shape, with narrower leaflets, with a distinctive serration when compared to A. quinquefolia.

It is native to the eastern United States in North Carolina, South Carolina, Virginia, Maryland, and West Virginia. Anemone lancifolia is normally found growing in rich damp soils in woods.
