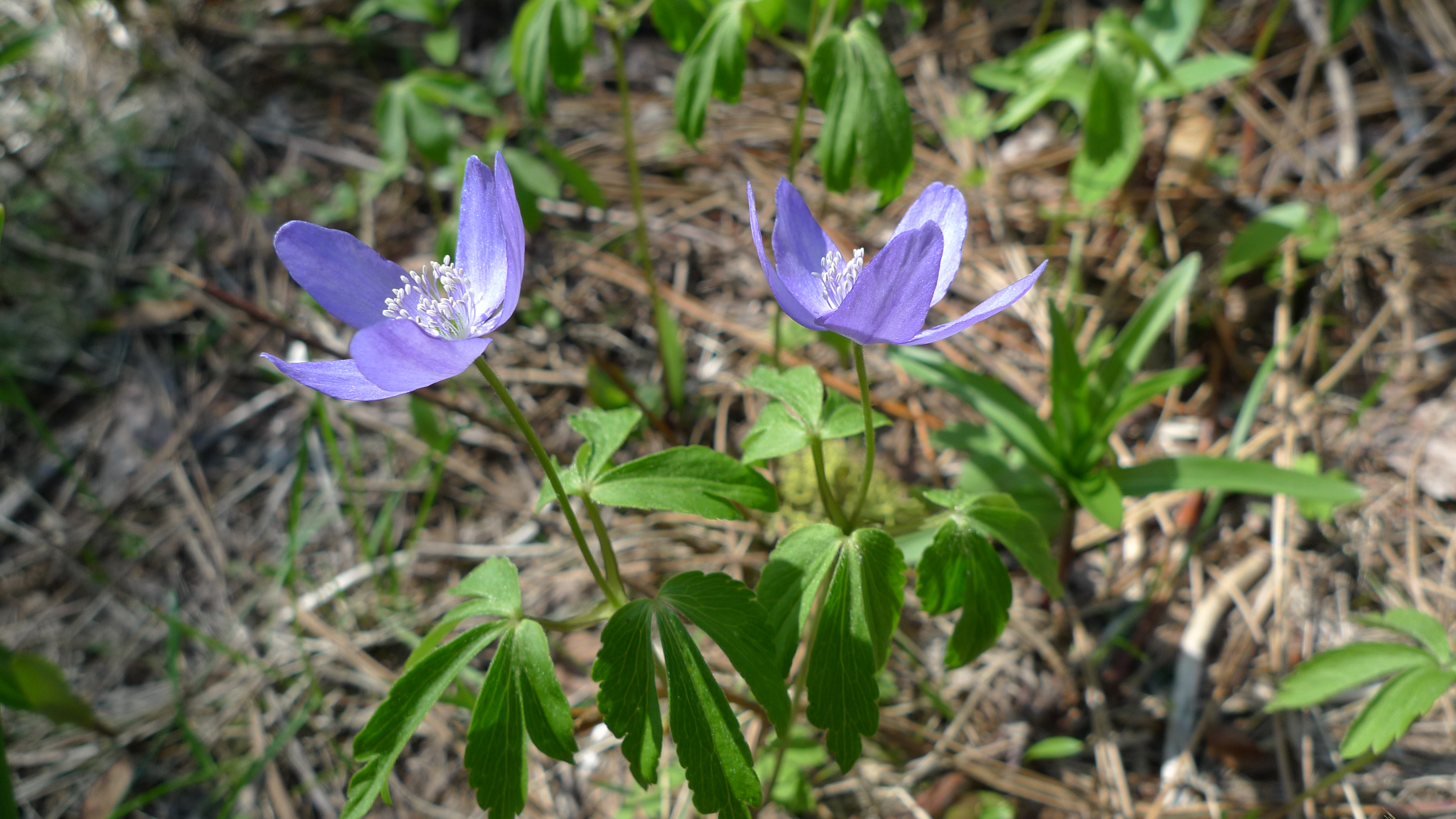
- At Leavenworth Ski Hill in Chelan County, Washington

Scientific classification
- Kingdom: Plantae
- Clade: Tracheophytes
- Clade: Angiosperms
- Clade: Eudicots
- Order: Ranunculales
- Family: Ranunculaceae
- Genus: Anemonoides
- Species: A. oregana

Binomial name
- Anemonoides oregana (A.Gray) Holub

Synonyms
- List: Anemone adamsiana Eastw.; Anemone adamsiana var. minor Eastw.; Anemone felix M.Peck; Anemone nemorosa var. grayi Greene; Anemone nemorosa var. oregana (A.Gray) Ulbr.; Anemone oregana A.Gray; Anemone oregana var. felix (M.Peck) C.L.Hitchc.; Anemone quinquefolia subsp. grayi (Behr. & Kellogg) A.E.Murray; Anemone quinquefolia var. grayi (Behr ex Kellogg) Jeps.; Anemone quinquefolia var. minor (Eastw.) Munz; Anemone quinquefolia var. oregana (A.Gray) B.L.Rob. Anemonoides felix; (M.Peck) Holub

= Anemonoides oregana =

Species of flowering plant in the buttercup family

Anemonoides oregana (commonly called Anemone oregana) is a species of flowering plant in the buttercup family known by the common names blue windflower, Oregon anemone, and western wood anemone. It is native to the forests of Washington, Oregon, and northern California in western North America, generally below 7,000 feet (2,100 m) elevation.

== Taxonomy ==
The Oregon anemone was first formally named by Asa Gray in 1887. It has sometimes been treated as a subspecies or variety of A. nemorosa or A. quinquefolia.

Two varieties are sometimes accepted:

- A. oregana var. oregana is found from Chelan County, Washington south to California and less commonly west of the Cascade Range.
- A. oregana var. felix is a generally smaller variety limited to coastal wetlands of Grays Harbor County, Washington, and Lincoln County, Oregon.

As of August 2020, Kew's Plants of the World Online accepts no infraspecific taxa of Anemonoides oregana.

== Description ==
Anemone oregana is a perennial herb growing from a thick rhizome, generally 50–300 mm (2–12 in) high, but exceptionally to 350 mm (14 in). A single basal leaf made up of three large leaflets on a 40–200 mm (2–8 in) petiole may be present. The inflorescence consists of a single tier of three leaflike bracts and a single flower. The bracts are similar to the basal leaf when the latter is present. The terminal leaflet may have a petiole or may be sessile. Its margin is sharply toothed on the distal half or third and its tip is pointed. Lateral leaflets may have a single lobe. The flower has no petals but 5 to 7 petal-like sepals in any of several colors, usually blue or purple but sometimes reddish, pink, white, or bicolored. In the center of the flower are up to 75 thin stamens. The fruit is a cluster of achenes.

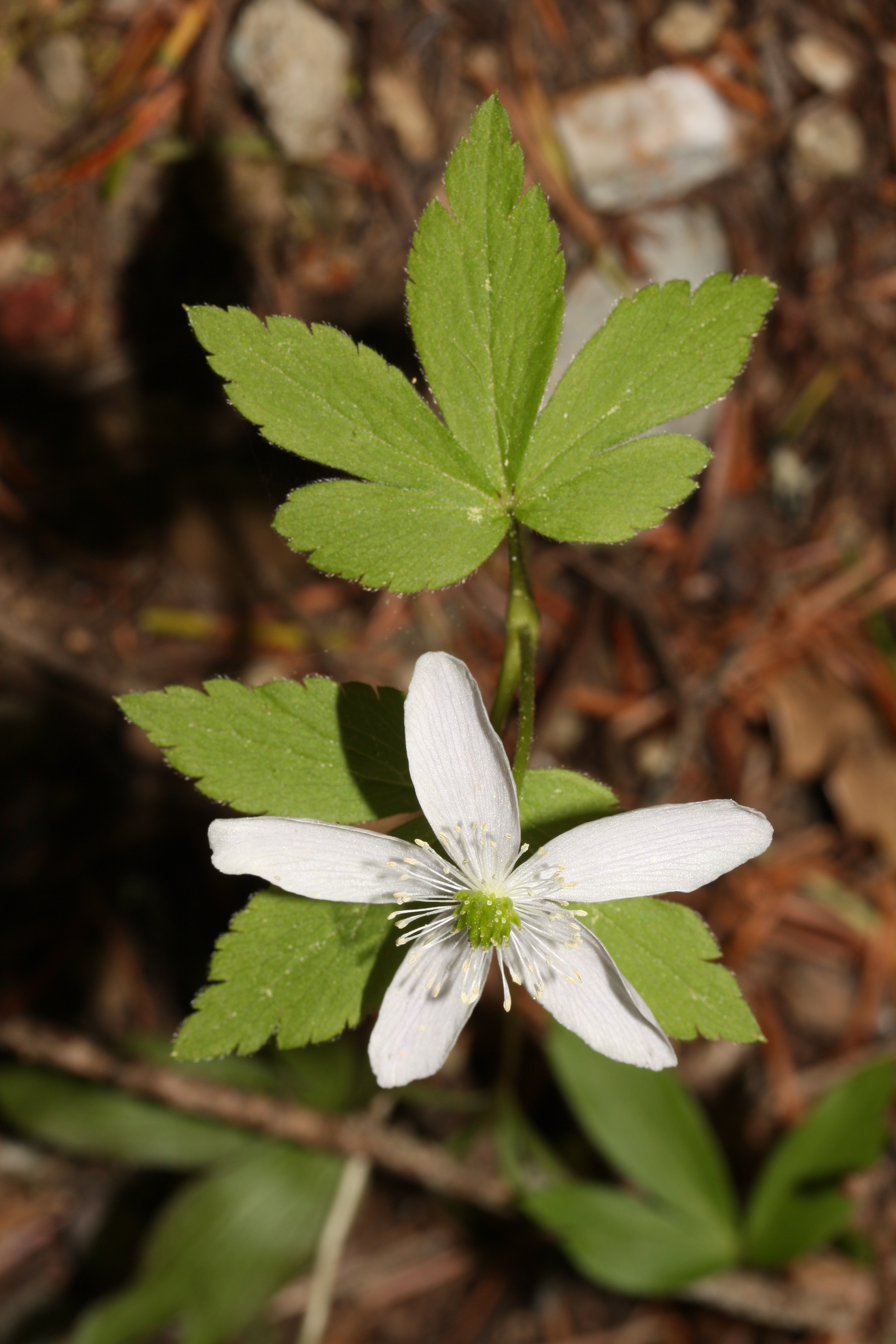
Lateral leaflets may be lobeless or have a single lobe as in this individual with white-sepals.

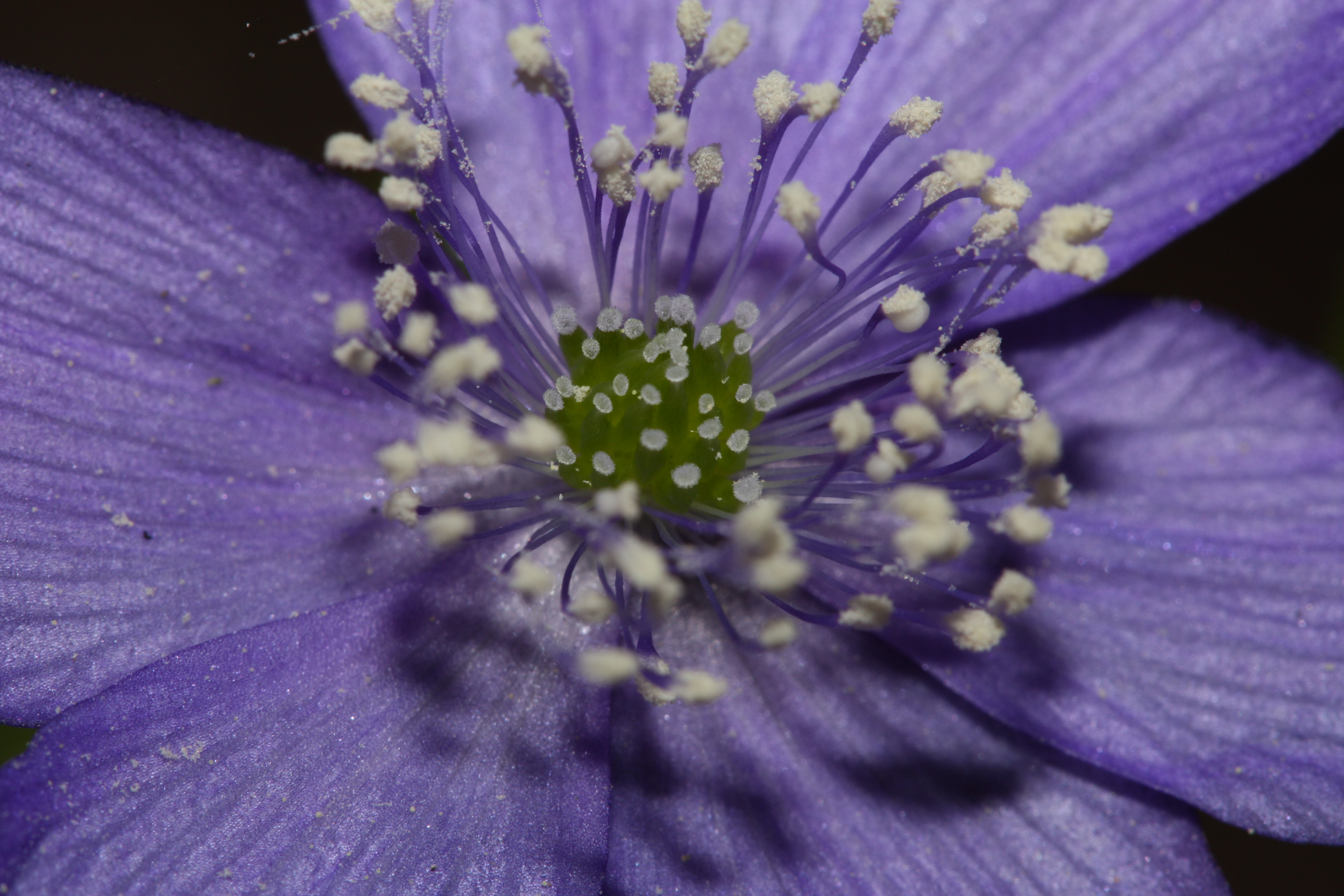
Pistils are clustered, short and numerous and surrounded by 30 to 75 much longer stamens. Below the flower are five to eight petal-like sepals.
