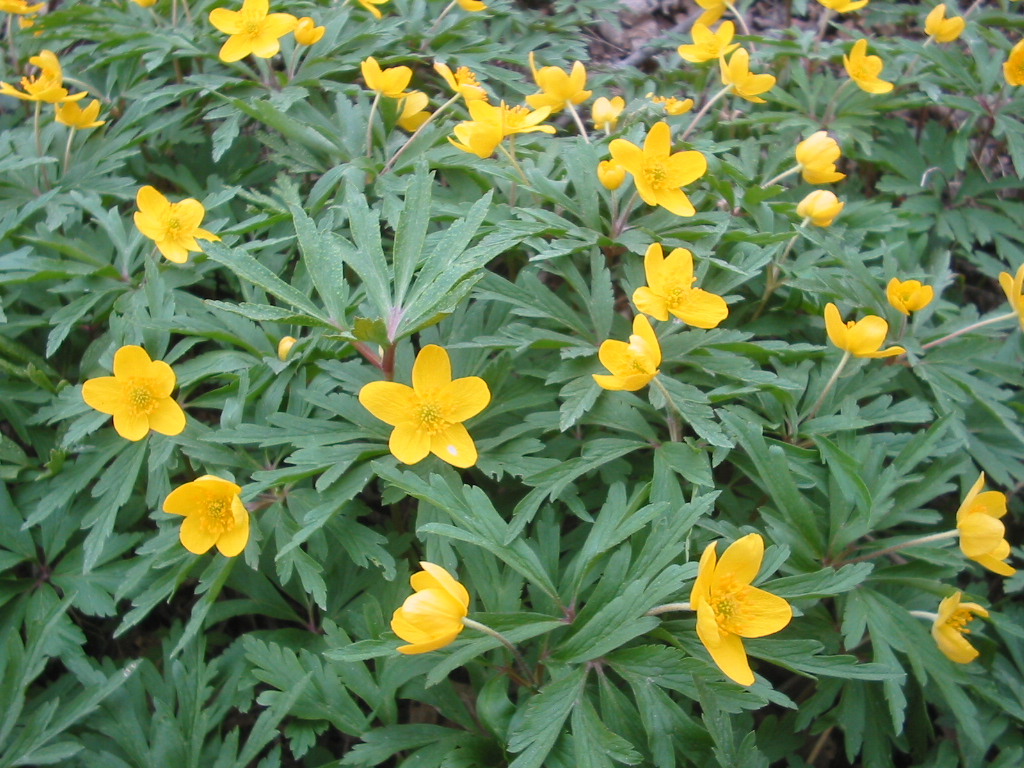
- In flower

Scientific classification
- Kingdom: Plantae
- Clade: Embryophytes
- Clade: Tracheophytes
- Clade: Spermatophytes
- Clade: Angiosperms
- Clade: Eudicots
- Order: Ranunculales
- Family: Ranunculaceae
- Genus: Anemonoides
- Species: A. ranunculoides

Binomial name
- Anemonoides ranunculoides (L.) Holub

Synonyms
- List: Anemanthus ranunculoides Fourr.; Anemonanthea ranunculoides (L.) Gray; Anemone lutea Lam.; Anemone nemorosa subsp. ranunculoides (L.) Ces.; Anemone nemorosa-lutea Crantz; Anemone ranunculiflora St.-Lag.; Anemone ranunculiformis St.-Lag.; Anemone ranunculoides L.; Pulsatilla ranunculoides (L.) Schrank

= Anemonoides ranunculoides =

Species of flowering plant

Anemonoides ranunculoides (syn. Anemone ranunculoides), the yellow anemone, yellow wood anemone, or buttercup anemone, is a species of herbaceous and perennial plant that grows in forests across Europe to western Asia, and less frequently in the Mediterranean region. It is occasionally found as a garden escape.

== Description ==
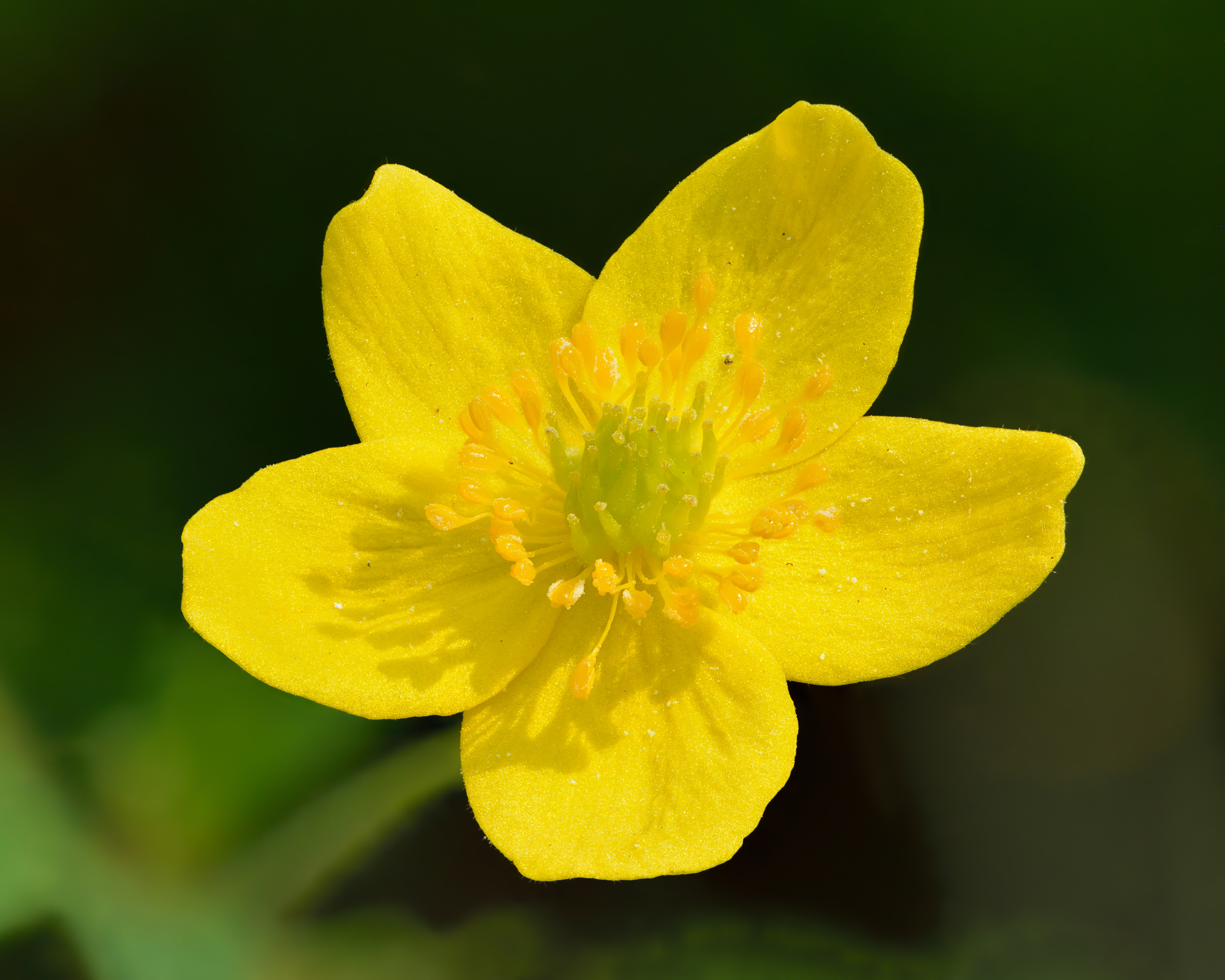

Growing to 5–15 centimetres (2.0–5.9 in) tall, the plant is herbaceous, dying back down to its root-like rhizomes by mid summer. The rhizomes spread just below the soil surface and multiply quickly, contributing to its rapid spread in woodland conditions. The flower is about 1.5 centimetres (0.59 in) diameter, with from five to eight petal-like segments (actually tepals) of rich yellow colouring. In its native range, it flowers between March and May.

== Distribution ==
The native range of Anemonoides ranunculoides extends across Continental Europe to southwest Siberia, reaching as far south as the Caucasus Mountains in Turkey. The species has been introduced into Great Britain and elsewhere. In Canada, there is a naturalized population at a well-known site in Quebec.

== Cultivation ==
The plant is widely grown as a garden plant, especially by rock garden and alpine garden enthusiasts. It has been awarded an Award of Garden Merit or AGM by the Royal Horticultural Society. The RHS describes it as H4 (hardy throughout the British Isles). The double-flowered form 'Pleniflora' (sometimes listed as 'Flore Pleno') is also a recipient of the award. 'Frank Waley', a larger-growing, more robust cultivar, is sometimes available, as are the miniature subspecies A. ranunculoides subsp. wockeana and a selection known as 'Laciniata', with finely divided leaves.

== Related species and hybrids ==
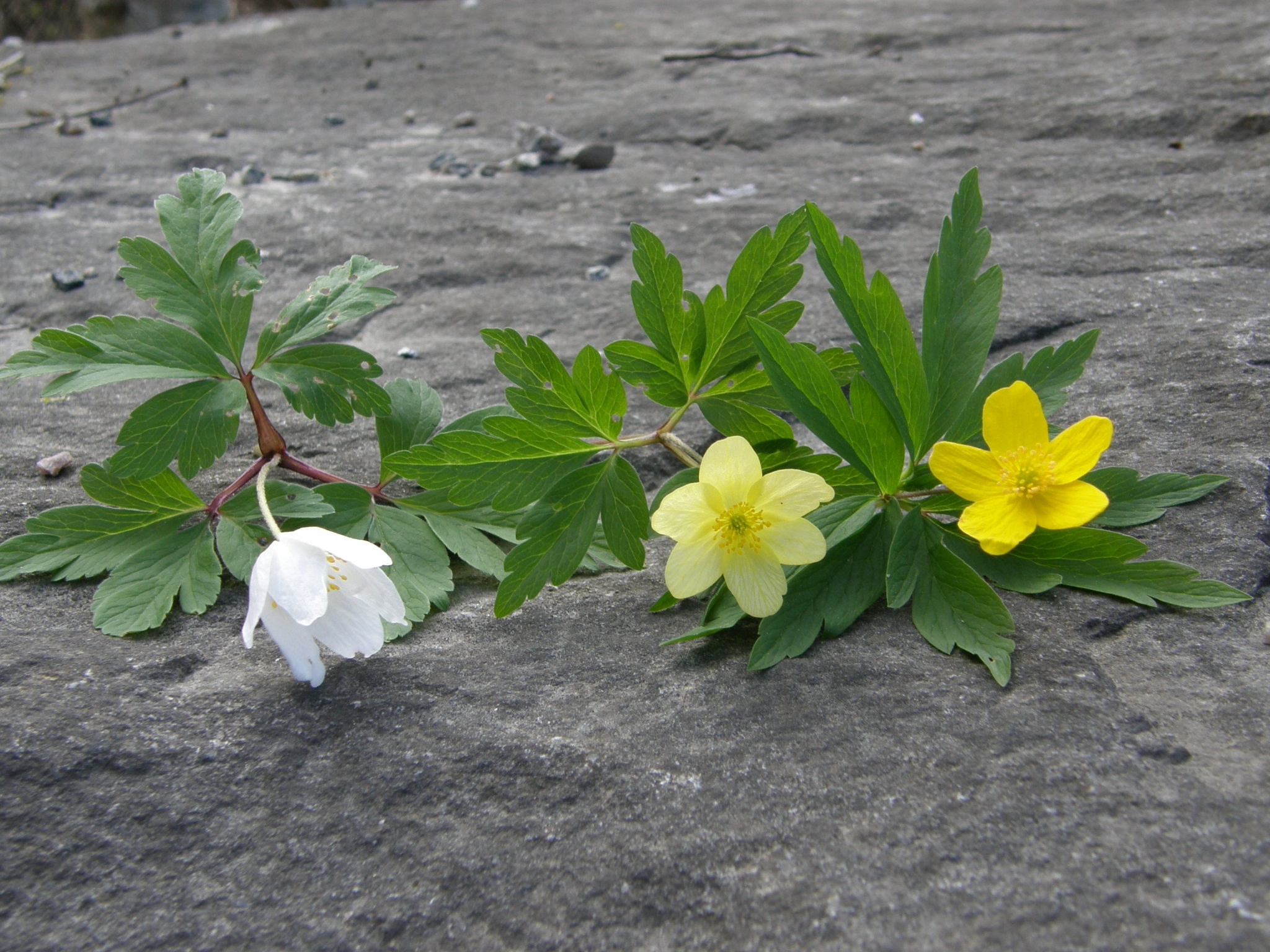
A. × lipsiensis, center, with its parents

Wood anemone – Anemonoides nemorosa – is similar to A. ranunculoides but has slightly larger flowers. A. × lipsiensis is a hybrid between these two species and has pale yellow flowers; it is often found where the two parent species grow near each other. A. × lipsiensis 'Pallida' is the best-known result of this cross. It has been awarded the Royal Horticultural Society Award of Garden Merit (RHS AGM).
