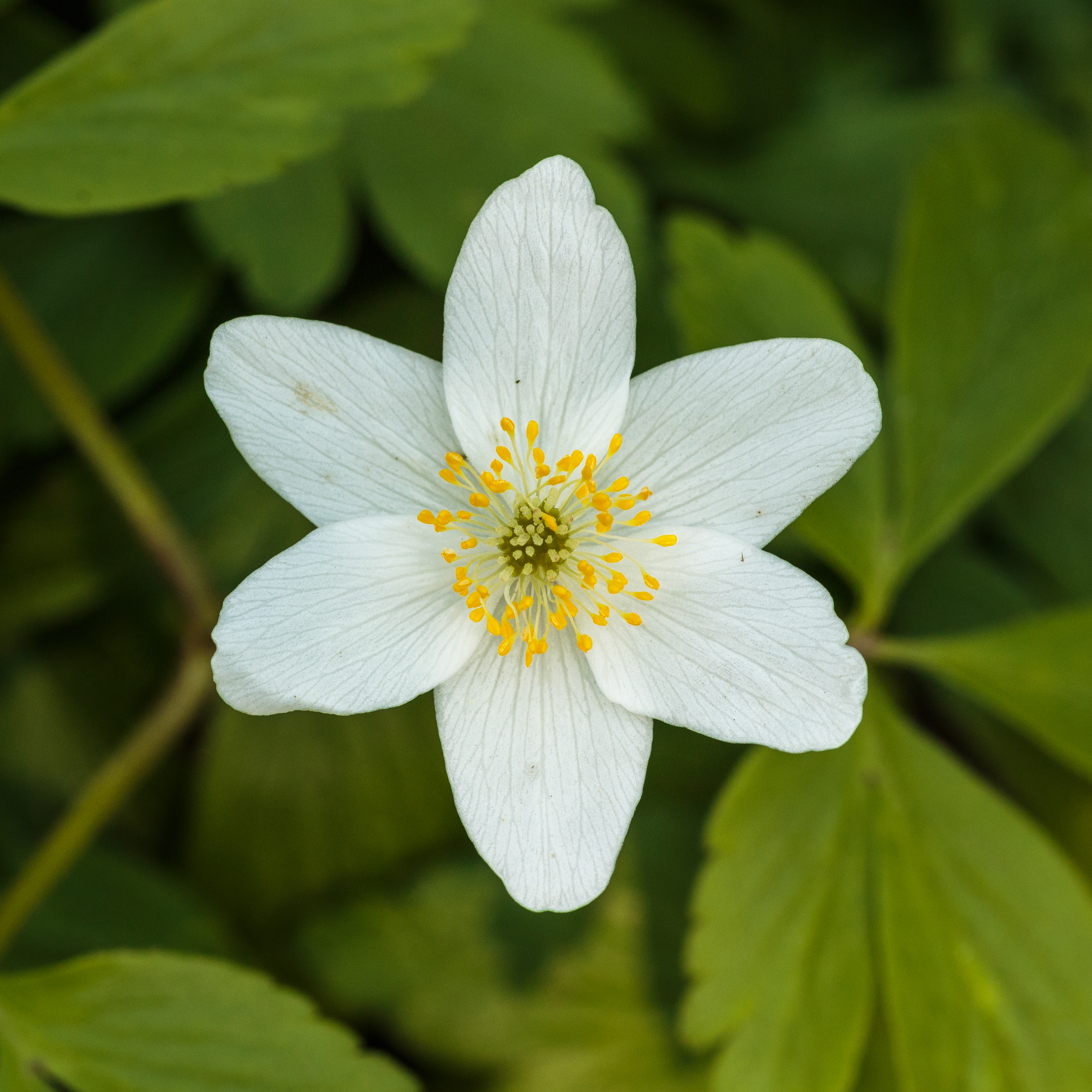
- Anemonoides nemorosa

Scientific classification
- Kingdom: Plantae
- Clade: Embryophytes
- Clade: Tracheophytes
- Clade: Spermatophytes
- Clade: Angiosperms
- Clade: Eudicots
- Order: Ranunculales
- Family: Ranunculaceae
- Tribe: Anemoneae
- Genus: Anemonoides; Mill.

Synonyms
- Aiolon Lunell; Anemonanthea Gray; Arsenjevia Starod.; Nemorosa Ruppius ex Nieuwl.; Oriba Adans.; Tamuria Starod.

= Anemonoides =

Genus of flowering plants in the buttercup family

Anemonoides is a genus of flowering plants in the buttercup family Ranunculaceae. Plants of the genus are native to the temperate regions of the Northern Hemisphere, on the continents of North America, Europe, and Asia. The generic name Anemonoides means "anemone-like", a reminder that many of the species were formerly included within the plant genus Anemone.

== Species ==
As of August 2020, Kew's Plants of the World Online accepts 35 species and named hybrids in the genus Anemonoides:

- Anemonoides altaica (Fisch. ex C.A.Mey.) Holub
- Anemonoides amurensis (Korsh.) Holub
- Anemonoides apennina (L.) Holub
- Anemonoides baldensis (L.) Galasso, Banfi & Soldano
- Anemonoides blanda (Schott & Kotschy) Holub
- Anemonoides caerulea (DC.) Holub
- Anemonoides caucasica (Willd. ex Rupr.) Holub
- Anemonoides davidii (Franch.) Starod.
- Anemonoides debilis (Fisch. ex Turcz.) Holub
- Anemonoides delavayi (Franch.) Holub
- Anemonoides exigua (Maxim.) Starod.
- Anemonoides glabrata (Maxim.) Holub
- Anemonoides grayi (Behr & Kellogg) Starod.
- Anemonoides griffithii (Hook.f. & Thomson) Holub
- Anemonoides jenisseensis (Korsh.) Holub
- Anemonoides juzepczukii (Starod.) Starod.
- Anemonoides × korzhinskyi Saksonov & Rakov
- Anemonoides lancifolia (Pursh) Holub
- Anemonoides minima (DC.) Holub
- Anemonoides nemorosa (L.) Holub
- Anemonoides nikoensis (Maxim.) Holub
- Anemonoides oregana (A.Gray) Holub
- Anemonoides piperi (Rydb.) Holub
- Anemonoides × pittonii (Glow.) Holub
- Anemonoides pseudoaltaica (H.Hara) Holub
- Anemonoides quinquefolia (L.) Holub
- Anemonoides raddeana (Regel) Holub
- Anemonoides ranunculoides (L.) Holub
- Anemonoides reflexa (Stephan ex Willd.) Holub
- Anemonoides sciaphila (Popov) Starod.
- Anemonoides stolonifera (Maxim.) Holub
- Anemonoides sylvestris (L.) Galasso, Banfi & Soldano
- Anemonoides trifolia (L.) Holub
- Anemonoides udensis (Trautv. & C.A.Mey.) Holub
- Anemonoides umbrosa (C.A.Mey.) Holub
- Anemonoides uralensis (Fisch. ex DC.) Holub
- Anemonoides yezoensis (Miyabe) Starod.
