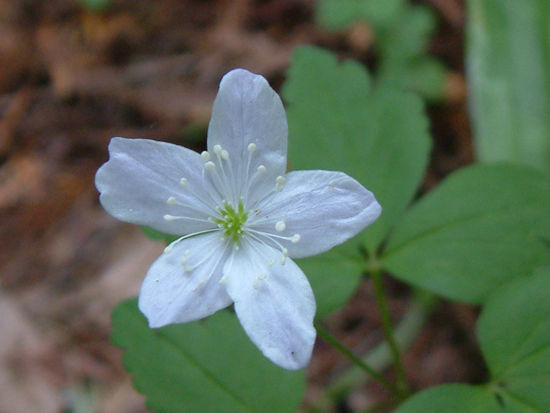

Scientific classification
- Kingdom: Plantae
- Clade: Tracheophytes
- Clade: Angiosperms
- Clade: Eudicots
- Order: Ranunculales
- Family: Ranunculaceae
- Genus: Anemonoides
- Species: A. quinquefolia

Binomial name
- Anemonoides quinquefolia (L.) Holub

Synonyms
- List: Anemonanthea quinquefolia (L.) Nieuwl.; Anemone nemorosa subsp. americana Ulbr.; Anemone nemorosa var. bifolia (Farw.) B.Boivin; Anemone nemorosa f. glabriuscula G.Lawson; Anemone nemorosa f. nitida G.Lawson; Anemone nemorosa f. quinquefolia (L.) G.Lawson; Anemone nemorosa var. quinquefolia (L.) Pursh; Anemone nemorosa f. trifoliata Ulbr.; Anemone pedata Raf.; Anemone quinquefolia L.; Anemone quinquefolia var. bifolia Farw.; Anemone quinquefolia var. interior Fernald; Anemone quinquefolia f. rubra J.W.Moore; Nemorosa quinquefolia (L.) Nieuwl.

= Anemonoides quinquefolia =

Species of flowering plant in the buttercup family

Anemonoides quinquefolia (French: anémone à cinq folioles), a flowering plant in the buttercup family Ranunculaceae, is native to North America. It is commonly called wood anemone or windflower, not to be confused with Anemonoides nemorosa, a closely related European species also known by these common names. The specific epithet quinquefolia means "five-leaved", which is a misnomer since each leaf has just three leaflets. A plant typically has a single, small white flower with 5 sepals (but no petals).

== Description ==
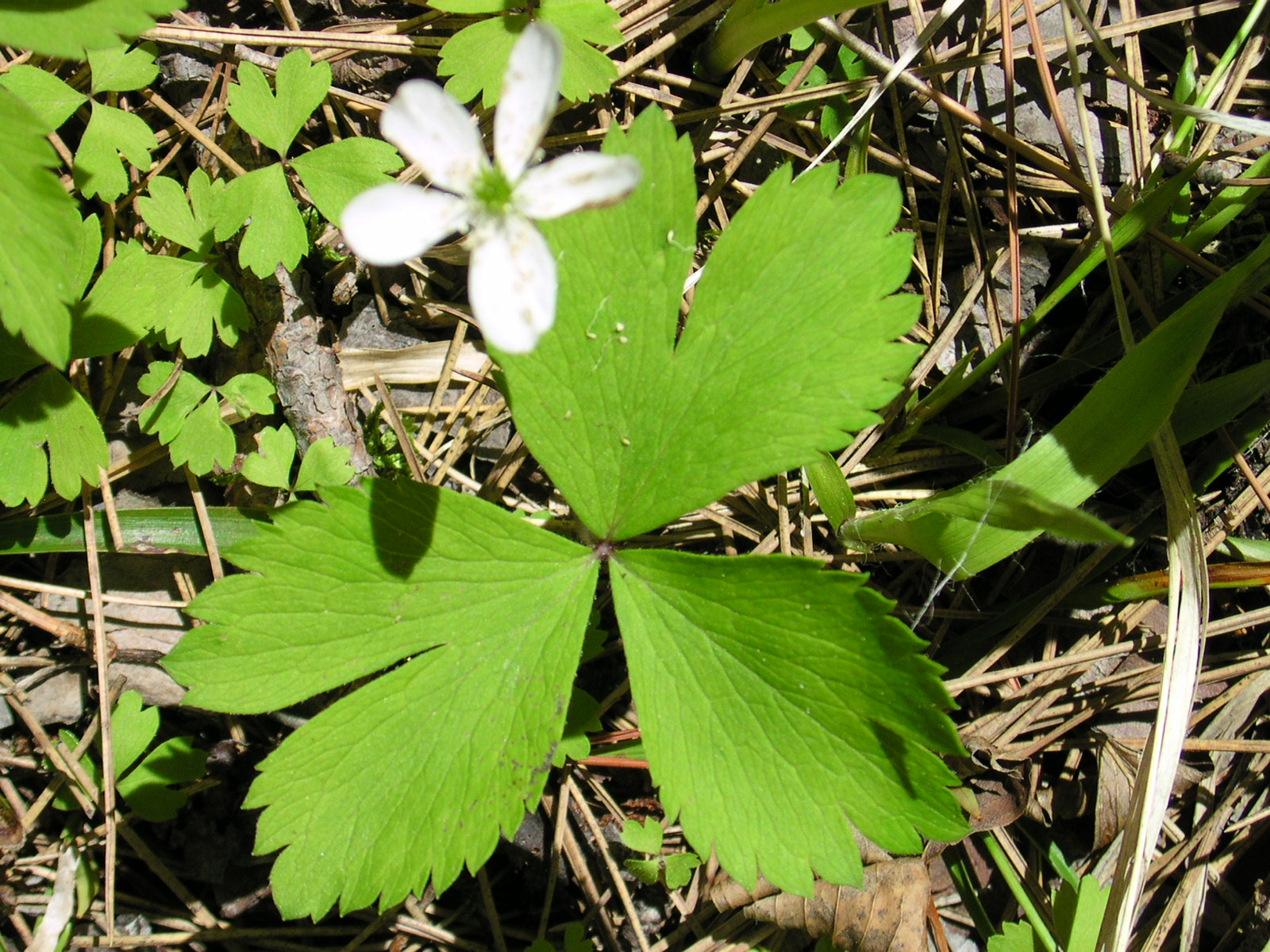
The leaf has three leaflets, but appears to have five.

Anemonoides quinquefolia is a perennial herbaceous plant with a horizontal underground rhizome 1–3 mm (0.04–0.12 in) thick. There are two distinct leaf forms: stem leaves and a basal leaf. The flowering stem (which includes the stem leaves) and the basal leaf emanate from the same base point on the rhizome, but since the rhizome is underground, this gives the appearance of two distinct plants, one flowering and one nonflowering. The flowering stem emerges first (if at all), followed by the basal leaf once the plant has flowered.

The flowering plant stands 5–20 cm (2–8 in) tall, occasionally reaching heights of 30 cm (12 in). A whorl of three ternate petiolate leaves (technically bracts) subtends the flower. The lateral leaflets of each stem leaf may be lobed, giving the appearance of five leaflets per leaf. Each leaflet is up to 5 cm (2.0 in) long, with serrate leaf margins (edges) and branched (not parallel) veins. The flower stalk rises directly from the leaf whorl. The solitary flower is 2–2.5 cm (0.8–1.0 in) across with 4–9 (usually 5) sepals (but no petals) and 30–60 white-tipped stamens. Each sepal is 6–25 mm (0.2–1.0 in) long and 4–8 mm (0.2–0.3 in) wide. The petal-like sepals are usually white but occasionally they are pink, or with a pink base and white tip, or with a white base and a pink or blue tip. The fruits are beaked achenes 2.5–4.5 millimetres (0.1–0.2 in) long, oblong in shape with hooked styles.

The single basal leaf is a ternate leaf with a petiole 4–25 cm (2–10 in) long. The long petiole (leaf stalk) rises directly from the rhizome. The lateral leaflets are usually lobed (even more so than the stem leaves), giving the appearance of five leaflets (hence the specific epithet quinquefolia, which means "five-leaved"). Each leaflet is up to 4.5 cm (1.8 in) long.

== Taxonomy ==
Anemonoides quinquefolia was originally named Anemone quinquefolia by Carl Linnaeus in Species Plantarum (1753). He described it as having five oval serrated leaves, hence the specific epithet quinquefolia, which means "five-leaved". However, this is a misnomer since each leaf has just three leaflets.

Anemonoides quinquefolia was described by Josef Ludwig Holub in 1973. The name has many synonyms. In particular, the species was previously treated as a subspecies of Anemone nemorosa, now known as Anemonoides nemorosa.

Anemonoides quinquefolia is a member of a species complex that includes A. grayi, A. lancifolia, A. oregana, and A. piperi. Members of the complex have remarkably similar morphology.

=== Infraspecific taxa ===
The Flora of North America accepts and treats two varieties of Anemonoides quinquefolia:

- A. quinquefolia var. quinquefolia, which occurs over the entire species range
- A. quinquefolia var. minima, which occurs only in North Carolina, Tennessee, Virginia, and West Virginia

The two are distinguished mainly by the size of the achene (the fruit), the body of which is 2.5–3 mm (0.10–0.12 in) in A. q. var. minima as compared to 3–4.5 mm (0.12–0.18 in) in A. q. var. quinquefolia.

Other sources accept additional varieties, such as A. quinquefolia var. bifolia, but Kew's Plants of the World Online lists no accepted infraspecific taxa for this species.

== Distribution ==
Anemonoides quinquefolia is native to North America. It ranges from Manitoba across the Great Lakes region to Nova Scotia, south along the Appalachian Mountains to central Alabama. Further west there are isolated populations in Alberta, North Dakota, and Missouri. It prefers moist open woods, thickets, and clearings. It is also found along streams and occasionally in swampy areas.

== Ecology ==
Anemonoides quinquefolia is a long-lived perennial geophyte that spreads by means of underground rhizomes. The small rhizomes are situated just below the surface in the humus-rich layer of decaying tree leaves. There the plant slowly spreads to form patches that can reach several feet in diameter.

An individual plant may take five years or longer to flower. A. quinquefolia flowers between March and June depending on location. It is a spring ephemeral with a very short growing season. It emerges early in the spring, reproduces quickly, and dies back to its rhizome by midsummer.

The flower of A. quinquefolia is nyctinastic, that is, the flower closes at night (and on cloudy days) and opens during the day. This habit protects the reproductive organs, maintains the viability of pollen, and may be a possible defensive strategy against herbivores.

A. quinquefolia is a myrmecochore, that is, its seeds are dispersed by ants. Each seed has a fleshy structure called an elaiosome, a nutrient-rich appendage that attracts ants.

The ranges of A. quinquefolia and A. lancifolia overlap in the southeastern United States where the two species interbreed. The resulting hybrids have intermediate characteristics, which makes identification extremely difficult.
