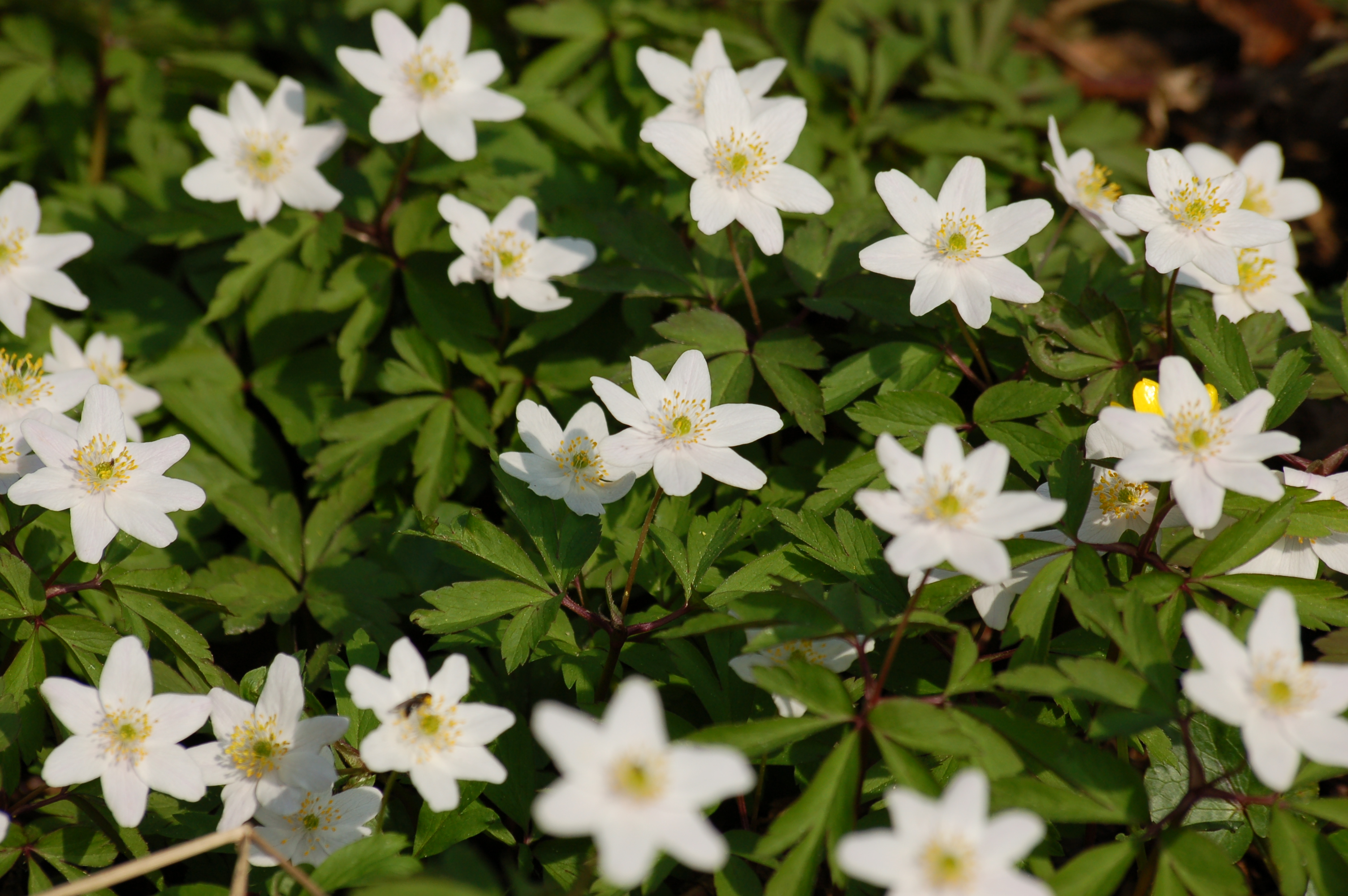

Scientific classification
- Kingdom: Plantae
- Clade: Embryophytes
- Clade: Tracheophytes
- Clade: Spermatophytes
- Clade: Angiosperms
- Clade: Eudicots
- Order: Ranunculales
- Family: Ranunculaceae
- Genus: Anemonoides
- Species: A. nemorosa

Binomial name
- Anemonoides nemorosa (L.) Holub
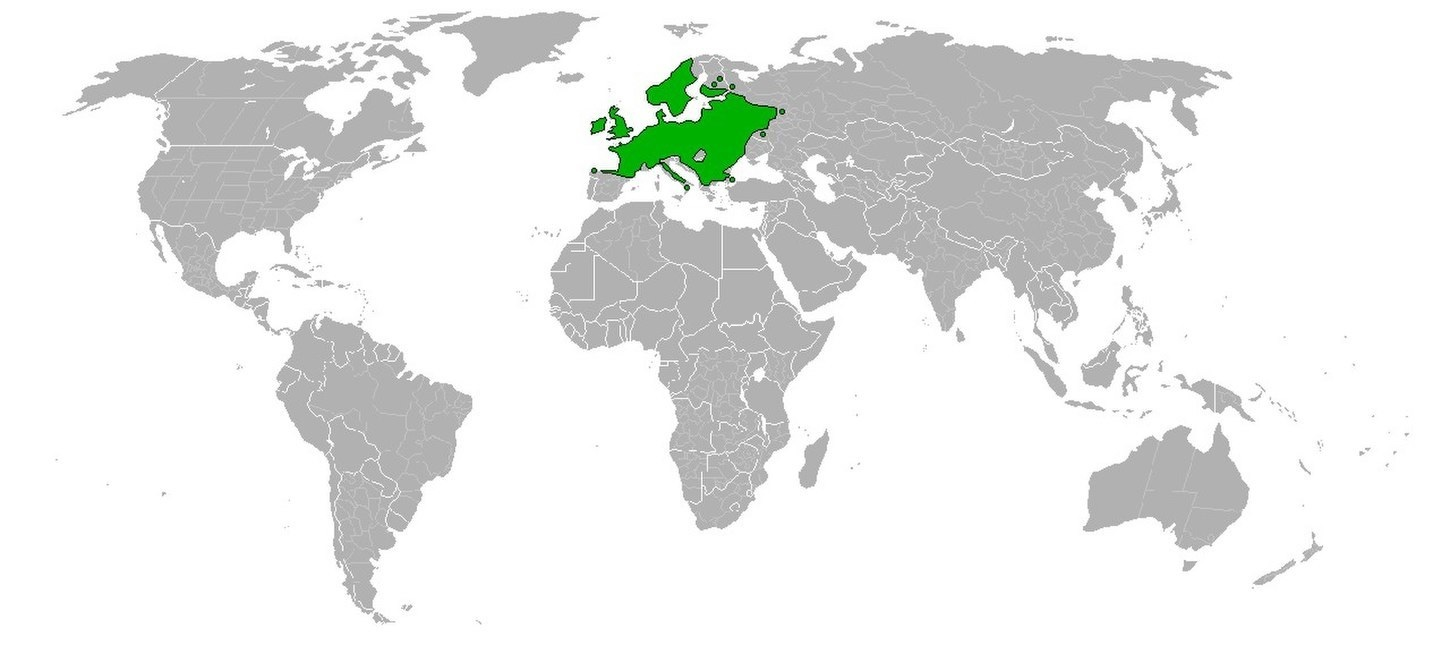

Synonyms
- Anemanthus nemorosus (L.) Fourr.; Anemonanthea nemorosa (L.) Gray; Anemone nemorosa L.; Anemone nemorosa f. vulgaris Ulbr.; Anemone nemorosa-alba Crantz; Anemone pentaphylla Hook. ex Pritz.; Pulsatilla nemorosa (L.) Schrank

= Anemonoides nemorosa =

Species of flowering plant in the buttercup family

Anemonoides nemorosa (syn. Anemone nemorosa), the wood anemone, also historically known as windflower because of William Turner's interpretation of its Latin name anemone in his 1551 New Herball, is an early spring flowering plant in the buttercup family Ranunculaceae, native to Europe. It is a perennial herbaceous plant growing 5–15 cm (2–6 in) tall.

== Description ==
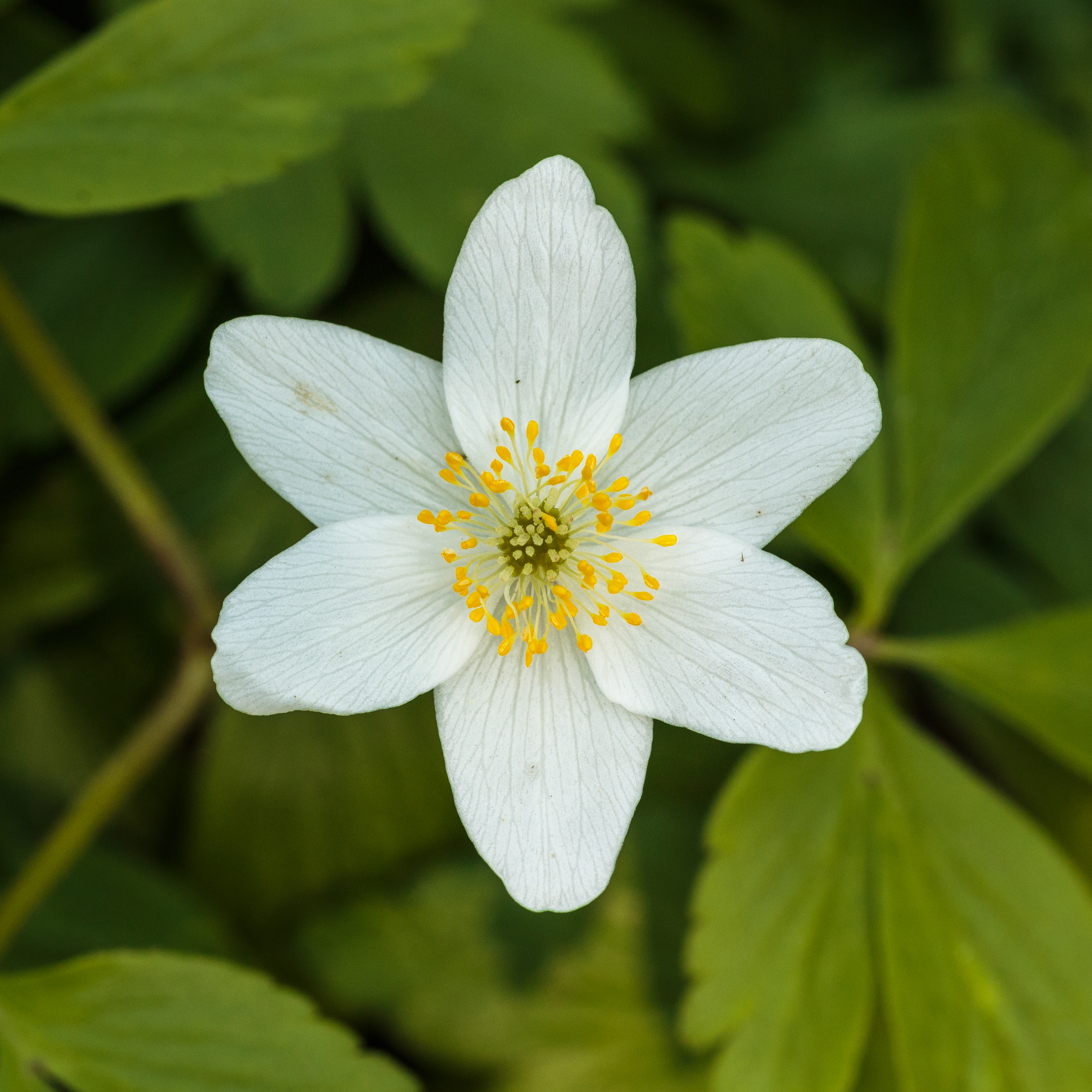
Typical flower

Anemonoides nemorosa is a rhizomatous herbaceous perennial plant less than 30 centimetres (12 in) in height. The compound basal leaves are palmate or ternate (divided into three lobes). They grow from underground root-like stems called rhizomes and die back down by mid summer (summer dormant).

The plants flower in spring, typically from March to May in the British Isles soon after the foliage emerges from the ground. The flowers are solitary, held above the foliage on short stems, with a whorl of three palmate or palmately-lobed leaflike bracts beneath. The flowers are 2 centimetres (0.8 in) diameter, with six or seven (rarely up to 12) tepals (petal-like segments) with many stamens. In the wild the flowers are usually white but may be pinkish, lilac or blue, and often have a darker tint on the backs of the tepals.

=== Similar species ===
The yellow wood anemone (Anemonoides ranunculoides) is slightly smaller, with yellow flowers and usually without basal leaves.

Wood sorrel Oxalis acetosella, which grows in similar shaded places, can be readily distinguished by its 3-parted, clover-like leaves and smaller flowers with five white petals and five sepals.

== Distribution and habitat ==
Eight A. nemorosa in the coat of arms of Raseborg

The native range of Anemonoides nemorosa extends across Europe to western Asia, reaching as far south as the Caucasus Mountains in Turkey. It has been introduced into New Zealand and elsewhere.

A. nemorosa is typically found in shady woods. The species is common in the British Isles; it often spreads slowly, so is sometimes used as an indicator for ancient woodland, though populations may also develop from deliberate human introduction in new woodland such as reclaimed land and parks.

There are naturalised populations in North America at some sites in Newfoundland, Quebec, and Massachusetts.

== Ecology ==
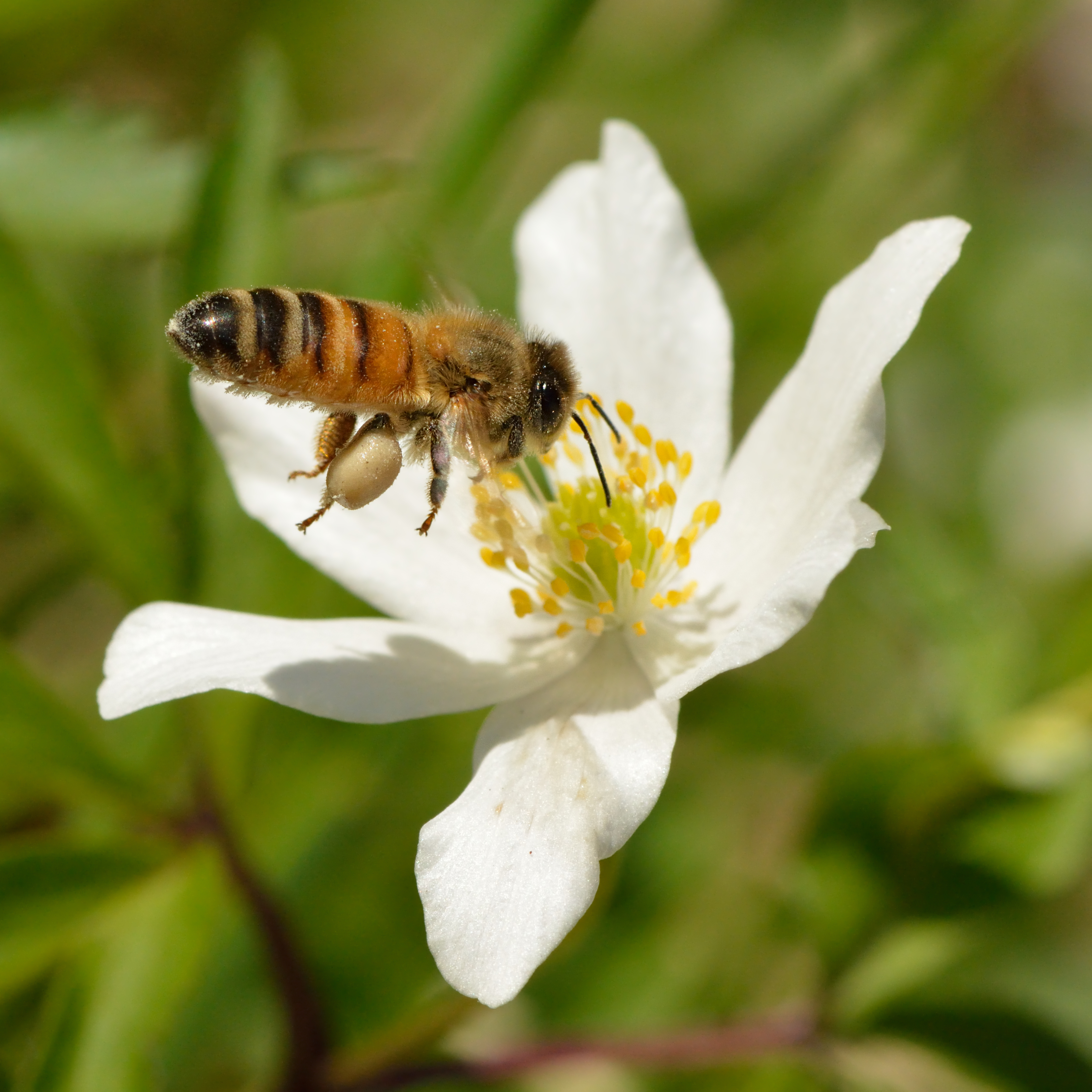
Pollination

The flowers are pollinated by insects, especially hoverflies. The seeds are achenes.

== In cultivation ==
Many cultivars have been selected for garden use. The RHS Plant Finder 2008–2009 lists 70 cultivars sold by nurseries in the UK. Some of the most widely available are:

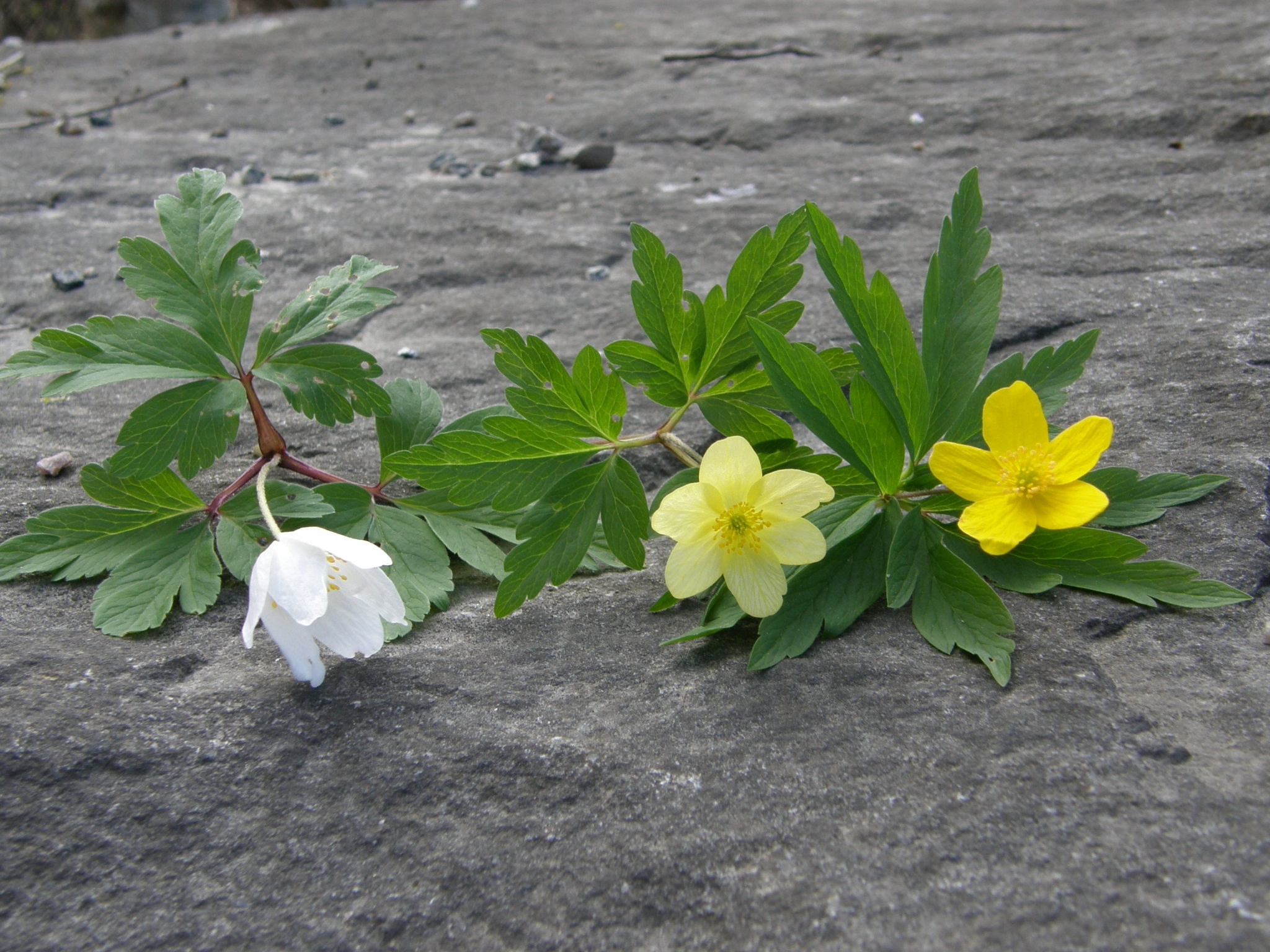
Anemonoides × lipsiensis, center, with its parents, A. nemorosa, left, and A. ranunculoides, right

- 'Alba Plena' – double white
- 'Allenii'agm – large lavender-blue flowers, often with seven petals (named after James Allen, nurseryman)
- 'Bowles' Purple' – purple flowers (named after E.A. Bowles, plantsman and garden writer)
- 'Bracteata Pleniflora' – double, white flowers, with green streaks and a frilly ruff of bracts
- 'Robinsoniana'agm – pale lavender-blue flowers (named after William Robinson, plantsman and garden writer)
- 'Royal Blue' – deep blue flowers with purple backs
- 'Vestal'agm – white, anemone-centred flowers
- 'Virescens'agm – flowers mutated into small conical clusters of leaves

Those marked agm are recipients of the Royal Horticultural Society's Award of Garden Merit.

Anemonoides × lipsiensis, a hybrid between A. nemorosa and A. ranunculoides, has pale yellow flowers; A. × lipsiensis 'Pallida' is the best-known result of this cross. It has also been awarded the AGM.

== Gallery ==
Anemonoides nemorosa in Flemingsbergsskogens naturreservat, Sweden

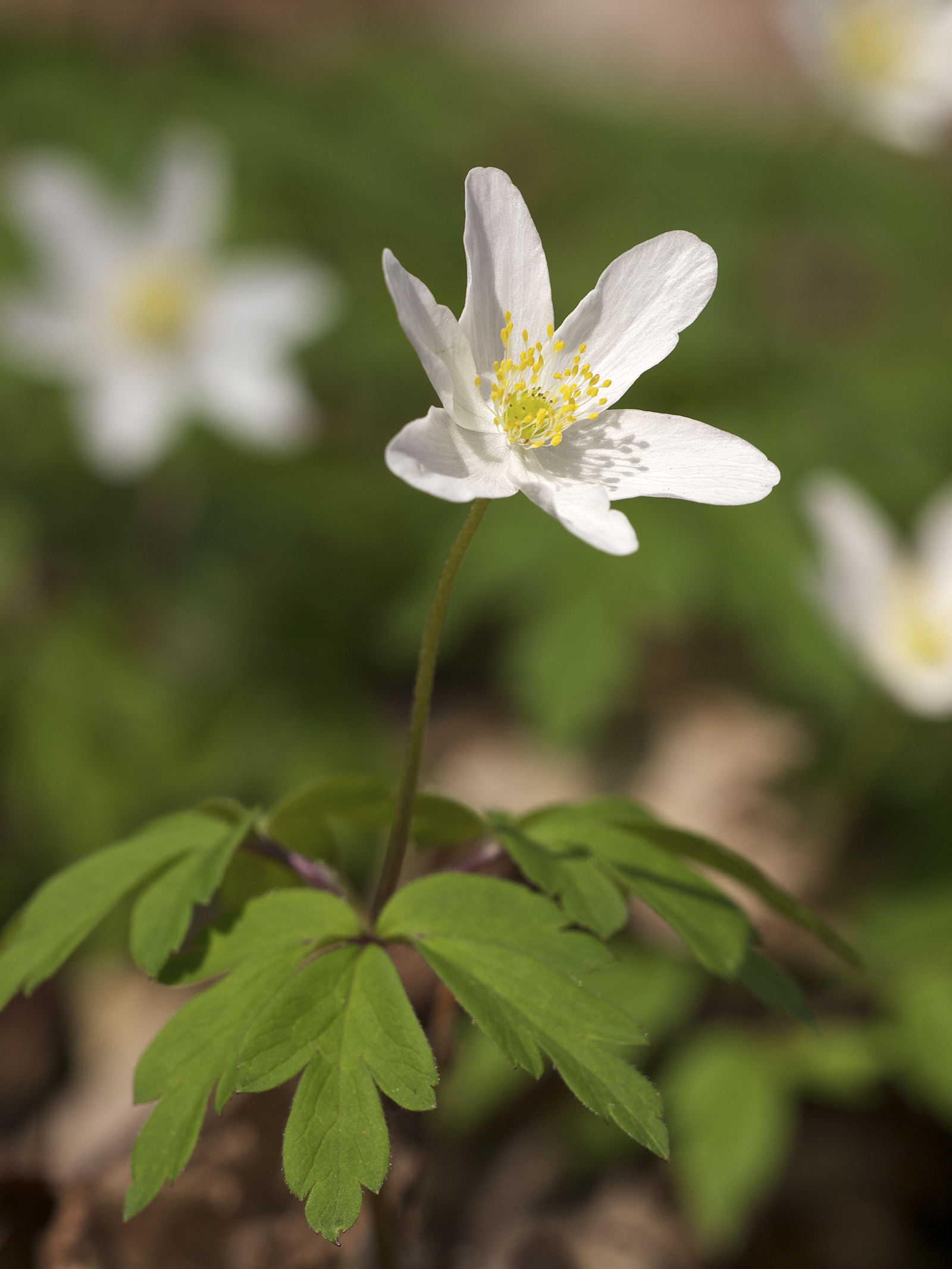
Form in Chemnitz, Germany

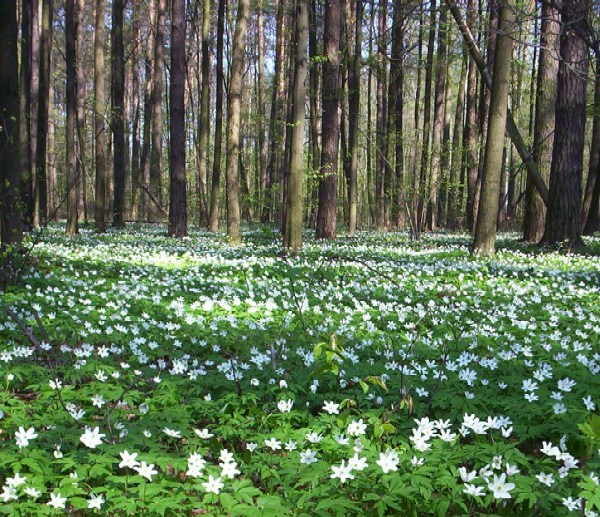
Colonial growth in forest, Radziejowice, Poland

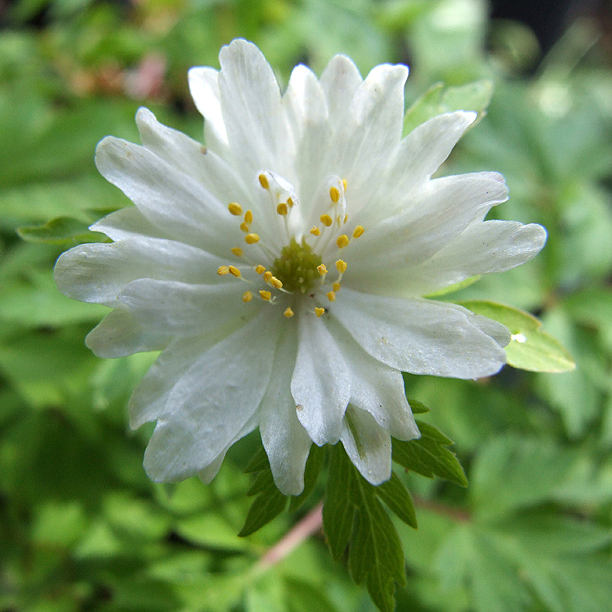
Double-flowered cultivar in Lincolnshire, England

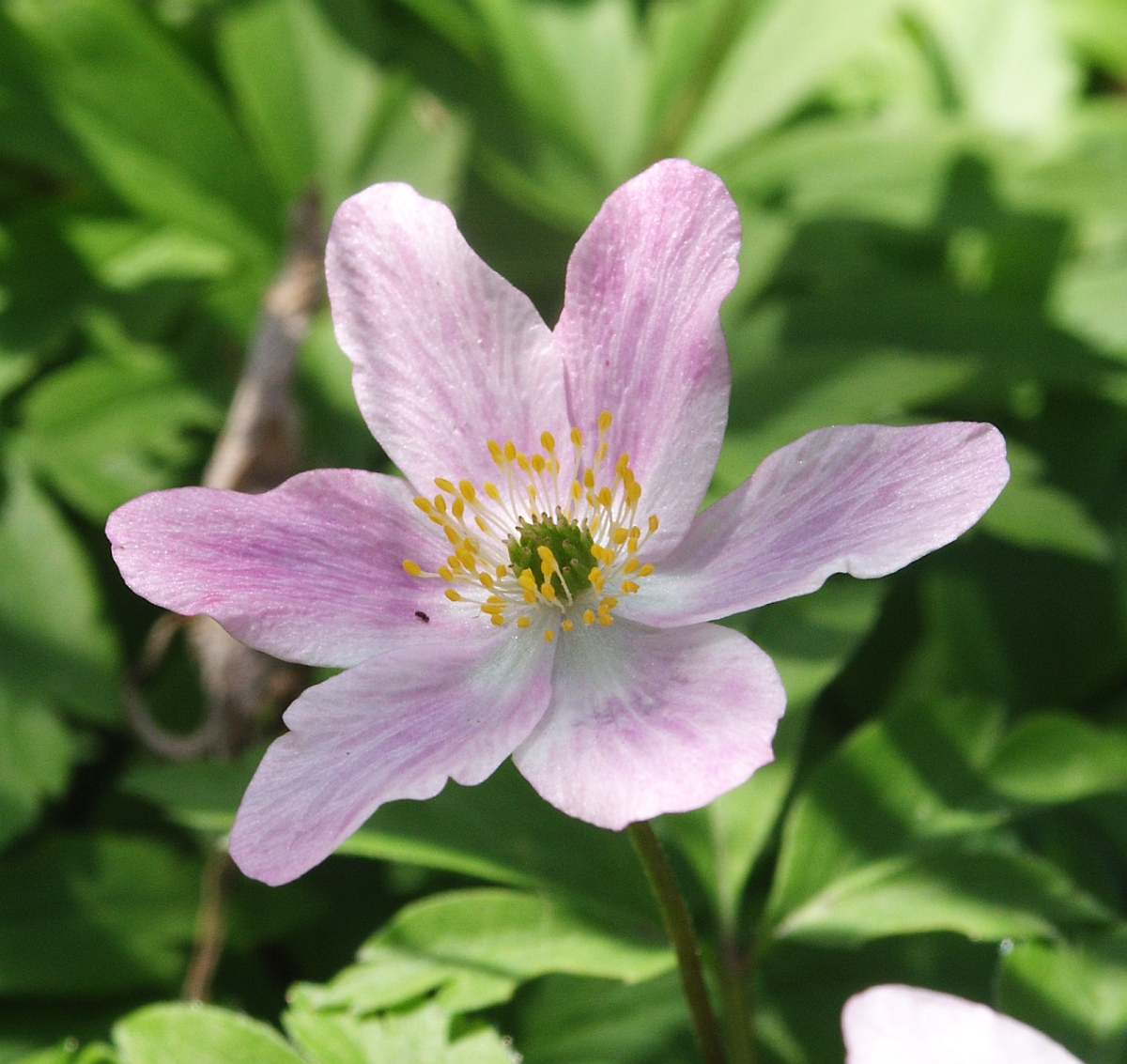
Pink-flowered plant in Hohenlohe, Germany

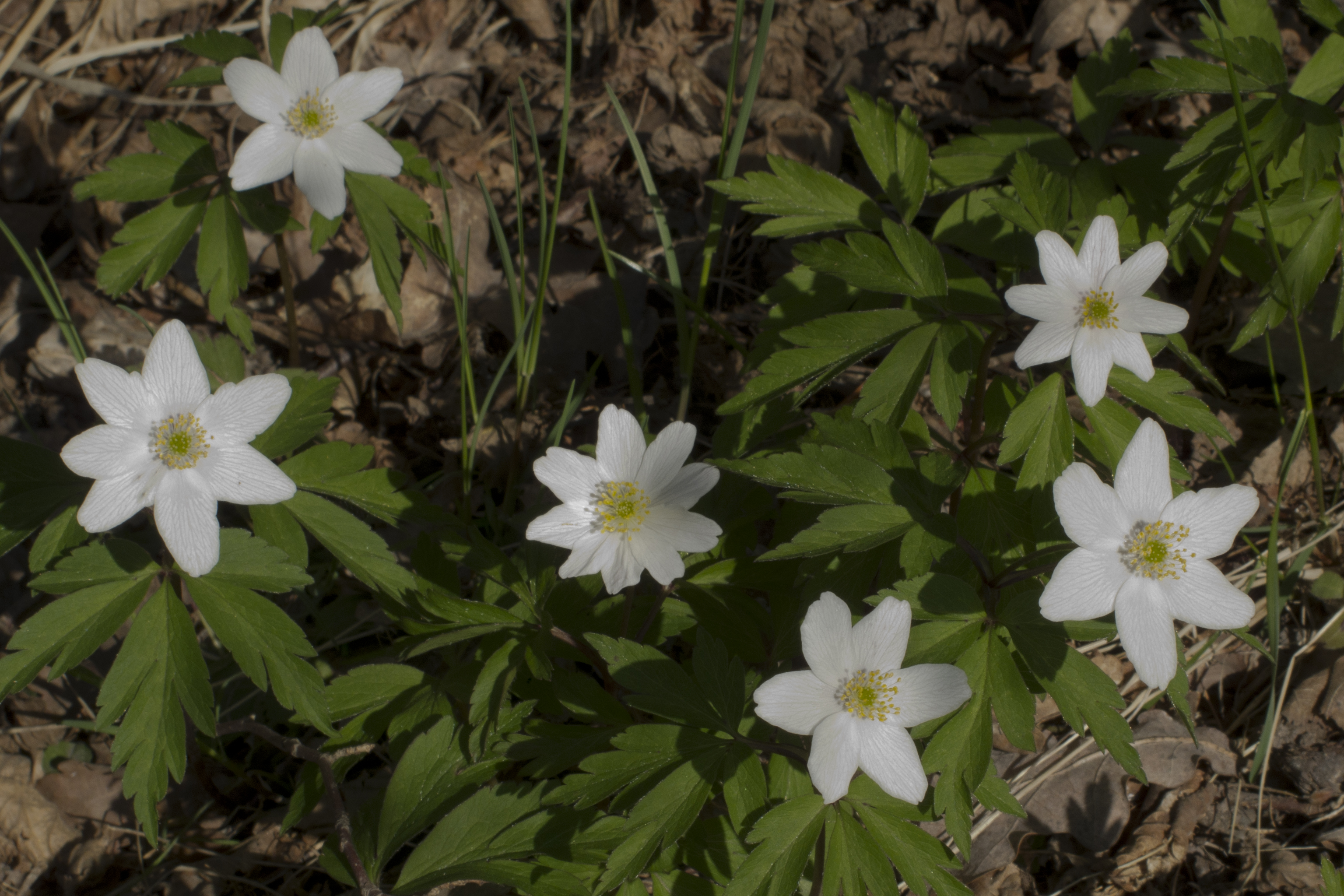
Flowers with six, seven, eight and nine tepals

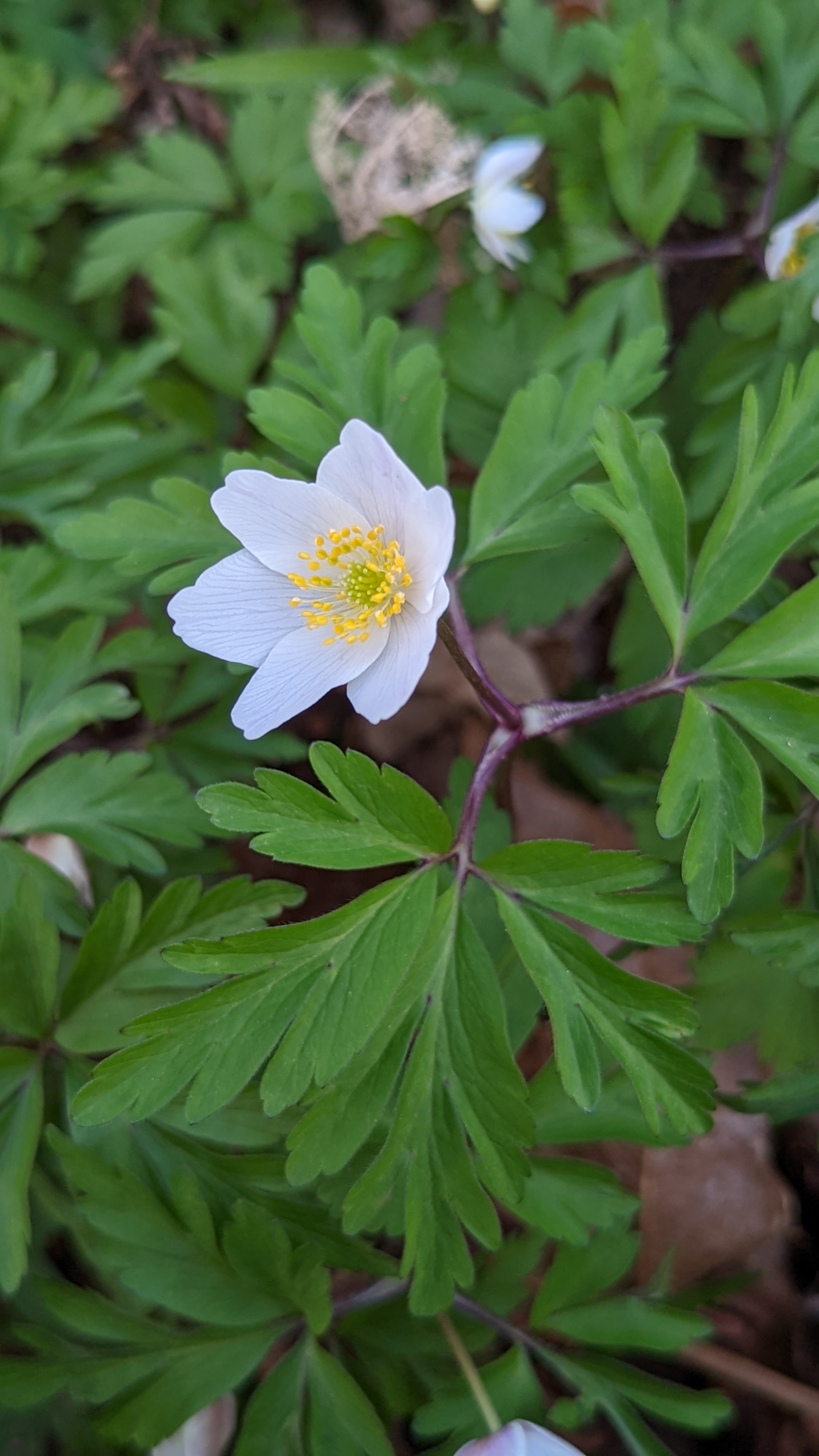
A flowering wood anemone

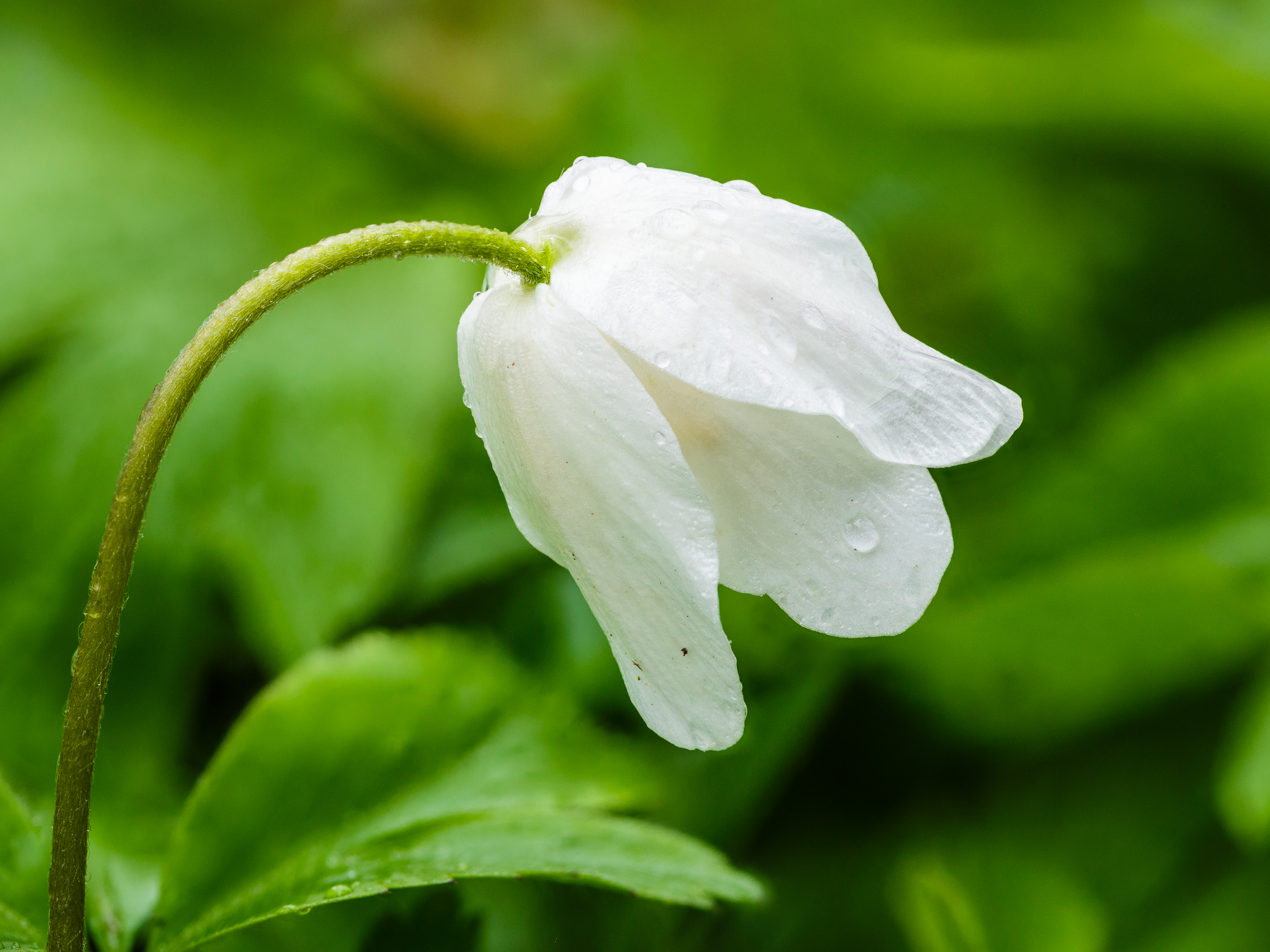
Half-opened fragile flower bud of a Anemonoides nemorosa
