= Indian heat wave =

Indian heat wave can refer to a number of major heat waves that have occurred in India:

- 2002 Indian heat wave, major heat wave concentrated in Andhra Pradesh
- 2007 Asian heat wave, heat wave in India and other Asian countries
- 2015 Indian heat wave, heat wave which impacted most of the country
- 2016 Indian heat wave, heat wave in India impacting 330 million people
- 2019 India–Pakistan heat wave, heat wave in India and Pakistan
- 2022 India–Pakistan heat wave, heat wave in India and neighboring countries
- 2023 Asia heat wave, heat wave in India and other Asian countries
- 2024 Indian heat wave, heat wave in India
- 2025 India–Pakistan heat wave, severe heatwave in India and Pakistan
