= List of Indian heat waves =

This is a list of serious heat waves in India.

Year	Duration	Max. temperature	Deaths	Ref
1956		50.6 °C (123.1 °F)		
1995	June	45.5 °C (113.9 °F)	>350	
1998	May–June	49.5 °C (121.1 °F)	2,500	
2002	April–May	49 °C (120 °F)	1030	
2015	May–June	49.4 °C (120.9 °F)	2500	
2016	April–May	51.0 °C (123.8 °F)	160	
2019	May-June	50.8 °C (123.4 °F)	184 (Note: This figure is for the state of Bihar only. There were further deaths in other states)	
2022	March-June	49.2 °C (120.6 °F)	90	
2023	April–June	46.2 °C (115.2 °F)	111	
2024	April-June	50.5 °C (122.9 °F)	411	

== Difficulties in estimation ==
Recent computerization of healthcare and adoption of diagnostic codes like ICD-10 makes tracking of causality during estimation harder, resulting in underestimations, despite more complete data being available upon diagnosis.

== See also ==
- List of heat waves
- Climate of India
- Climate change in South Asia
- Climate change
- Heat stroke – ICD-10 code: T67
