= 2025 India–Pakistan heat wave =

Severe heatwave in India and Pakistan

Meteorological history
- Duration: April - 10 July 2025
- Heat wave
- Max temp: 48.0 °C (118.4 °F), recorded at Sri Ganganagar, Rajasthan, India on 12 June, 2025

Overall effects
- Fatalities: 455 (in India, including associated storms): April: 195; May: 260
- Areas affected: India, Pakistan

The 2025 India–Pakistan heat wave refers to a deadly extreme weather event of abnormally high temperatures that affected the Indian subcontinent beginning in early April 2025 and ending in July 2025. The weather phenomenon arrived earlier than the typical May–June summer heat wave season, and was characterized by temperatures significantly above seasonal averages across both nations. The event placed hundreds of millions of people under extreme thermal stress, creating widespread health concerns and agricultural disruptions throughout the region.

== Meteorology ==
The heat wave began affecting both India and Pakistan in early April 2025, with meteorological agencies in both countries reporting temperatures reaching 5-8 °C above seasonal norms. Weather authorities predicted the abnormal heat would persist longer than typical seasonal patterns, with the India Meteorological Department warning citizens to prepare for an "above-normal number of heatwave days" throughout April.

Meteorologists characterized the 2025 heat wave as part of a broader pattern of changing climate conditions affecting the Indian subcontinent. Climate scientists identified the region as particularly vulnerable to thermal extremes, with projections suggesting that by mid-century, parts of India could be among the first global regions to experience temperatures exceeding human survivability thresholds. Climate experts warned that socioeconomic disparities would likely determine exposure and adaptation capacity during extreme heat events. Communities lacking access to adequate housing, cooling technologies, and stable income sources faced disproportionate risks from increasing thermal extremes.

=== India ===
In India's capital of New Delhi, temperatures exceeded 40 °C (104 °F) multiple times during April, marking departures of up to 5 °C from average seasonal values and impacting the city's more than sixteen million residents. The neighboring state of Rajasthan registered extreme temperatures of 44 °C (111 °F) by mid-April.

Barmer, a city in Rajasthan, recorded a peak temperature of 46.4 °C (115.5 °F) on 8 April, representing a deviation of more than 6 °C above average April maximum temperatures for the region and breaking the decades-old April temperature records for the region. In Jaipur, the capital of Rajasthan, temperatures exceeded 40 °C (104 °F) for five consecutive days beginning 6 April. The city registered a peak temperature of 43.0 °C (109.4 °F) on 9 April, approximately 5 °C above typical April high temperatures for the location.

On 8 April, approximately thirty weather stations spread throughout India documented temperatures exceeding 43.0 °C (109.4 °F), with many areas classified as experiencing severe heat wave conditions according to official meteorological standards.

The extreme heat conditions triggered severe meteorological reactions in the eastern state of Bihar, including its capital city Patna. The meeting of sharply contrasting weather fronts generated intense thunderstorm activity characterized by frequent lightning strikes, significant hail, and powerful wind gusts. These severe weather events resulted in at least nineteen fatalities over a two-day period.

=== Pakistan ===
The southwestern Pakistani province of Balochistan was predicted to record some of the most extreme conditions, with maximum temperatures potentially approaching 49 °C (120 °F), comparable to readings typically observed in North America's Death Valley.

== Impact ==
Power demands for air conditioning systems in both nations increased dramatically, straining generation capacity and distribution networks. Extended power outages reported in multiple regions caused further thermal stress to affected populations.

=== India ===
The India Meteorological Department issued early warnings about the abnormal heat conditions in mid-April, particularly affecting the capital region and northwestern territories.

Agricultural communities in northwestern India reported widespread disruptions to farming activities and increasing cases of heat illnesses. Fieldworkers described symptoms including dehydration, nausea, and dizziness when attempting outdoor labor during peak temperature periods. In Bihar, agricultural products including mango, lychee, and wheat crops suffered extensive damage just weeks before scheduled harvests.

=== Pakistan ===
The Pakistan Meteorological Department forecast temperature anomalies of up to 8 °C above normal from 14 April to 18 April. The southwestern province of Balochistan experienced particularly severe conditions, with inhabitants of Dera Murad Jamali city reporting that the thermal stress arrived with unexpected intensity.

Extended power outages lasting up to sixteen hours daily exacerbated challenges against living conditions for many residents, eliminating access to cooling systems during critical high-temperature periods. The province faced additional water security challenges due to minimal rainfall and significant drought conditions during the winter months preceding the heat wave. Pakistani farmers reported accelerated crop development followed by reduced yields as plants struggled to cope with thermal stress and water scarcity during critical growth stages.

== Responses ==
Several regions in Gujarat state were placed under orange alert status on 10 April, indicating heat wave conditions in multiple districts and heightened probability of heat-related illnesses. Residents of impacted areas were instructed to avoid heat exposure while taking active measures against dehydration.

The Uttar Pradesh Government issued directives for hospitals to prepare for increased cases of heat-related illnesses. The state administration also alerted veterinarian teams and animal shelters to remain vigilant and ensure adequate shelter and water provisions for livestock and other animals under their care.

== See also ==
- 2024 Pakistan heat wave
- 2019 India–Pakistan heat wave
- 2022 India–Pakistan heat wave
- 2025 in India
- 2025 in Pakistan
