= JDC Foundation =

Pakistani non-governmental organisation

JDC Foundation Pakistan
- جے ڈی سی فاؤنڈیشن
- Formation: 2009; 17 years ago
- Founder: Sibt-e-Jaafar Zaidi and Association of Students
- Type: NGO
- Legal status: Foundation
- Purpose: Emergency Services, Martyred Shelters, Education, Healthcare, Ambulance Services
- Headquarters: B-24, Federal-B Area, Ancholi Block 20, Gulberg Town, Karachi
- Coordinates: 24.94610689575712°N 67.08079042137416°E
- Method: Donations and Grants
- Key people: Syed Zafar Abbas Jafri
- Website: www.jdcwelfare.org

Jafriya Disaster Management Cell Welfare Organization (JDC), commonly known as JDC Foundation Pakistan, is a welfare and non-governmental organization (NGO) mainly operating in Pakistan alongside the Fixit Headquarters.

It was established in 2009 by Sibt-e-Jaffaar Zaidi and some like-minded youths in Karachi. Syed Zafar Abbas Jafri was also one of its founding members.

It operates an ambulance set-up all over Pakistan and helps in emergencies and efforts after disasters.

== Heatwave in Karachi ==
Dead bodies that cannot be spaced in other hospitals/cold-storage houses for hygienic storage due to the 2015 Pakistani heat wave emergency situation, JDC established a temporary cold storage at Numaish Chowrangi until arrangements for burial were made. The increase in sudden deaths the metropolitan Karachi faced led to the scarcity of gravesites for the burial of the dead. Thus JDC Foundation decided to help with cash for burial arrangements to overcome the in Karachi’s graveyards and funeral on time.

== Wall of Kindness ==
In Pakistan, JDC 2016 introduced the concept of “Diwar-e-Mehrbani” (Wall of Kindness) and “Bazaar-e-Mehrbani” (Market of Kindness), which was conducted at Expo Centre Karachi. Under the Wall of Kindness initiative, new and usable cloths are hung on the wall at a selected place to carry away and use of needy people.

== Flood relief ==
JDC took part in the flood relief campaign across Pakistan when the rural areas of Sindh, Baluchistan, and KPK were affected by floods in September 2022.
