= 2019 heat wave =

The 2019 heat wave may refer to:

- May-June 2019 heat wave in India and Pakistan
- June-July 2019 European heat waves

== See also ==
- List of heat waves § 2019
