= Severe Tropical Storm Chanthu (2016) =

Pacific severe tropical storm in 2016

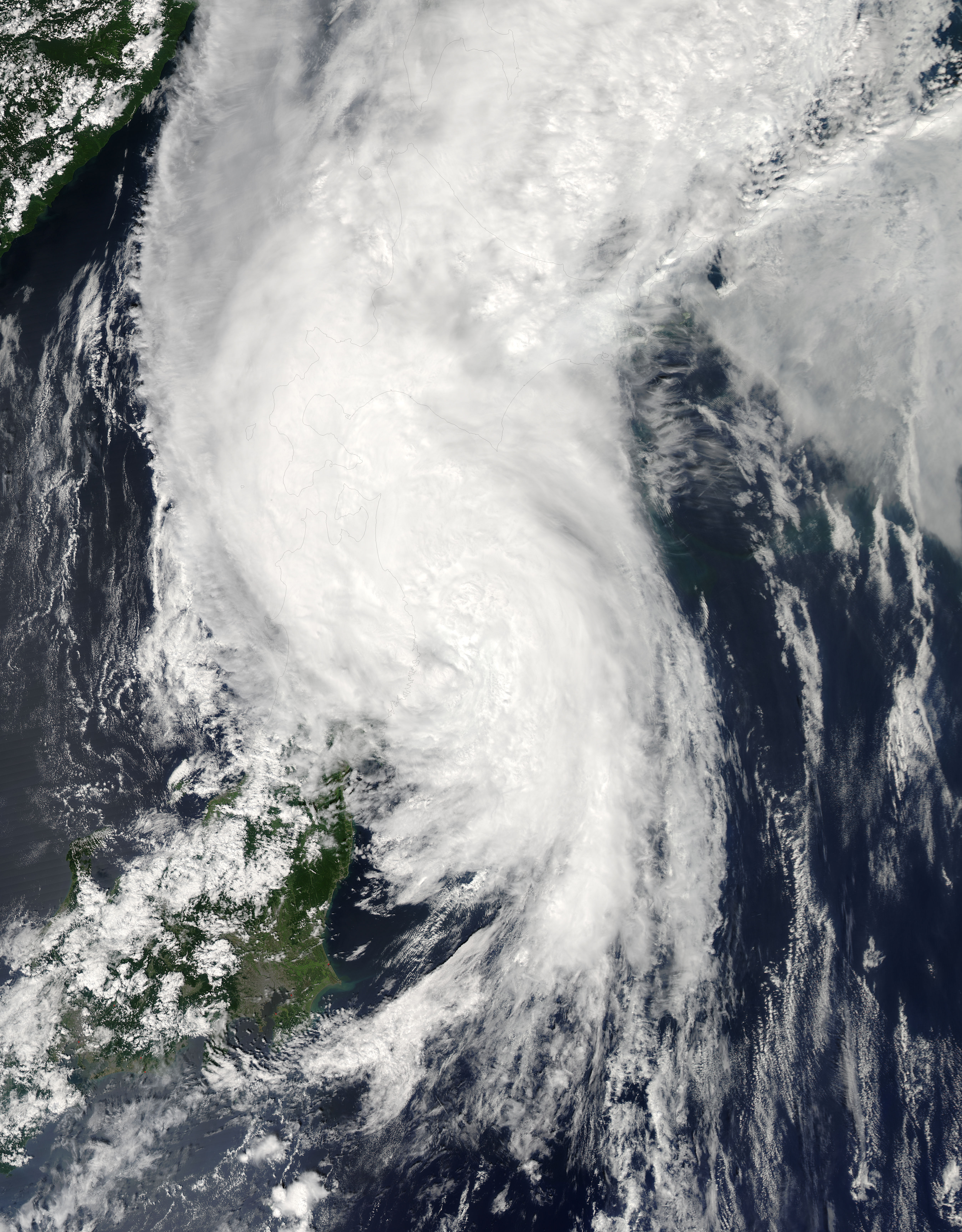
- Chanthu at peak intensity over Japan on August 17

Meteorological history
- Formed: August 12, 2016
- Extratropical: August 17, 2016
- Dissipated: August 18, 2016

Severe tropical storm
- 10-minute sustained (JMA)
- Highest winds: 100 km/h (65 mph)
- Lowest pressure: 980 hPa (mbar); 28.94 inHg

Tropical storm
- 1-minute sustained (SSHWS/JTWC)
- Highest winds: 85 km/h (50 mph)
- Lowest pressure: 978 hPa (mbar); 28.88 inHg

Overall effects
- Fatalities: None
- Damage: $97.4 million (2016 USD)
- Areas affected: Japan, Russian Far East
- Part of the 2016 Pacific typhoon season

Severe Tropical Storm Chanthu was a moderately strong tropical cyclone that affected Japan and the Russian Far East during August 2016. the seventh named storm of the annual typhoon season

== Meteorological history ==
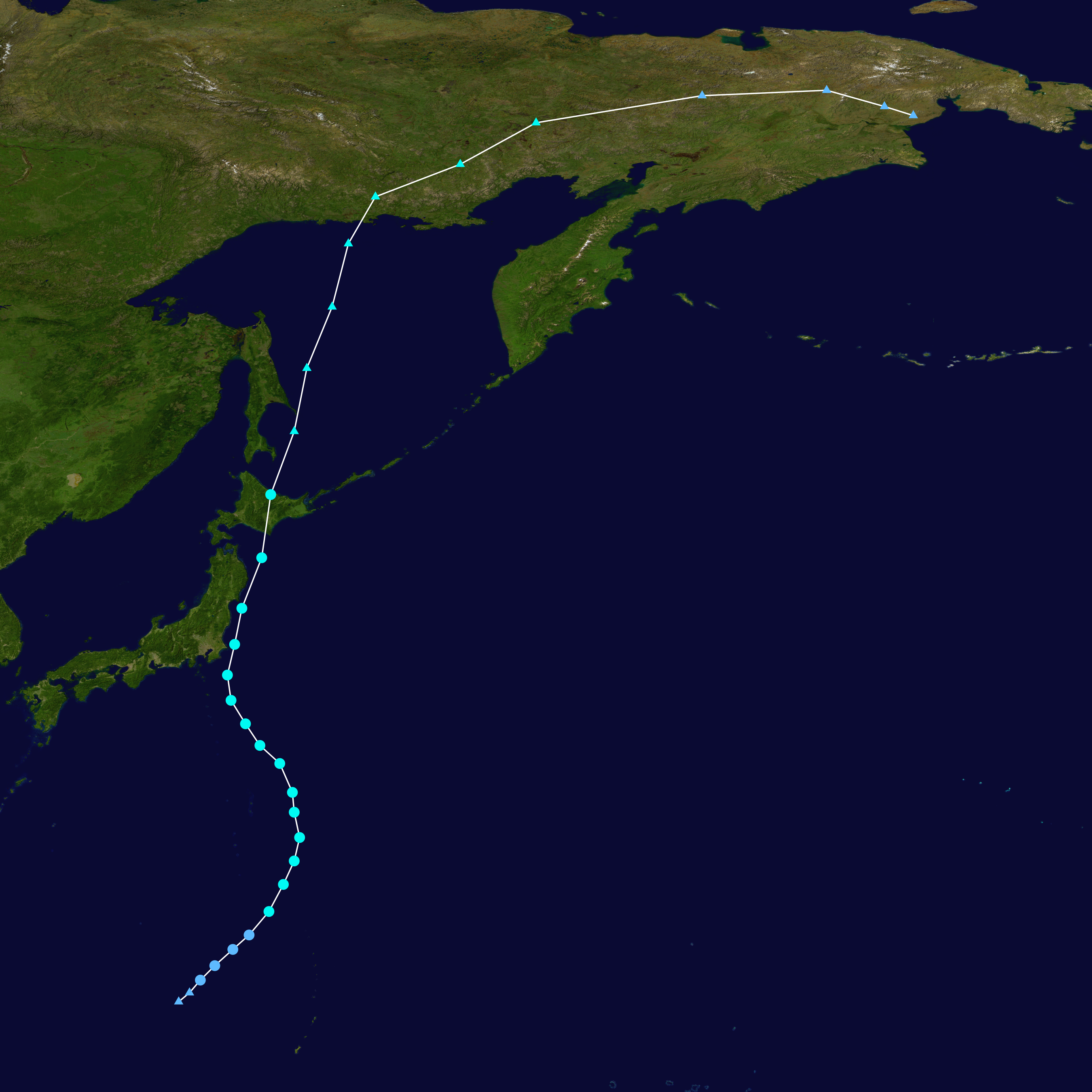
Map plotting the storm's track and intensity, according to the Saffir–Simpson scale Map key Saffir–Simpson scale Tropical depression (≤38 mph, ≤62 km/h) Tropical storm (39–73 mph, 63–118 km/h) Category 1 (74–95 mph, 119–153 km/h) Category 2 (96–110 mph, 154–177 km/h) Category 3 (111–129 mph, 178–208 km/h) Category 4 (130–156 mph, 209–251 km/h) Category 5 (≥157 mph, ≥252 km/h) Unknown Storm type Tropical cyclone Subtropical cyclone Extratropical cyclone, remnant low, tropical disturbance, or monsoon depression

On August 11, the JMA began tracking a tropical depressionwhereas the JTWC issued a Tropical Cyclone Formation Alert, as it was located about 695 km (432 mi) west-northwest of Guam. After meandering eastwards, the JTWC designated the system as 09W, while the JMA immediately upgraded 09W to a tropical storm and assigned it the name Chanthu on August 13.The JTWC followed suit early on August 14, With an improving LLCC, Chanthu rapidly developed into a severe tropical storm from the JMA, as it was later located over in an area of favorable environments of strengthening. Despite a high chance of strengthening and a well-defined LLCC, Chanthu stopped generating convection as the JMA downgraded it to a tropical storm.

Later that day, flaring convection was associated with its LLCC as it was beginning its extratropical transition while interacting with mid-latitude flow. Therefore, early on August 17, Chanthu restrengthened into a severe tropical storm strength as it attained its peak intensity with a minimal pressure of 980 millibars (28.94 inHg), while east of the Japanese archipelago of Honshu. Shortly thereafter, the JTWC issued its final warning on Chanthu. The JMA issued its final warning a few hours later as it made landfall over Cape Erimo of Hokkaido, Japan, at peak intensity. Its extratropical remnants were traceable for a few more days before being last noted over the Russian Far East on August 20

== Preparations and impact ==
Tropical Storm Chanthu brought heavy rainfall and gusty winds, disrupting traffic in extensive areas. An estimate of 1,500 homes in Ibaraki prefecture which was situated north of Chiba, lost power until morning. TEPCO reported that Chanthu has also moved over the Fukushima Daichi Nuclear Power Plant, but nothing unusual was reported and activity remains the same, WestPacWx reported. Many people in areas facing fears of mudslides and other dangers were ordered or advised to evacuate, including about 2,700 households in Otsuchi, Iwate Prefecture, and about 3,800 households in the city of Hakodate in Hokkaido.

== See also ==
- Weather of 2016
- Tropical cyclones in 2016
