= 2024 Pakistan heat wave =

2024 extreme weather event in Sindh

- Heat event
- Max temp: 49 °C (120 °F), recorded on 25 June 2024

Overall effects
- Casualties: 7,905+ hospitalizations
- Fatalities: 568+
- Areas affected: Sindh

The 2024 Pakistan heat wave was an extreme heat event occurring in June 2024 that led to the death of over 568 Pakistani citizens primarily in Southern Pakistan.

== Background ==
The Pakistan Meteorological Department reported severe heatwave conditions occurring on 21–31 May 2024 through most of the country, and primarily in Sindh. Temperature highs rose to 40–42 °C (104–108 °F) in Karachi and 42–44 °C (108–111 °F) in Thatta, Badin and Sujawal districts, causing 2,547 reported instances of heat stroke and 133 livestock deaths.

The International Rescue Committee (IRC) warned that heat waves would exacerbate the consequences of flood and drought, causing food insecurity for over 8.6 million people in up to 26 of Pakistan's 166 districts, and demanded that the world pay attention to the ongoing climate crisis.

Starting on 20 June 2024, temperatures in Sindh began to rise due to a prolonged heat wave, with temperatures in Karachi rising above 40 °C (104 °F) throughout the weekend and reaching 47.2 °C (117.0 °F) on 25 June. The heat was coupled with high humidity, causing the temperature to feel the same as 49 °C (120 °F). Extreme temperatures were made more difficult to bear due to regular power cuts that cut off air conditioning and fans in many regions. Heat wave camps were set up in order to alleviate injuries and deaths from the heatwave.

== Casualties ==
From 20 to 26 June 2024, 568 deaths were reported as a result of extreme temperatures, 141 of whom died on 25 June alone. The Edhi ambulance service reported that it was taking roughly 30-40 people to the Karachi morgue daily. Several of the deceased in Karachi were homeless or suspected drug addicts who showed no signs of prior injury.

At least 427 people died in Karachi, with the four morgues in the city reporting that there was no more space to keep bodies due to their rapid influx. Civil Hospital Karachi reported that 267 people were taken in due to heat stroke between 23 and 26 June, of whom twelve died as a result. Head of the emergency department Dr. Imran Sarwar Sheikh reported that most of the casualties were reported to be in their 60s-70s, with some in their 20s. He stated that several of the patients were working outside.

According to the Government of Pakistan, at least 5,358 patients were admitted to hospitals for heat-related illnesses, and 158 livestock were killed.

== See also ==
- 2017 Pakistan heat wave
- 2015 Pakistan heat wave
- List of extreme weather records in Pakistan
