= 2017 Pakistan heat wave =

Meteorological history
- Date: April 2017
- Heat event
- A map marking significantly affected cities
- Max temp: 51 °C (124 °F), recorded at Larkana on 20 April

Overall effects
- Fatalities: At least 4 as of 5 May 2017

In April 2017, a severe heat wave with temperatures as high as 51 °C (124 °F) hit Pakistan, especially its southern parts. This heat wave broke the old temperature records of many cities in the country for the month of April. Larkana, a city in the southern province of Sindh, experienced the highest maximum temperature of 51.0 °C on 20 April, breaking the previous day's record of 50 °C.

== Affected areas ==
In late March 2017, a heatwave engulfed most parts of the Sindh province as Nawabshah and Larkana registered 43 °C.

The severe heat wave turned April 2017 as the hottest April passed during the last two decades. On 17 April, Sukkur recorded 47 °C breaking its earlier record of 46.5 °C on 25 April 2000. The temperature in Multan reached 45.1 °C which broke its previous record during the month of April of 44.7 °C recorded on 19 April 2010. Similarly, Khanpur leveled its previous maximum temperature of 46.5 °C recorded on 27 April 1993. In Faisalabad, maximum temperature reached 44.5 °C compared to its previous maximum temperature of 44 °C recorded on 29 April 2007.

On 19 April, four Pakistani cities witnessed the hottest days of their history in the month of April, including Larkana (50 °C), Moenjo Daro (49 °C), Sibi (49 °C) and Lahore (45 °C). Previously, the maximum temperature recorded in Lahore during April was 44 °C on 18 April 2010. On 20 April, Larkana recorded 51 °C as maximum temperature, while the meteorological office at Moenjodaro Airport recorded the temperature at 50 °C. On 21–22 April, dust storms and light rain over upper parts of the country and in north-east Punjab broke the heat spell but damaged wheat and other crops.

However, most parts of Sindh continued to experience an early summer. On 1 May, Nawabshah and Mithi recorded the maximum temperature of 44.5 °C. On 5 May, the heat wave claimed four lives in Hyderabad which recorded temperature at 45 °C.

== Recorded temperatures ==
Extreme temperatures started to affect parts of the country from mid-April and peaked on 19–20 April.

Place	Temperature	Date
Larkana	51.0 °C (123.8 °F)	20 April
Sukkur	47.0 °C (116.6 °F)	17 April
Moenjo Daro	50.0 °C (122.0 °F)	20 April
Karachi	41.5 °C (106.7 °F)	30 April
Lahore	45.0 °C (113.0 °F)	19 April
Nawabshah	44.5 °C (112.1 °F)	1 May
Multan	45.1 °C (113.2 °F)	17 April
Sibi	49.0 °C (120.2 °F)	19 April
Rahimyar Khan	47.0 °C (116.6 °F)	17 April
Khanpur	46.5 °C (115.7 °F)	17 April

== See also ==
- 2015 Pakistan heat wave
- 2024 Pakistan heat wave
