= Weather of 2016 =

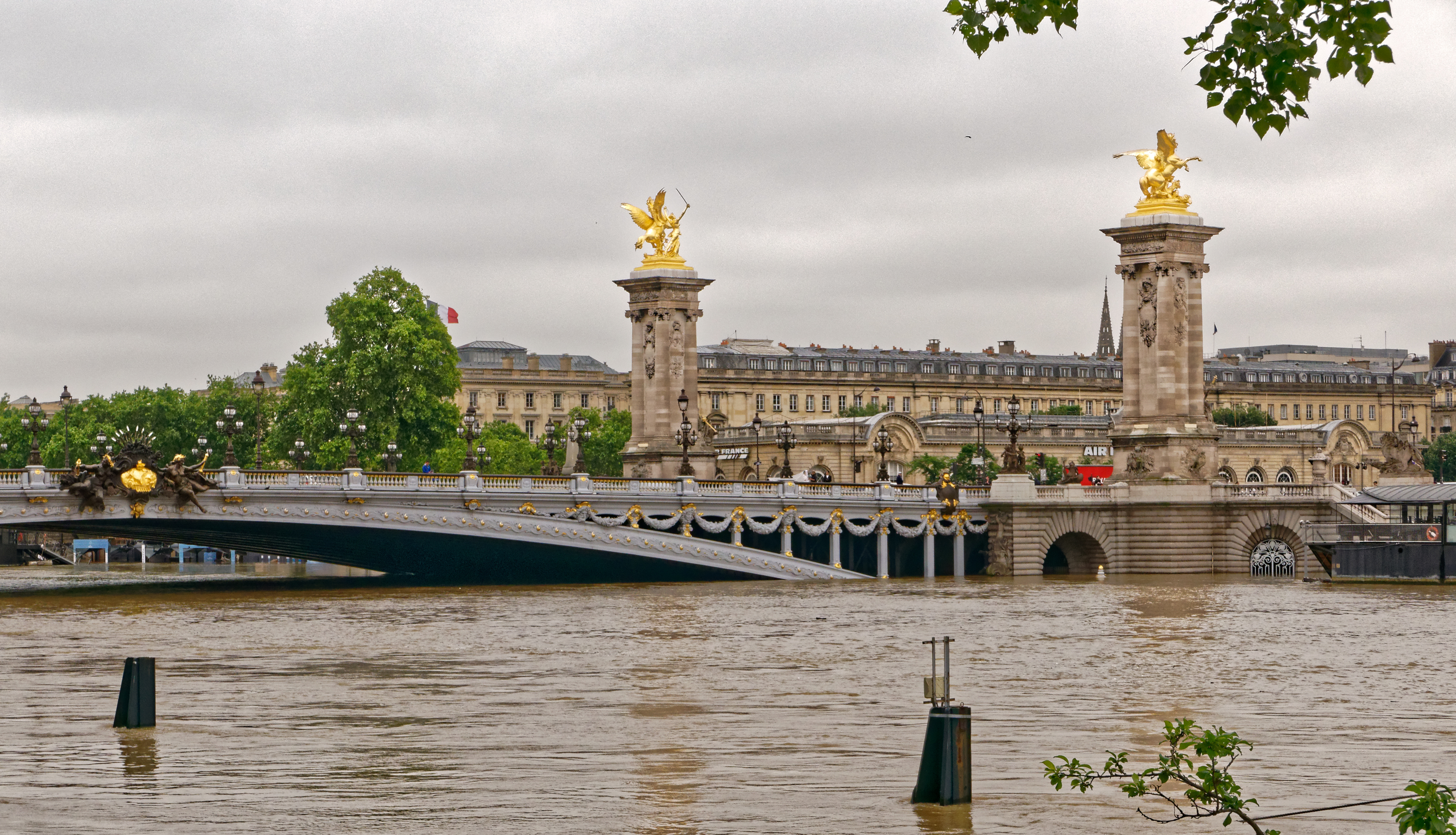
The Seine in Paris, France amid floods across Europe in June and July 2016

The following is a list of weather events that occurred in 2016.

== Summary by weather type ==
=== Winter storms and cold waves ===
A crippling and historic blizzard, sometimes referred to as Snowzilla, affected the Mid-Atlantic region of the United States. It originated from a low pressure system developing in the Southeast on January 22 and rapidly intensified as it moved along the Mid-Atlantic on January 23. Blizzard conditions were noted in New York City, Long Island, northeast New Jersey, and southwest Connecticut. Central Park saw 27.5 in (70 cm) of snow, the largest snowstorm to hit New York City since record began in 1869. At Reagan National Airport, 17.8 in (45 cm) of snow was measured, while Dulles International Airport measured 29.3 in (74 cm), the second largest on record.

=== Droughts, heat waves, and wildfires ===
In April and May, a powerful heat wave struck most of India, with the highest temperature being recorded at 51.0 °C (123.8 °F) in Phalodi, Rajasthan. In June, record heat hit many parts of the Southwestern United States, with Burbank, California hitting a record 109 °F (42.8 °C), while Phoenix, Arizona recorded 118 °F (48 °C).

=== Tornadoes ===
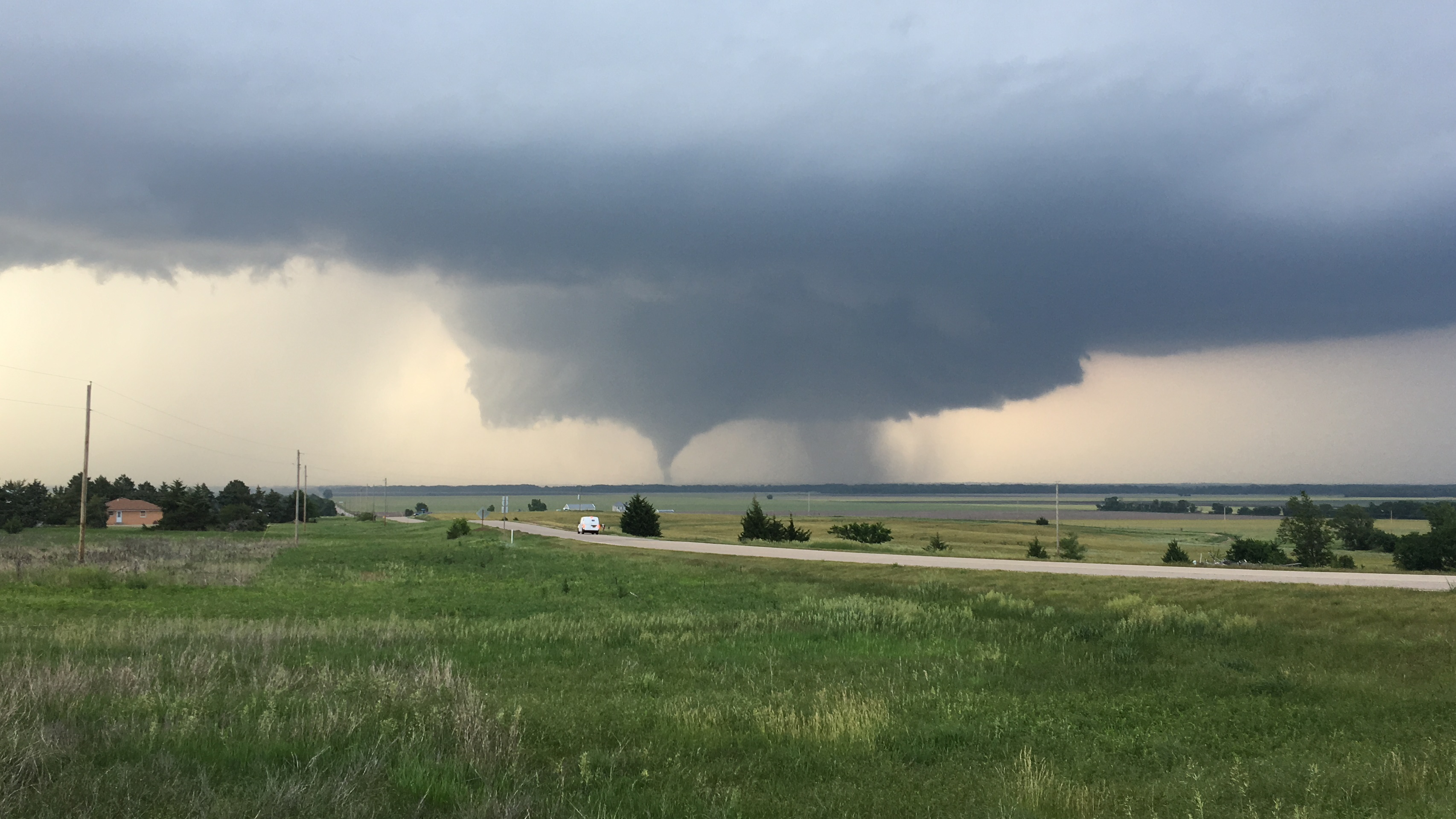
The EF4 Abilene–Chapman, Kansas tornado on May 25.

A small tornado outbreak occurred during a winter storm on February 2-3. An EF1 due to the outbreak caused $5.08 million. Three weeks later, the second largest tornado outbreak in February resulted in 7 deaths. The tornado outbreak caused $1.2 billion in damage.

=== Tropical cyclones ===
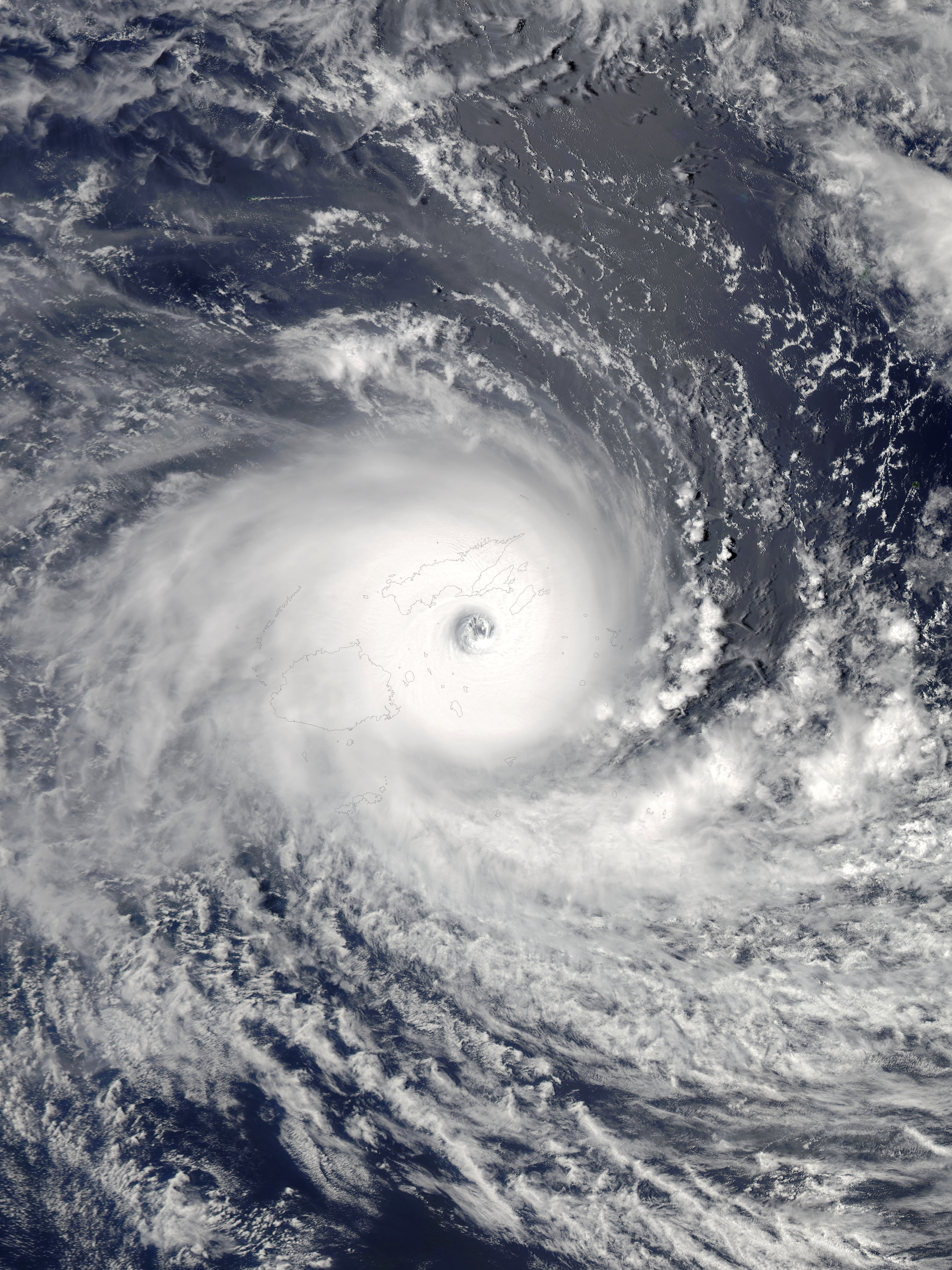
Cyclone Winston at peak intensity just before landfall in Fiji on February 20

As the year began, a tropical low was over Australia, and Cyclone Ula was moving toward Tonga. Ula was followed by another 16 tropical cyclones, including Cyclone Winston, which was the most intense tropical cyclone in the Southern Hemisphere on record, with 10 minute sustained winds of 280 km/h (175 mph), and a minimum pressure of 884 mbar (26.1 inHg). At peak intensity, Winston made landfall on Fiji, the strongest ever to hit the country, and one of the strongest landfalls worldwide on record. Damage in Fiji totaled FJ$2.98 billion (US$1.4 billion), and 44 people were killed. In the Australian basin, there were 16 tropical cyclones, which made it the least-active season on record. Activity in the south-west Indian Ocean was also below average, with just tropical cyclones. Among these were Cyclone Fantala in April, which reached 10 minute sustained winds of 250 km/h (155 mph) while near the Seychelles, making it the strongest tropical cyclone on record in the basin.

The first northern hemisphere tropical cyclone was Hurricane Pali, a rare off-season hurricane which formed on January 7 southwest of Hawaii. There were an additional 22 tropical cyclones in the north-east Pacific Ocean during the year, including Hurricane Otto, which crossed from the Caribbean Sea in November, killing 23 people in Central America. Otto was the last of 16 tropical cyclones in the Atlantic Ocean. The first, Alex, was a rare January hurricane which hit the Azores. The strongest Atlantic hurricane of the year was Matthew, which attained 1 minute sustained winds of 165 mph (270 km/h) in the Caribbean. Matthew killed 603 people and left at least US$15 billion in damage after its path through Haiti, Cuba, The Bahamas, and offshore the southeastern United States. In August, Hurricane Earl killed 81 people in southeast Mexico after it struck Belize. In September, Hurricane Hermine made landfall just east of St. Marks, Florida as a Category 1 hurricane, with winds of 80 mph (130 km/h), making it the first hurricane to hit Florida since Hurricane Wilma in 2005.

In the north Indian Ocean, there were ten tropical cyclones. Among these were Cyclone Roanu in May, which killed 135 people in Sri Lanka and Bangladesh, causing over US$2 billion in damage. In contrast to the unusually early start to activity in the north-east Pacific and the Atlantic, the first tropical cyclone in the north-west Pacific did not develop until May 25, when a tropical depression formed. It was the first of 51 tropical cyclones during the year. The strongest of the year was Typhoon Meranti, which reached 10 minute sustained winds of 220 km/h (140 mph) while moving through the Batanes in the Philippines. Meranti later struck China, and along its path it killed 47 people, with US$4.79 billion in damage. In July, Typhoon Nepartak killed 111 people and left US$1.89 billion in damage when it struck Taiwan and southeastern China. In August, Typhoon Lionrock became the first storm on record to strike the Tōhoku region of Japan, with 22 deaths in the country and 525 deaths from flooding in North Korea.

== Timeline ==
This is a timeline of weather events during 2016. Please note that entries might cross between months, however, all entries are listed by the month they started.

=== January ===
- January 12–17 - Hurricane Alex kills one person, and becomes the first Hurricane in January in the Atlantic since 1938.
- January 21–29 - A historical blizzard, the most recent to be rated a category 5 on the regional snowfall index scale, causes 55 deaths and between $500 million and $3 billion in damage.

=== February ===
- A tornado outbreak consisting of 61 tornadoes, the second largest on record for February, caused 7 deaths and $1.2 billion.

=== May ===
- May 1 – 2016 Fort McMurray wildfire: a wildfire erupts after record high temperatures in April in northern Alberta, forcing the evacuation of the entire city of Fort McMurray in Alberta. It is the largest mass evacuation in Canadian history. The wildfire destroys more than 3000 buildings, burns nearly 600,000 hectares of land, and causes nearly $10 billion in damages. The wildfire is the costliest natural disaster in Canadians history.
- May 7–10 - A tornado outbreak of 57 tornadoes caused 2 deaths, 19 injuries and $1 billion in damage.
- May 15 – A nighttime EF2 tornado in Brazil killed four people and injured 21 others.
- May 22–26 - A tornado outbreak sequence spawns 98 tornadoes, which caused 11 injuries and $1.3 billion in damage.

=== June ===
- June 23 - The Jiangsu tornado in China caused 98 deaths and 846 injuries, amounting to $760 million in damage. The tornado was rated EF4. Another unrated tornado caused an additional fatality.

=== September ===
- September 9 - Philadelphia, for the first time in history, has a low above 80 °F (27 °C) in September. The high that day also set a record at 96 °F (36 °C).
- September 28 – October 10 - Hurricane Matthew unleashes catastrophic damage across the Caribbean (especially in Haiti), and the Southeastern United States, causing 603 deaths and $16.47 billion in damage.

=== November ===
- November 20–26 – Hurricane Otto killed 23 people and caused $192.2 million (2016 US$) in damage across Panama, Costa Rica and Nicaragua. Hurricane Otto was also the first hurricane since 1996 to survive the crossover from the Atlantic Ocean to the Pacific Ocean.
- November 27–30 - A tornado outbreak that unleashes 48 tornadoes caused 6 deaths and 55 injuries. It also caused at least $3.7 million in damage according to NOAA, and $275 million according to Aon.

=== December ===
- December 13 – A man in Florida was struck and killed by lightning. This was the first person to die due to lightning in December since 1998.

Global weather by year
Preceded by 2015	Weather of 2016	Succeeded by 2017
