= 2016 Abilene–Chapman tornado =

2016 EF4 tornado in Kansas, US

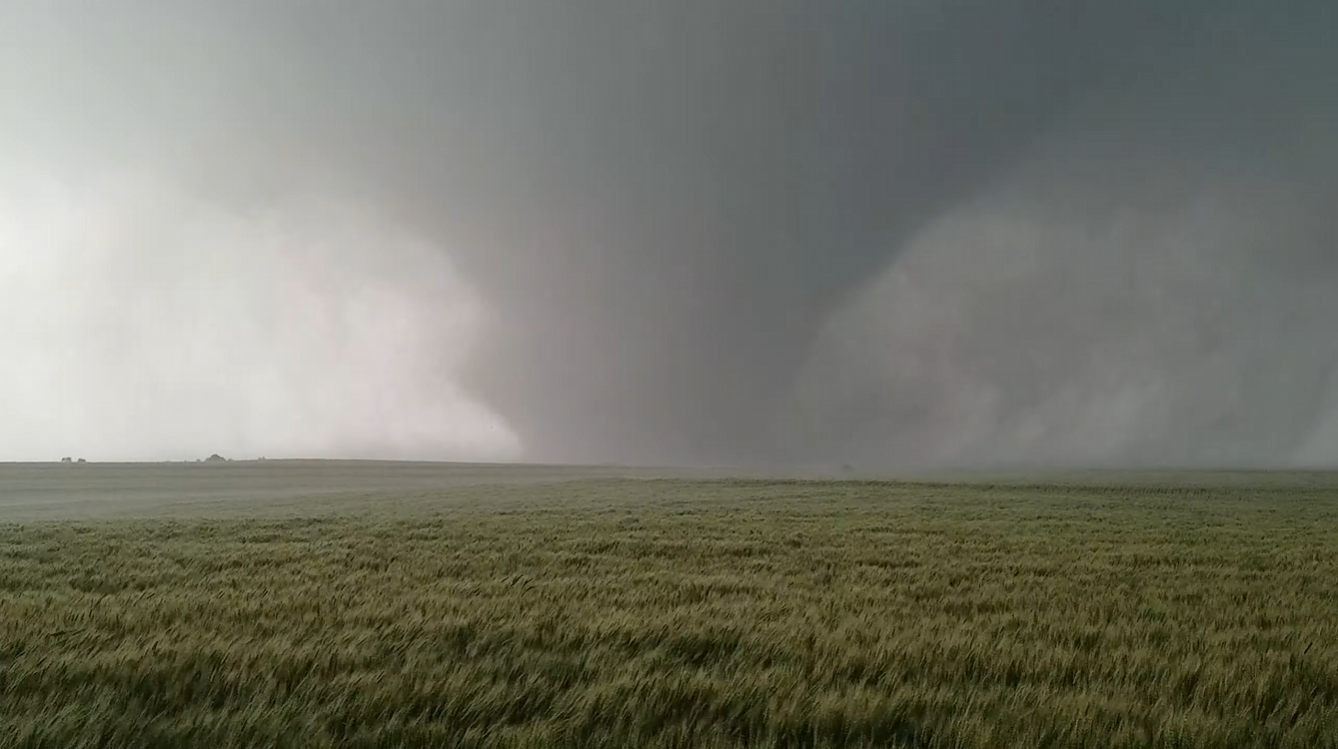
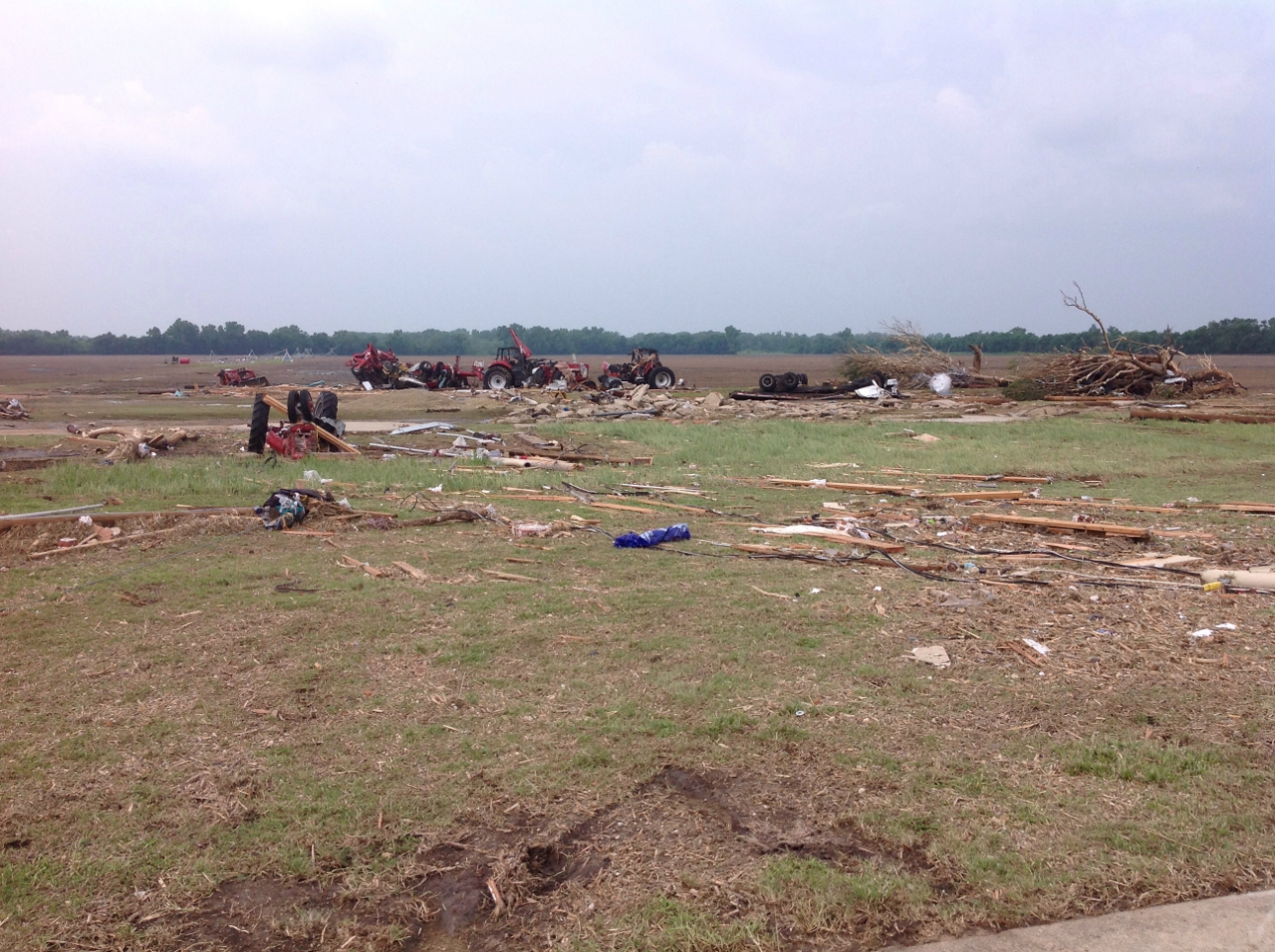
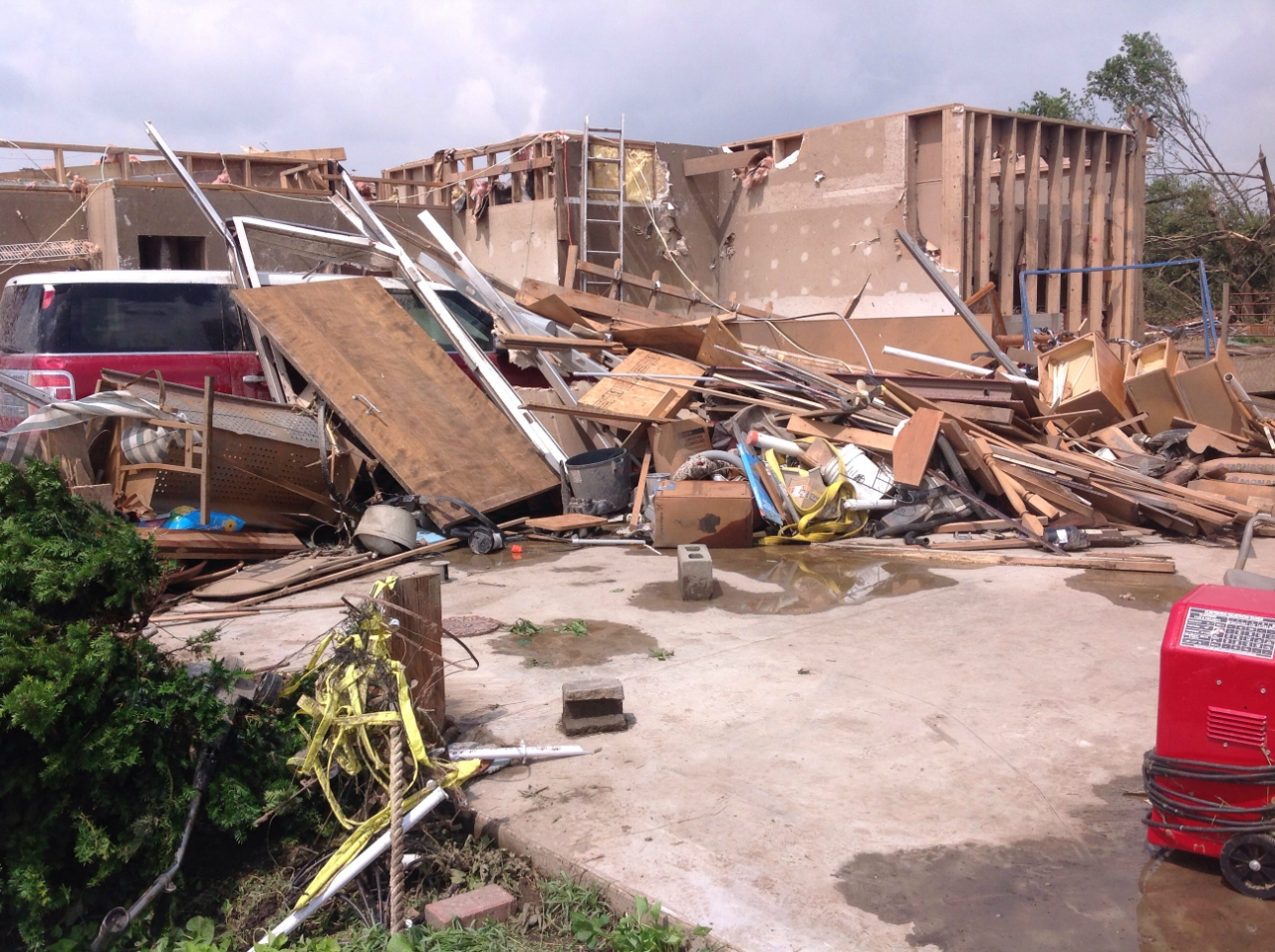
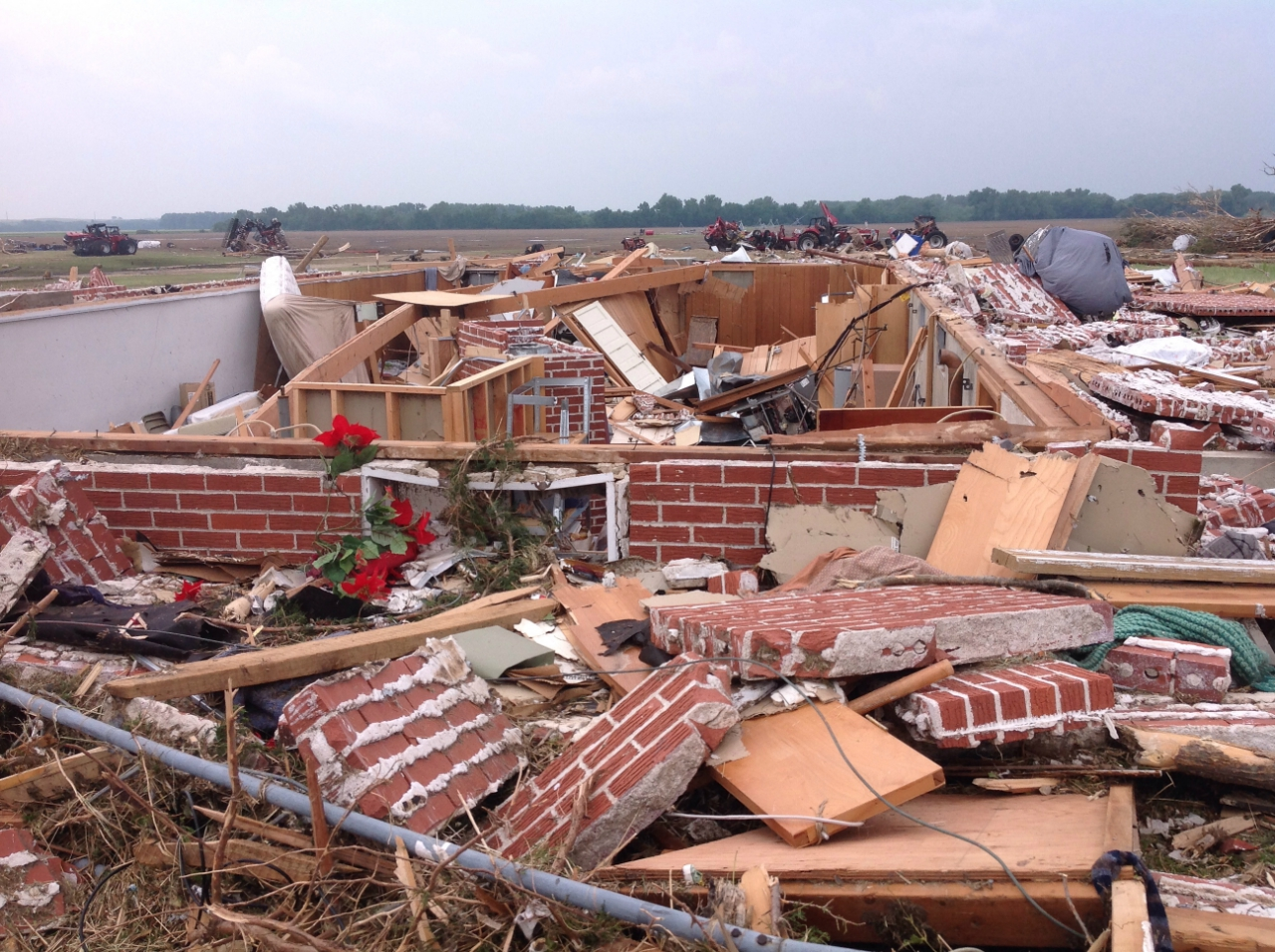
- Clockwise from the top: shot of the tornado in rural Dickinson County, farm machinery hurled around and mangled, EF4 damage to a well-constructed brick farmhouse near Chapman, a home near Solomon impacted at EF3 intensity, Next-Generation Radar loop of the long-lived supercell.

Meteorological history
- Formed: May 25, 2016; 7:07 p.m. CDT (UTC−05:00)
- Dissipated: May 25, 2016; 8:40 p.m. CDT (UTC−05:00)
- Duration: 1 hour, 33 minutes

EF4 tornado
- on the Enhanced Fujita scale
- Max width: 900 yards (0.51 mi; 0.82 km)
- Path length: 25.09 miles (40.38 km)
- Highest winds: 180 mph (290 km/h)

Overall effects
- Fatalities: 0
- Injuries: 8
- Areas affected: Ottawa and Dickinson counties; specifically near Solomon, Abilene and Chapman, Kansas, United States
- Part of the Tornado outbreak sequence of May 22–26, 2016 and Tornadoes of 2016

Throughout the evening of May 25, 2016, a long-lived and powerful EF4 tornado tore across parts of rural central to northeastern Kansas in the United States, within Ottawa and Dickinson Counties. The tornado was the strongest during a major tornado outbreak sequence that lasted from May 22–26, and was the second violent tornado to occur during the 2016 season. In its wake, the tornado passed by the cities of Solomon, Abilene and Chapman, damaging or destroying many rural structures and farmsteads. Chapman in particular avoided a direct impact by the tornado, which already saw a direct hit by a deadly EF3 tornado back in June of 2008.

The tornado lasted for 93 minutes, traveled for 25.09 miles (40.38 km) and was 900 yards (0.51 mi; 0.82 km) across in width. National Weather Service damage surveyors from the Topeka, Kansas, weather forecasting office, estimated winds of 180 mph (290 km/h) based on the destruction of a rural residence near Chapman. However, surveyors noted that the house was found so violently destroyed, they speculated winds of around 200 mph (320 km/h) were likely, plausibly indicating EF5 intensity.

== Meteorological synopsis ==
=== Episode narrative ===
Storm Prediction Center outlooks on May 25, 2016

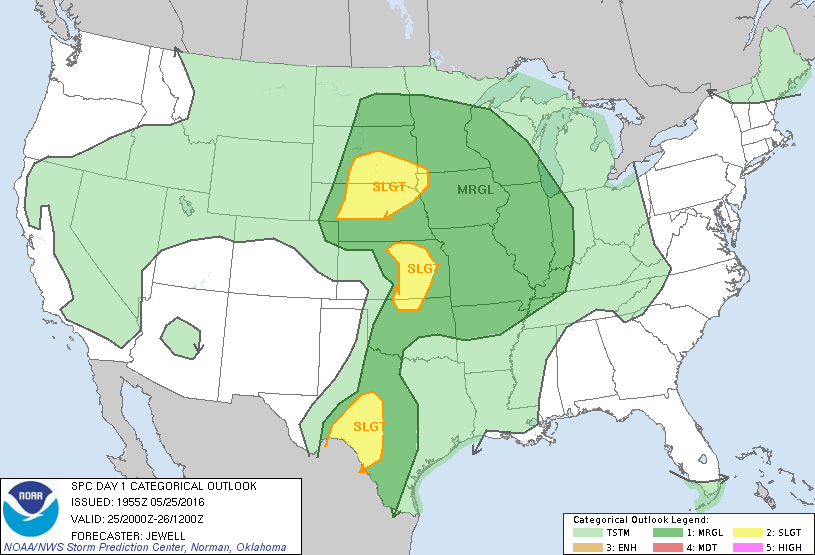
Day 1 20z categorical outlooks.

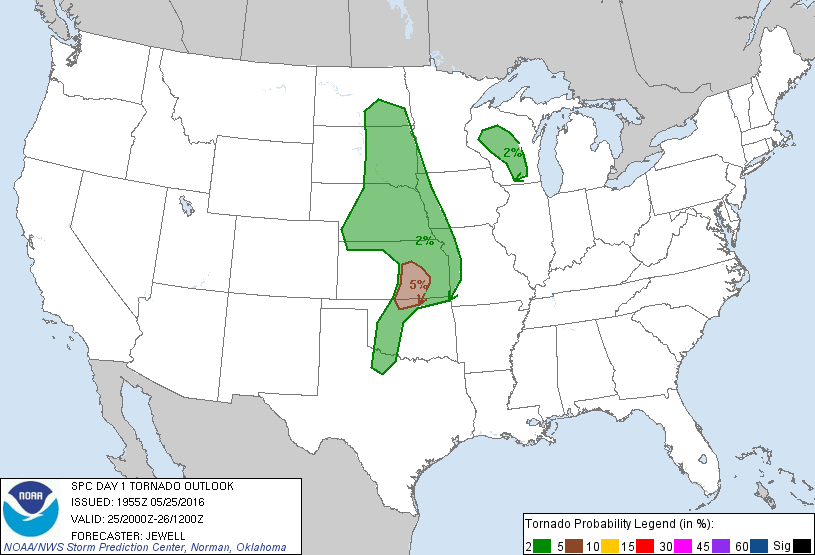
Day 1 20z tornado outlooks.

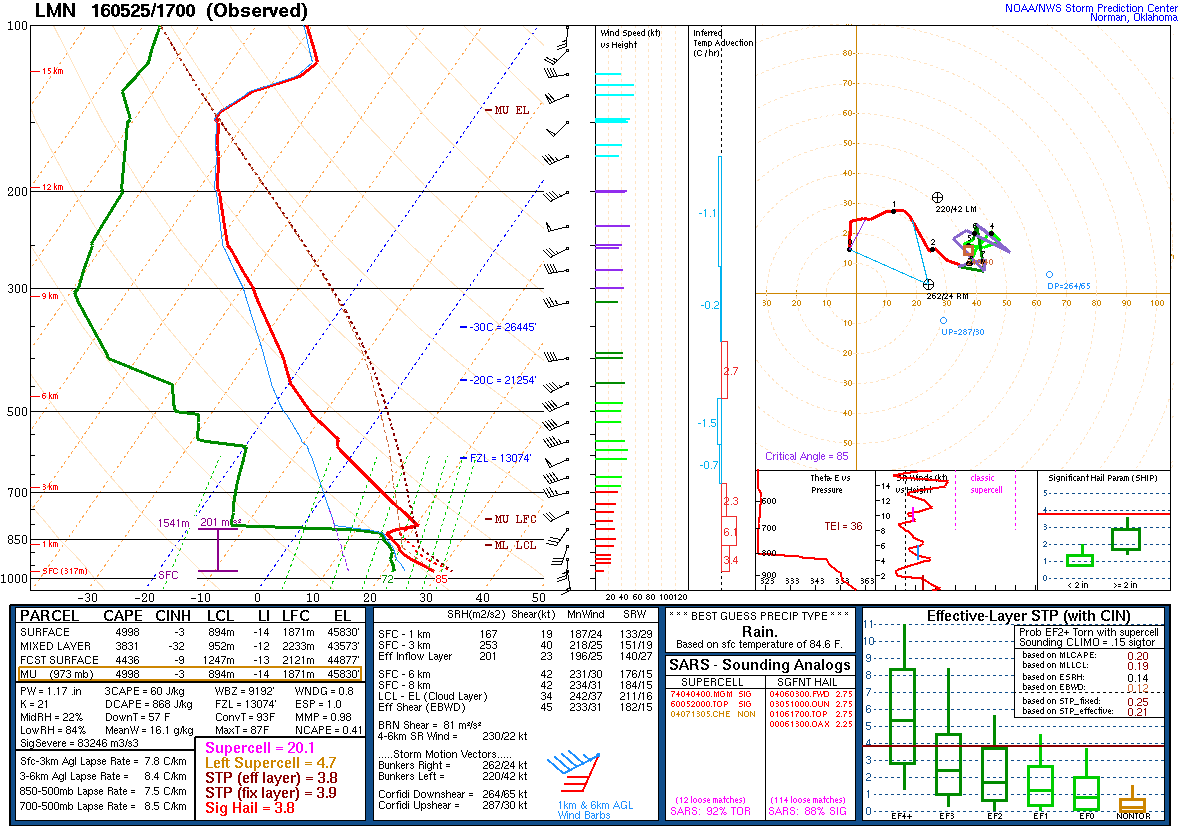
Atmospheric sounding recorded near the Kansas-Oklahoma border on May 25.

During the evening hours on May 24, at 8:00 p.m CDT (01:00 UTC), the Storm Prediction Center issued an enhanced risk for severe thunderstorms across portions of the Great Plains region of the United States. Two areas, from the Texas Panhandle to southwestern Kansas, and in northeastern Colorado to southwestern Nebraska were placed under this level 3/5 risk, citing that very large hail and a few tornadoes were expected to occur during the evening hours. A hatched 10% tornado risk was issued for the areas in Texas, Oklahoma, Kansas, Nebraska and Colorado. At the time the outlooks were issued, clusters of storms moved from the High Plains region down to northwestern Oklahoma and far northern Texas. Some of these storms were particularly intense supercells, which previously spawned numerous and widely documented tornadoes around Dodge City, Kansas. These storms across western Kansas, the Texas and Oklahoma panhandles initiated in the vicinity of a nearby dryline, with the supercells responsible for the Dodge City, Kansas tornadoes being near the intersection of the dryline and an outflow boundary initiated by earlier convection. Remnants of the system would travel to the east to Arkansas and western Tennessee. Southeasterly surface winds were present on the west side of the outflow boundary across Kansas, changing southwesterly in direction at 40 knots (kts) at mid-levels. This result was favorable for yielding wind shear, which gave way to strong low-level rotation and or tornadoes.

=== Event narrative ===
On May 25, at 11:30 a.m CDT (16:30 UTC), the Storm Prediction Center downgraded the categorical risk from an enhanced level 3/5, to a slight level 2/5 risk across southwestern Texas and eastern Kansas. A 2% tornado risk was in place spanning from northern Texas to southeastern North Dakota. Isolated, strong and severe thunderstorms, with damaging winds and hail were forecasted to be present in southwestern Texas. A broad, marginal risk expanded throughout most of portions of Tornado Alley. A low pressure system was present over central Kansas, with the accompanying dryline extending south into western Oklahoma and the Texas Panhandle. Low cloud cover eroded as time passed on, with low-level winds coming from the north transporting mid to upper level dew points within the 60° degree Fahrenheit (15.5° Celsius) range into the regional areas. During the mid to late afternoon hours, a very unstable air mass was expected to form with steep, mid level lapse rates giving way to high Mixed Layer Convective Available Potential Energy (MLCAPE) levels of over 3500 joules per kilogram (J/kg). A dryline bulge was forecasted to be on the southern side of the low pressure system, aiding the chances of thunderstorms firing during peak heating. Vertical shear profiling would assist in the formation of rotating supercell structure, damaging winds, hail and a possible tornado in Kansas. Later at 3:00 p.m CDT (20:00 UTC), the Storm Prediction issued a third slight risk area across Nebraska and South Dakota, and increased the tornado risk to 5% for eastern Kansas.

== Tornado summary ==
=== Beginning phase in Ottawa County ===
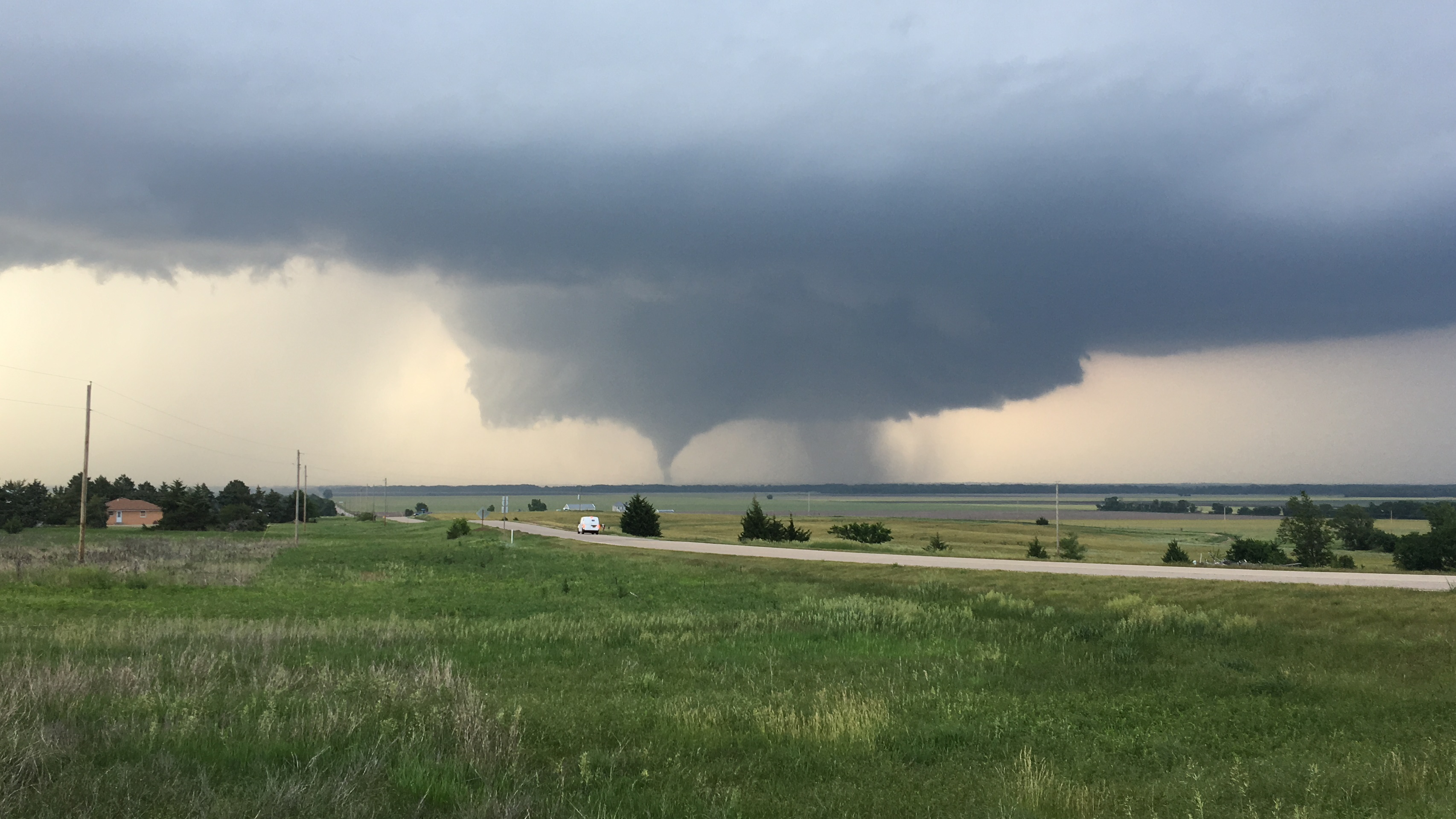
The EF4 tornado seen touching down near the Ottawa–Dickinson County border.

The tornado touched down to the northeast of Niles at 7:07 p.m. CDT (12:07 UTC), west of 270th Road at EF0 intensity in extreme southeastern Ottawa County. Upon crossing 270th and paralleling Buffalo Road, it strengthened to EF1 intensity as it traversed through fields, passing by some structures and residences. After crossing the intersection of Buffalo and North 290th Roads, the tornado began to intensify to EF2 intensity, before abruptly becoming intense as it crossed Buckeye Creek and impacting a home at EF3 intensity on Solomon Road, north of Solomon, injuring a man who took shelter. Nearby trees had their trunks snapped at EF2 intensity. Soon after causing its first instance of severe damage, the tornado would leave Ottawa County.

=== Entrance into Dickinson County ===
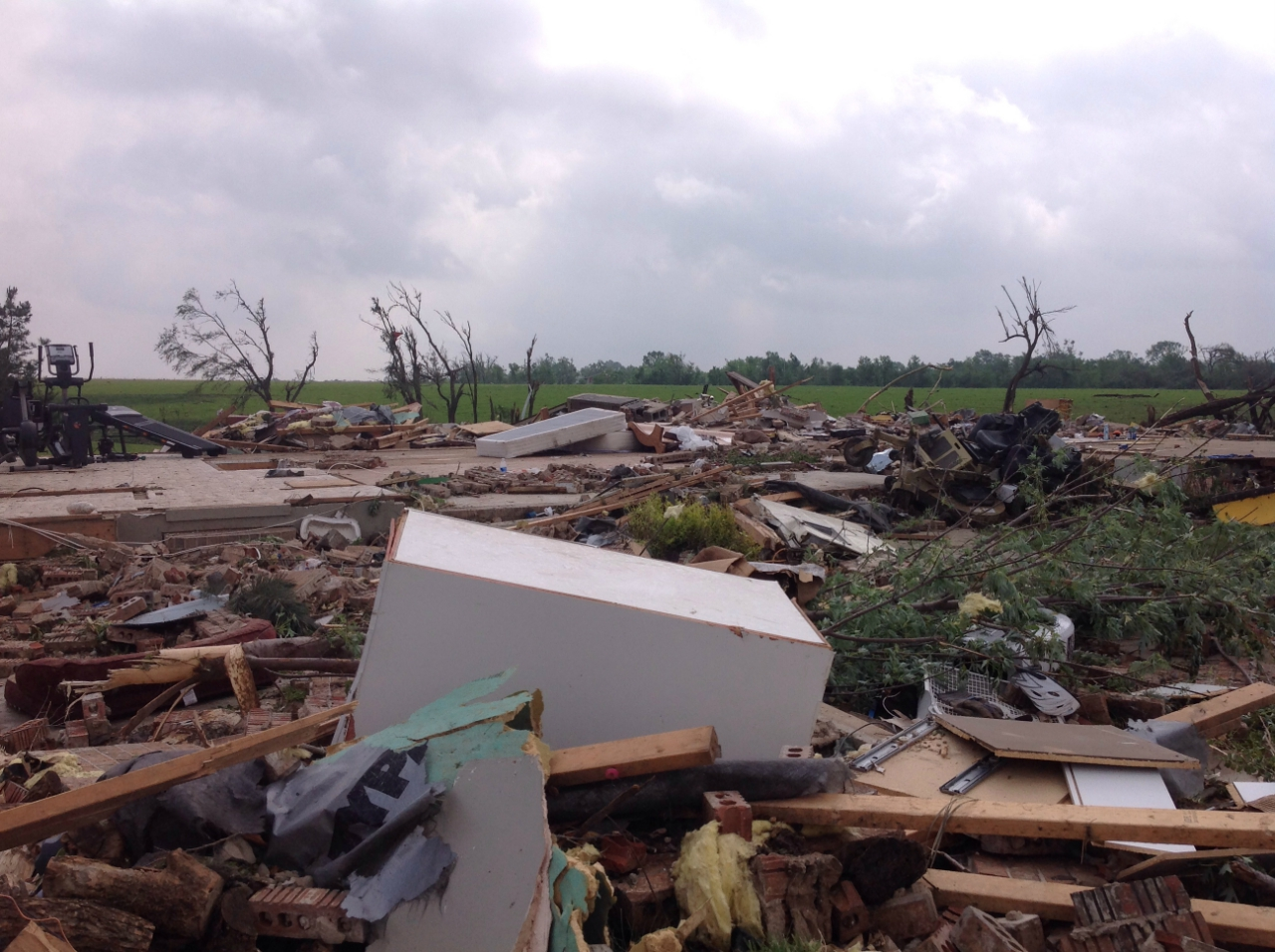
Residence north of Abilene swept away at EF3 intensity. A family sheltered in the basement.

After entering Dickinson County, the tornado would weaken to EF2 intensity, before weakening even further down to EF1 strength as it passed along with 2700 Avenue to the north. One home on Daisy Road suffered minor roof damage, and to the east on Deer Road EF1 damage continued, as tree trunks were snapped. Directly on 2700 Avenue or south of Talmage, the tornado regained significant intensity, impacting a house where large sections of the top floor, and some walls were removed or collapsed at EF2 intensity. Many other homes in the vicinity along this road were directly hit, before the tornado became severe again and destroyed a residence at EF3 intensity, collapsing exterior walls of the home to the north of the large city of Abilene. A neighboring home directly east was considerably damaged at EF2 intensity, before the tornado again intensified, but dramatically on Hawk Road. Here, the tornado would completely level one home at high-end EF3 intensity, with most of the debris swept off foundation. A family of three was taking shelter in the basement bathroom at the time the tornado was leveling their home away. Construction quality of the house suggested borderline low-end EF4 damage according to the National Weather Service survey. After destroying the residence, the tornado would turn more southeasterly as it also again weakened down from EF2 to EF1 intensity.

=== Near direct hit with Chapman and dissipation ===
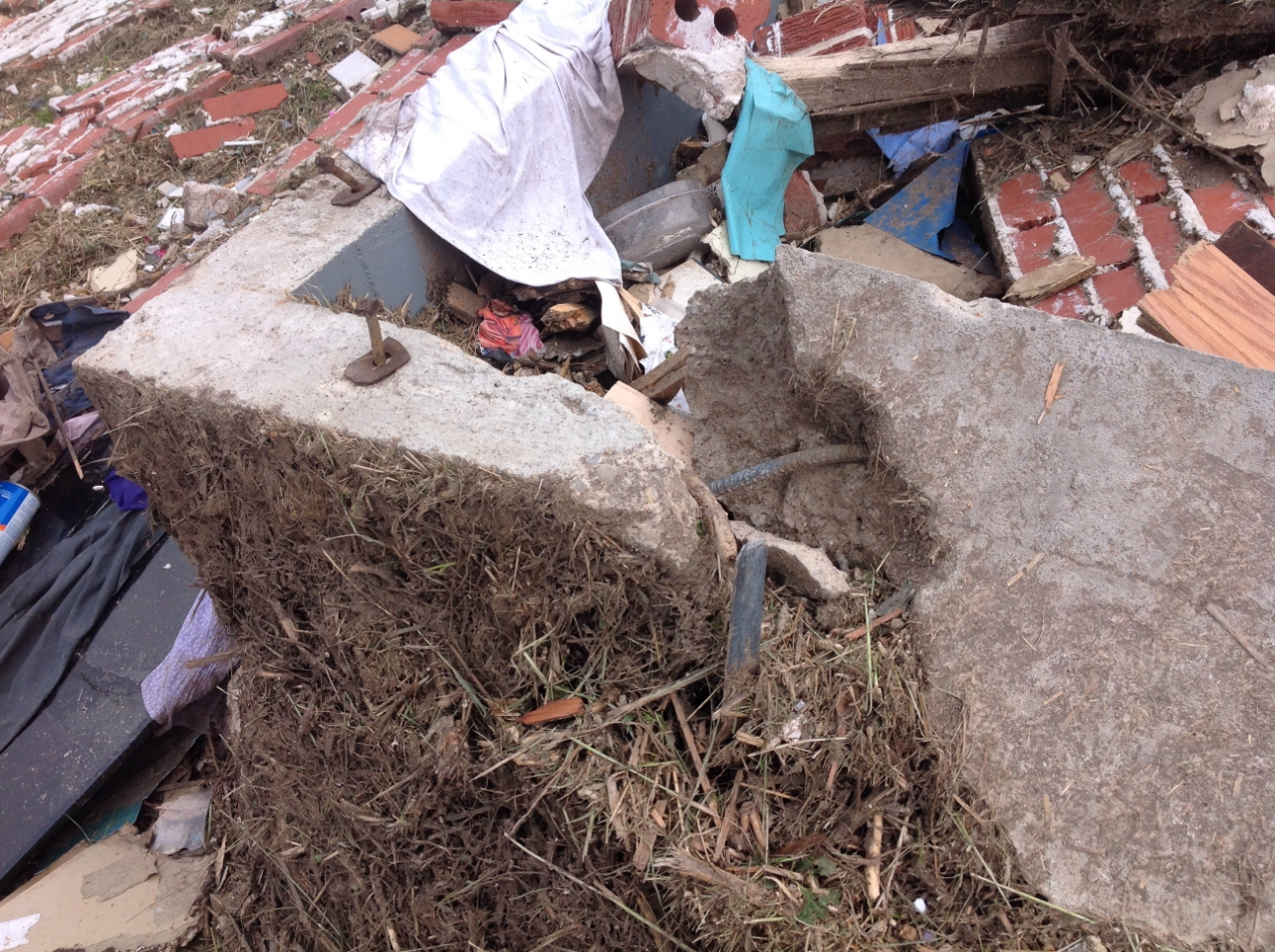
Concrete foundation of a farmhouse, supported with rebar cracked and sheared at EF4 intensity.

At 8:07 p.m. CDT (01:07 UTC), the National Weather Service issued a tornado warning for Moonlight and Chapman, citing an observed tornado was in progress. It meandered through fields, staying at EF1 intensity for the remainder of the time being. Upon its approach towards I-70, the tornado intensified again to EF2 intensity to the northeast of Detroit, snapping tree trunks along the freeway. At 8:18 p.m. CDT (1:18 UTC), the National Weather Service in Topeka issued a tornado emergency for northeastern Dickson County. Continuing southeast, the tornado impacted one property at EF3 intensity along Oat Road before approaching Old 40 Highway. Approximately 1 mile (1.6 km) southwest of Chapman along the highway, the tornado became extremely violent, damaging or destroying train tracks to severe levels, before impacting and leveling an entire farmstead at mid-range EF4 intensity. A woman took shelter in the basement of the farmhouse as the tornado passed over, surviving with superficial injuries, but had to be rescued out of the rubble. The tornado removed the subfloor of the home, which was bolted down to sill plates. The concrete foundation was also found cracked and sheared, which was supported with rebar. The tornado as well debarked trees, and hurled vehicles and farm machinery around, before mangling them to extreme levels. The tornado avoided a direct hit on Chapman, and continued its journey south of the small city. It would remain strong, causing EF2 damage to another farmstead, where a barn was obliterated and a farm home to its south on Quail Road. The tornado would strengthen for the last time, causing EF3 damage to a residence's roof, before weakening down to EF1 intensity. Along the Smoky Hill River, southeast of Chapman, the tornado would dissipate at 8:40 p.m. CDT (01:40 UTC).

== Aftermath ==
=== Statistics and prior tornado in 2008 ===
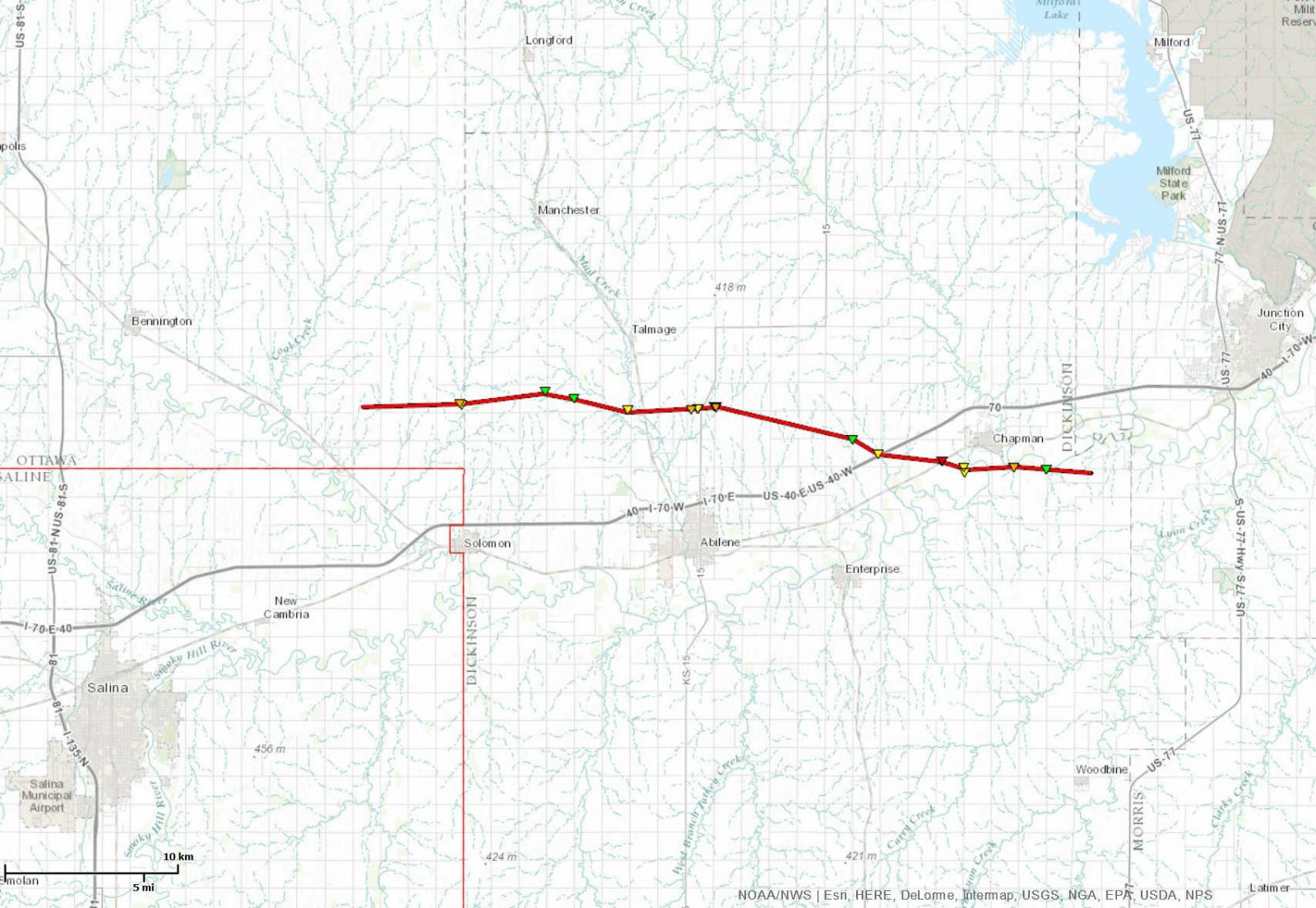
Track of the 2016 tornado across Ottawa and Dickinson counties. Parameters EF0 / 65–85 mph EF1 / 86–110 mph EF2 / 111–135 mph EF3 / 136–165 mph EF4 / 166–200 mph ⎯ Center of the tornado

The unusually long-lived tornado, was given a preliminary estimate of high-end EF3 with winds of 165 mph (266 km/h) by the National Weather Service office in Topeka the following day on May 26. The tornado then would be upgraded to upper-end EF4 in rating, with winds of 180 mph (290 km/h) later that day. The event lasted for 90 minutes, traveling along a path 26 mi (42 km) long, and 0.5 mi (0.80 km), whilst injuring a total of eight people. The tornado was the second violent tornado to occur through the 2016 season, with the other EF4 tornado occurring less than a month ago in Oklahoma. It was the strongest tornado to occur during an outbreak sequence in late May 2016, a rather inactive season when it came to the total tornado count. The 2016 EF4 tornado nearly became the second disaster to impact Chapman in almost eight years. Prior to that, the city was heavily destroyed by the 2008 EF3 tornado on June 11.

=== Recovery and efforts ===
The extremely violent tornado avoided impacting several population centers as it traversed primarily through rural Dickinson County, resulting in no fatalities. Kansas Highway Patrol reported that around 20 homes and farmsteads were damaged, six of them totally destroyed. Recovery after the tornado was fast, as residents across Dickinson County started cleaning up the day the tornado occurred, and the county opening a phone bank for volunteers interested in helping those who were affected. The Red Cross set up an emergency shelter in Abilene for displaced families that could take shelter for the night. Survivors at the destroyed farmstead near Chapman, with help from locals and strangers, nearly completed their rebuilding of their property almost 10 months after the tornado. The woman who survived mostly unharmed, gave advice for survivors that were impacted by destructive tornado that destroyed much of Oak Grove, Missouri during a tornado outbreak that lasted from March 6–7, 2017.

=== Plausible EF5 intensity ===
Damage surveyors from the National Weather Service office in Topeka would rate the tornado upper-end EF4 with estimated winds of 180 mph (290 km/h), based on the complete destruction of an anchor-bolted, brick farmhouse southwest of Chapman. However, they also acknowledged that the possibility of winds approaching 200 mph (320 km/h) were likely, which is borderline EF5 intensity on the Enhanced Fujita scale. A higher rating wasn't warranted, due to much of the brick facade surrounding the farmhouse not being cleanly swept away, thus negating a higher rating. Nearby farm equipment and vehicles were also crushed and violently mangled by the tornado.

== See also ==
- List of F5, EF5, and IF5 tornadoes
  - Possible F5/EF5/IF5 intensity
- List of F4, EF4, and IF4 tornadoes
  - List of F4 and EF4 tornadoes (2010–2019)
- Weather of 2016
- Tornadoes of 2016
