= Heat urticaria =

- Specialty: Dermatology

Heat urticaria presents within five minutes after the skin has been exposed to heat above 43 °C (109 °F), with the exposed area becoming burned, stinging, and turning red, swollen, and indurated.

== See also ==
- Urticaria
- Skin lesion
- List of cutaneous conditions
