= 2024 Indian heat wave =

Natural disaster

Meteorological history
- Duration: April – June 2024
- Heat event
- Max temp: 50.5 °C (122.9 °F), recorded at Churu, Rajasthan

Overall effects
- Fatalities: 219+
- Areas affected: India

From April 2024 to June 2024, a severe and long heat wave affected India. The heat wave occurred during the Indian summer or pre-monsoon, which typically lasts from March to June, with peak temperatures in April and May. The year marked the third consecutive year of extreme heat waves in the country, a trend partly attributed to climate change.

Churu district in Rajasthan recorded a temperature of 50.5 °C (122.9 °F), the highest in India in eight years. A temperature of 52.9 °C was recorded in Mungeshpur, Delhi, and was initially thought to be record-breaking. However, it was later found to be approximately 3 °C too high due to a faulty sensor.

== Casualties ==
As of 3 June 2024, there were a total of 219 deaths reported from the heat wave, and 25,000 others suffered from heatstroke. The deaths include 33 workers who were stationed on election duty during the seventh and last phase of the 2024 Indian general elections. There were 147 reported deaths in the state of Odisha, and 12 more in Rajasthan.

In Rajasthan, temperatures reached 50 °C (122 °F) in Churu, Sirsa and Phalodi, while Delhi's Mungeshpur, Narela and Najafgarh also neared 50 °C on 28 May. There were more than twice as many heatwave days recorded in northwestern and eastern parts of the country than usual, mainly due to fewer non-monsoon thundershowers and warm winds blowing from neighbouring arid regions into India. IMD data showed that Delhi recorded its warmest night ever at a minimum temperature of 35.2 °C (95.36 °F).

Indian authorities reported over 40,000 cases of heatstroke through the country during the heat wave.

== Impact ==
Due to the intense heat increasing water consumption and lowering river levels, New Delhi suffered a water crisis, requiring water tankers to be driven into distribution points in order to provide hydration to citizens whose taps ran dry.

The intense, prolonged increase in temperature caused many manufacturing companies to lower working hours during the month of May, contributing to a national three-month low in the rate of increase in new orders. Due to increased usage of electricity for cooling, the All India Power Engineers Federation warned of potential blackouts and loss of power on 18 June 2024.

== Measures and preparedness actions ==
The NDMA and IMD are rolling out Heat Action Plans in 23 states, including early‑warning systems, district vulnerability maps and special guidance for outdoor workers. The central health ministry has asked states to improve monitoring of heat‑related illnesses, strengthen reporting via the IHIP and train health‑care workers in diagnosing and treating heat‑illness. Authorities introduced “heat‑stroke rooms” in hospitals for rapid‑cooling treatment and organised a whole‑of‑government approach to emergency cooling, but the scale of actual implementation remains uncertain. In New Delhi, the 2025 Heat Action Plan includes installing about 3,000 water‑coolers across the city, shaded footpaths, “cool” roofs and special heat‑wave wards in hospitals. Some states are using the State Disaster Mitigation Fund to build cooling shelters, upgrade infrastructure and set up early‑warning systems for heat. During peak heat, some states also reduced outdoor working hours and set up rehydration stations in markets and public areas.
