= 2019 India–Pakistan heat wave =

Severe heatwave in India and Pakistan

Meteorological history
- Duration: May - June 2019
- Heat wave
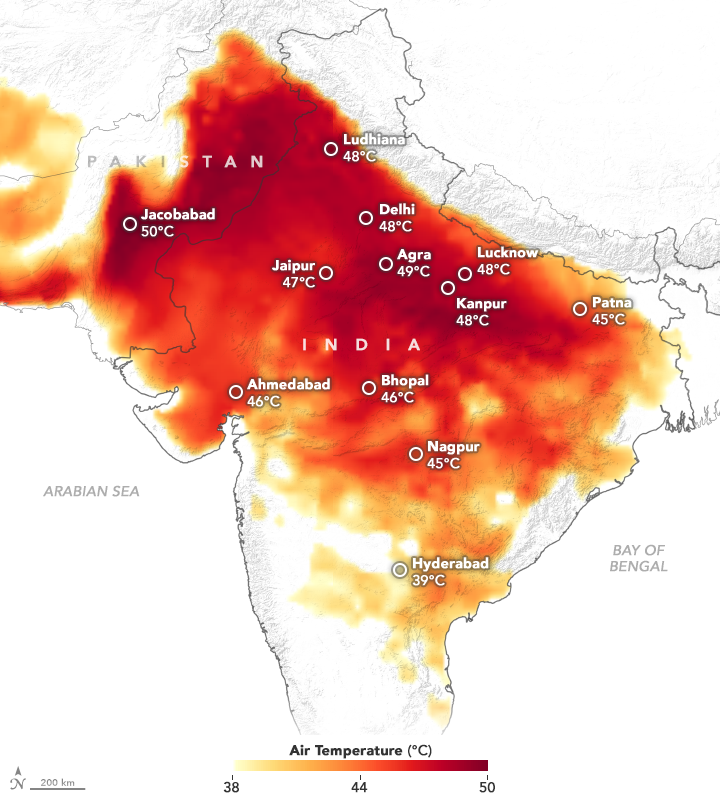
- Heat wave affected areas, from the NASA Earth observatory

Overall effects
- Fatalities: India: 184 in Bihar, plus dozens more in other states Pakistan: 5
- Areas affected: India; Pakistan

From mid-May to mid-June 2019, the republics of India and Pakistan had a severe heat wave. It was one of the hottest and longest heat waves in the subcontinent since the two countries began recording weather reports. The highest temperatures occurred in Churu, Rajasthan, reaching up to 50.8 °C (123.4 °F), a near record high in India, missing the record of 51.0 °C (123.8 °F) set in 2016 by a fraction of a degree. As of 12 June 2019, 32 days are classified as parts of the heatwave, making it the second longest ever recorded.

As a result of hot temperatures and inadequate preparation, more than 184 people died in the state of Bihar, with many more deaths reported in other parts of the country. In Pakistan, five infants died after extreme heat exposure.

The heat wave coincided with extreme droughts and water shortages across India and Pakistan. In mid-June, reservoirs that previously supplied Chennai ran dry, depriving millions. The water crisis was exacerbated by high temperatures and lack of preparation, causing protests and fights that sometimes led to killing and stabbing.

== Background ==
Heat waves worldwide have become more extreme and more frequent due to human-influenced climate change and global warming. Since 2004, India and Pakistan have experienced 11 of its 15 warmest recorded years. The frequency and duration of heat waves in India and Pakistan has increased. The Indian Institute of Tropical Meteorology has identified several contributing factors, including "El Niño Modoki", an irregular El Niño in which the central Pacific Ocean is warmer than the eastern part, and the loss of tree cover, which reduces shade, increasing temperatures, and reduces moisture in soil, which results in less evapotranspiration and more heat transfer into the atmosphere.

In response to the growing number of deaths from heat waves, the Indian government, although not addressing the root causes, began implementing measures intended to save lives in 2013. In Ahmedabad, for example, "school days were reduced, government work programs ceased, and free water was distributed in busy areas." Public gardens were opened during the daytime so that people could seek shade. Professor of public health Parthasarathi Ganguly estimated that 800 fewer people died in 2014 as a result of these policies.

In India, the rainy monsoon season typically begins on 1 June. However, in 2019, the season was delayed by seven days and began on 8 June. When it did occur, the monsoon made slow progress and only brought rains to 10–15% of the country by 19 June. Normally, two-thirds of the country would have received monsoon rains by this time. The lack of rainfall has intensified heat wave conditions and increased water scarcity.

== Impact ==
Significantly affected cities in India
Significantly affected cities in Pakistan

The heat wave has caused multiple deaths and cases of illness. As of 31 May 2019, 8 deaths and 456 cases of illness due to heat were reported in Maharashtra, at least 17 deaths in Telangana, and 3 deaths and 433 cases of heat stroke in Andhra Pradesh. On 10 June 2019, three passengers were found dead on a train as it arrived in Jhansi, apparently due to the extreme heat. A fourth passenger was found in critical condition and brought to a hospital where they died of overheating. In the state of Bihar, heat-related deaths reached 184 on 18 June according to Al Jazeera.

High temperatures have broken or nearly broken records in various cities across India and Pakistan. At one point, 11 of the 15 warmest places in the world were all located in the country. On 2 June 2019, the city of Churu recorded a temperature of 50.8 °C (123.4 °F), only one-fifth of a degree Celsius short of the country's highest-ever temperature, 51 °C (124 °F) during the 2016 heat wave. On 9 June 2019, Allahabad reached 48.9 °C (120.0 °F), breaking its previous all-time record. On 3 and 4 June 2019, the temperature in Jacobabad reached 49 °C (120 °F) making Pakistan's highest-ever temperature. On 10 June 2019, the temperature in Delhi reached 48 °C (118 °F), a new record high for the city in the month of June. On the same day, peak power usage in Delhi reached 6,686 MW, breaking all previous records. On 29 June 2019, the temperature in Islamabad and Rawalpindi reached 42 °C (108 °F).

The total number of deaths is unknown. For comparison, the 2003 European heat wave killed an estimated 35,000–70,000 people, with temperatures slightly less than in India and Pakistan. In human temperature physiology, core temperatures of 40.0 or 41.5 °C (104.0 or 106.7 °F) are said to be a fever of type hyperpyrexia, and considered a medical emergency as temperature may lead to problems including permanent brain damage, or death.

=== Water shortages ===
Droughts and water shortages have occurred in multiple states and provinces across India and Pakistan, worsening heat wave conditions. In Chennai, millions of people are without consistent access to water. A lack of rainwater and groundwater has left four of the reservoirs that supply the city completely dry. The inability to meet demand for water has forced businesses like hotels and restaurants to close. Water tankers from areas of Tamil Nadu unaffected by drought have been bringing water into some areas of the city. However, government tankers can take up to a month to appear after requested, so some wealthy residents and business owners have opted to pay for costly private water tankers. The poor who live in slums do not have this option; a family in Chennai's slums may receive as little as 30 litres (7.9 US gallons) of water every day compared to an average American household which uses 1,100 litres (290 US gallons) of water a day. In Coimbatore, at least 550 people were arrested for protesting the city's government for mismanaging the water crisis.

Conflicts over access to water have also occurred throughout India. On 7 June, six people were stabbed in Jharkhand during a fight near a water tanker, and one man was killed in a similar fight in Tamil Nadu. In Madhya Pradesh on 5 June, a fight over water led to two men being "seriously injured", while in a separate fight a day earlier, a water tanker driver was "beaten up". In early June, fifteen monkeys were found dead in a forest in Madhya Pradesh, possibly as a result of the heat wave. Veterinarian Arun Mishra says this may have happened due to a conflict over water with a larger group of 30–35 monkeys. Mishra said this was "rare and strange" because herbivores do not usually engage in such conflicts.

=== Bihar encephalitis outbreak ===
The heat wave is a possible aggravating factor in an encephalitis outbreak in Bihar which has killed over 100 children since 1 June.

== Responses ==
The Indian National Disaster Management Authority (NDMA) had a goal for keeping heat related deaths this year to single digits. In 2018, the heat wave death toll was kept at 20 through public safety measures; for example, government workers across the country conducted awareness campaigns and distributed free water. However, in 2019, the national general election took place and workers who normally issued heat wave warnings were instead performing election duties.

In early June, the Indian Meteorological Department issued a severe heat wave warning in Rajasthan and nearby areas such as Delhi. The Ministry of Health advised avoiding the sun between noon and 3 p.m. and not drinking alcohol, tea, or coffee. Meanwhile, the NDMA recommended covering the head, cross-ventilating rooms, and sleeping under a slightly wet sheet.

Asphalt used for roads expectantly begins to melt at 50 °C (122 °F); therefore, on 3 June, the government of Churu poured water onto roads in order to cool them and prevent them from melting.

In response to fights over water in Madhya Pradesh, the police were deployed to guard water tankers and other sources of water from rioters, beginning 8 June.

On 17 June, the government of Gaya, a city in Bihar, imposed Section 144 to be active, which empowers an executive magistrate to prohibit an assembly of more than four persons in an area, and banned construction work and assemblies between 11 a.m. and 4 p.m.

The Pakistan Medical Association urged people to learn about the measures to avoid heat-related deaths.
