= 2016 Indian heat wave =

Major heat wave in April and May

The 2016 Indian heat wave was a major heat wave in April and May of that year. A national record high temperature of 51.0 °C (123.8 °F) was set in the town of Phalodi, in the state of Rajasthan. Over 1,100 people died with 330 million affected to some degree. There were also water shortages with drought worsening the impact of the heat wave.

== Background ==
According to the India Meteorological Department, a heat wave is defined as a maximum air temperature of at least 40 °C (104 °F) in the plains and 30 °C (86 °F) in hilly regions, and is also declared when the maximum temperature remains 45 °C (113 °F) or higher, irrespective of the normal maximum temperature.

In India, the month of May is typically one of the hottest and driest. In 2016, the heat came early, with 111 heat-related casualties reported by 8 April. Most of the heat waves in India since 1998 are associated with droughts; a major drought and worsening water shortages had affected around 330 million people by 23 May. The high temperatures, combined with other atmospheric disturbances, led to thunderstorms and lightning strikes in some states, leading to deaths, the destruction of houses and uprooted trees, as well as affecting crops and farm animals. The monsoon rains that would provide some relief were nearly one week behind the scheduled date, and would not reach the north until several weeks later.

More than 20,000 people have died of heat wave-related causes in India since 1992; the heat wave in 2015 was one of the five deadliest on record.

== Impact ==
The highest temperatures typically occur in May or June prior to the annual monsoon. Increasing temperatures and more frequent heat waves appear to be a result of human-induced climate change. In response to these more frequent events, many cities across India have implemented plans to warn people of the dangers of excessive heat.

While the number of deaths was relatively small, those most likely to die from heat exposure were labourers who were forced to work outside despite a government ban limiting work during the hottest part of the day. Schools were also ordered to extend the summer holiday to reduce the risk to children. The greatest impact of the extreme temperatures were on crops, with hundreds of millions of people affected by the failure of food crops.

The government hospital in Phalodi reported 500 patient visits, double the average number; many of those patients were complaining of diarrhea. To combat the heat, people drink water, but in 2016 the heat was coupled with drought. Lack of adequate water leads to dehydration and consumption of contaminated water leads to diarrhea. It is likely that the death totals were significantly underestimated due to a lack of systematic data collection.

== Health effects ==
A heat wave usually causes severe health conditions and death. Heat stroke and heat stress are two of these adverse effects. Also, the heat wave was the main cause of the prevalence of cardiovascular and respiratory diseases in hospitals. The humidity and temperature increases caused harmful health effects, especially for vulnerable people such as the elderly, children, outdoor workers and people in poor living conditions. Indian people's health were affected indirectly by water scarcity for both drinking and grazing purposes. That led to heat-related health challenges such as dehydration hyperthermia. Therefore, Indian people suffered from dizziness and organ dysfunction. In Phalodi, people suffered from diarrhea and high body temperature.

The mortality rate differs in India during different months and in different cities. At the beginning of April 2016, more than 100 people died from heat. In the three Indian cities of Delhi, Telangana and Odisha more than 600 died in just one month. In the region of Bihar, 180 people died, and a large number were affected by heat stroke. The National Disaster Management Authority Government of India shows that 1,111 died because of the heat wave in 2016.

== Local response ==
In Orissa, Maharashtra and Gujarat, programs were launched to educate people on hydration, providing shelters and training medical workers. In Andhra Pradesh, government workers distributed water and buttermilk, whilst TV and newspaper adverts urged people to stay indoors during peak hours.

Schools were shut down in Odisha and Telangana weeks ahead of summer holidays. Hospitals stopped performing surgeries. A ban on day-time (9am - 6pm) cooking was imposed to prevent accidental fires. India's Supreme Court ordered the Indian Premier League out of Maharashtra, stopping 13 cricket matches because of the amount of water needed to prepare pitches.

There were numerous calls for more government action. Leading Indian economists, rights activists and academics sent an open letter to the government expressing the same. In his monthly radio address, Modi pledged 20 billion rupees ($400 million) to deal with the crisis.

In Maharastra, the local government's response to the potable water shortage was to supply water to its city via train. The train became known as "Jaldoot" (Hindi), meaning "water saviour". In a single nine-hour journey the train was able to deliver 2.5 million litres of water.
