= 2015 Pakistan heat wave =

Heat wave in southern Pakistan

Meteorological history
- Date: June 2015
- Heat event
- A map marking significantly affected cities

Overall effects
- Fatalities: About 2,000
- Areas affected: Pakistan

A severe heat wave with temperatures as high as 49 °C (120 °F) struck southern Pakistan in June 2015. It caused the deaths of about 2,000 people from dehydration and heat stroke, mostly in Sindh province and its capital city, Karachi. The heat wave also claimed the lives of zoo animals and countless agricultural livestock. The event followed a separate heat wave in neighboring India that killed 2,500 people in May 2015.

== Recorded temperatures ==
Extreme temperatures started to grip Pakistan's southern areas on 18 June 2015, and peaked on 20 June:

Date	Place	Temperature
20 June 2015	Karachi	45 °C (113 °F)
20 June 2015	Larkana	49 °C (120 °F)
20 June 2015	Turbat	49 °C (120 °F)
20 June 2015	Sibi	49 °C (120 °F)
20 June 2015	Rahim Yar Khan	43 °C (109 °F)
20 June 2015	Dadu	44 °C (111 °F)
20 June 2015	Multan	40 °C (104 °F)
20 June 2015	Nawabshah	41 °C (106 °F)
20 June 2015	Hyderabad	42 °C (108 °F)

Karachi recorded its highest temperatures since 1979. By 24 June 2015, the temperature and death toll began to abate; the maximum temperature in Karachi was 37 °C (98 °F), and officials reported 58 deaths compared to 300 the previous day.

== Contributory factors ==
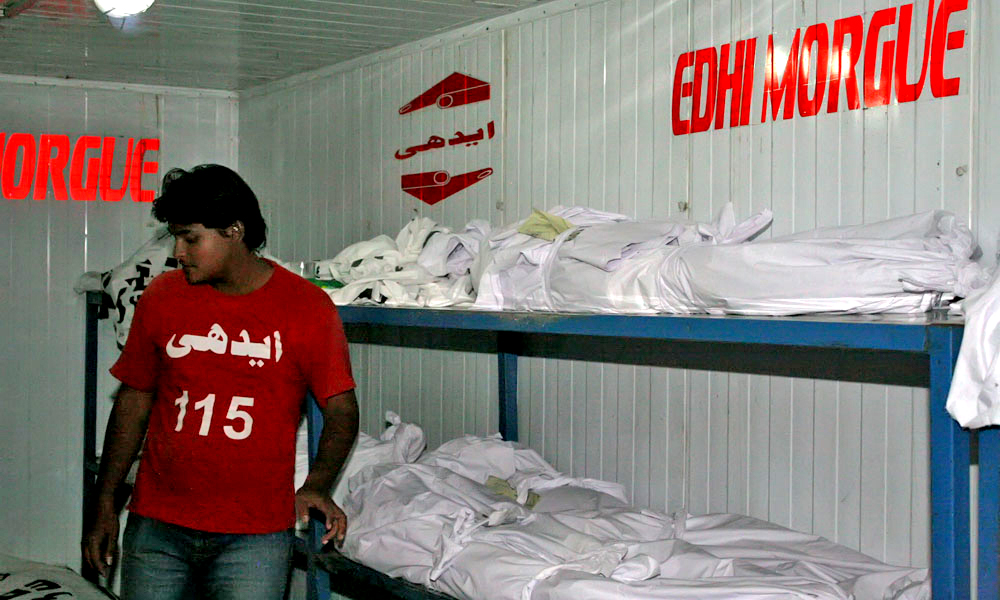
Edhi Foundation morgue in Karachi during the heat wave.

Asif Shuja, the former director general of the Pakistan Environmental Protection Agency, claimed the heat wave was a symptom of global climate change, aggravated by deforestation, expansion of asphalt superhighways, and rapid urbanisation. He maintained that "there has been a rise in the Earth's average temperature from 15.5 °C (59.9 °F) to 16.2 °C (61.2 °F) over the last 100 years, due to which we are experiencing such extreme weather conditions both in summers and winters." Shuja went on to say that the lack of sophisticated weather prediction technology in Pakistan contributed to the casualties of the heat wave.

Moreover, widespread failures of the electrical grid left many locations without working air-conditioners, fans, or water pumps, adding further to the death toll. Prime Minister Nawaz Sharif tasked a committee comprising Abdul Qadir Baloch, a retired General of the Pakistan Army and Minister for States and Frontier Regions, together with State Minister for Health Sciences Regulation and Coordination Saira Afzal Tarar. The two Ministers visited Karachi's Jinnah Postgraduate Medical Centre in the wake of deaths due to the severe heat wave. Speaking to the media during their visit, Baloch said that the K-Electric was being investigated for load shedding. Baloch held the K-Electric, KW&SB and Sindh government responsible for the increase in heat wave mortality in Karachi. The power regulator NEPRA reported that K-Electric was not generating electricity according to its generation capacity.

The heat wave coincided with the month of Ramadan, when Muslims observe fasting and no drinking from dawn till dark. This increased the risks of dehydration and heat stroke.

== Emergency measures ==
Prime Minister Nawaz Sharif declared a state of emergency, activated military relief efforts, and warned electric supply companies that he would not tolerate power outages during Ramadan. The Sindh government declared an emergency for all government hospitals in the province, and the University of Karachi postponed its exams for at least one month. An influential Muslim cleric in Pakistan decreed a fatwa that if "a religious and qualified doctor" advises (for safety of life), Muslims are allowed to skip or break their Ramadan daytime fast, and then to complete those days of fasting when Ramadan and the emergency have passed. At the peak of the June 2015 heat wave, the number of corpses exceeded local capacities for storage or burial, as the emergency efforts proved insufficient to prevent enormous loss of life.

== See also ==
- 2017 Pakistan heat wave
- List of extreme weather records in Pakistan
