= 2015 Indian heat wave =

Meteorological history
- Duration: May 2015
- Heat event
- A map marking significantly affected cities

Overall effects
- Fatalities: At least 2,500 as of 3 June 2015
- Areas affected: India

In May 2015, India was struck by a severe heat wave. As of 3 June 2015, it caused the deaths of at least 2,500 people in multiple regions. The heat wave occurred during the Indian dry season, which typically lasts from March to July with peak temperatures in April and May. Although it typically remains hot until late October, Indian monsoons often provide some respite from the heat.

The South Indian states of Andhra Pradesh and the neighbouring Telangana, where more than 1,735 and 585 people died respectively, were the areas most affected by the heat wave. Other casualties were from the eastern states of West Bengal and Odisha.

Daytime temperatures in affected areas in late May consistently ranged between 40 °C and 45 °C, with some locales briefly nearing 48 °C.

The high demand for electricity to power air conditioning led to power outages in some cities. The heat wave saw the highest recorded temperatures since 1995, subsequently surpassed in May 2016 by a separate heat wave in Phalodi, which registered an unprecedented 51 °C.

== Background ==
According to the Indian Meteorological Department (IMD), a heat wave is qualified when air temperatures of at least 40 °C (104 °F) in the plains or greater than 30 °C (86 °F) in the hilly regions. For the IMD classification of heat waves, temperatures greater than 46 °C (114.8 °F) are considered and classified as severe heat waves.

Every year India experiences severe heat waves in summer, but in the year 2015, casualties were abnormally high. Most of the deaths were concentrated in Andhra Pradesh, Telangana, Punjab, Uttar Pradesh, Odisha and Bihar. More than 20,000 people have died of heat-related causes in India since 1990. In the recent past, the most severe period of hot weather occurred in 1995, when 1,677 people died due to a series of heatwaves. 793 people died in 2011 while 1,247 died in 2012 due to heat related causes. In 2013, 1,216 people died due to the heat. With over 2,500 deaths, the heat wave has proven to be the most deadly since 1979. The casualties crossed the mark of previous years rapidly in 2015.

== Causes ==
The heat wave was caused in large part by sparser pre-monsoon season showers, which brought less moisture than normal to the area, leaving large parts of India arid and dry. The sudden end of pre-monsoon rain showers, an uncommon trend in India, has contributed to the heat waves. Additionally, the monsoon season is later and further south than the normal trend. This weather pattern, coupled with the El Niño effect, which often increases temperatures in Asia, combined to create the record high temperatures. High humidity compounded the effects of the temperatures on residents. The Loo, a dry wind originating from Pakistan and northwest India, has contributed to increasing the temperature in India.

== Affected areas ==
| State | Number of deaths | As of |
|---|---|---|
| Andhra Pradesh | 1,735 | 3 June 2015 |
| Telangana | 585 | 3 June 2015 |
| Odisha | 35 (Note: This is the official sun stroke death toll in Odisha, not the overall heat wave death toll.) | 5 June 2015 |
| Uttar Pradesh | 22 | 30 May 2015 |
| West Bengal | 13 | 27 May 2015 |
| Gujarat | 10 | 28 May 2015 |
| Madhya Pradesh | 10 | 29 May 2015 |
| Delhi | 5 | 27 May 2015 |
| Maharashtra | 2 | 27 May 2015 |
| Rajasthan | 2 | 25 May 2015 |
| Chhattisgarh | 1 | 25 May 2015 |
| Bihar | 1 | 29 May 2015 |
| Karnataka | 1 | 30 May 2015 |
| Total | 2,500 | 3 June 2015 |

The heat wave affected many people in various states and regions, including Madhya Pradesh, Vidarbha, Andhra Pradesh, Telangana, Bihar and Jharkhand. On 21 May the temperature in the Indian capital, New Delhi, was reported to be 42.6 °C (108.7 °F), with black asphalt roads reportedly melting and pedestrian crossing stripes curling. On the same day, a temperature of 45.4 °C (113.7 °F) was recorded in Jharsuguda and at least 12 people were reported dead due to heat stroke the following day. On 24 May in Allahabad, a temperature of 47.7 °C (117.9 °F) was recorded. Cities such as Delhi and Kolkata recorded 44.5 °C (112.1 °F) and 36.0 °C (96.8 °F) on the same day, respectively. In the state of Odisha, 23 people died of heat stroke by 24 May. Many deaths occurred in the state of Andhra Pradesh where at least 246 people have died by 25 May, and overall, the death toll was registered at 1,735.

The temperature in Hyderabad on 21 May was 46 °C (115 °F) and on 22 May was 44.3 °C (111.7 °F), above the normal maximum of 39.9 °C (103.8 °F) recorded on the same day in the previous years. On the following day the temperature in the city was also above a normal maximum temperature, at 43.6 °C (110.5 °F) compared to 39.5 °C (103.1 °F) recorded on the same day in earlier years. On 24 May, Khammam recorded its highest ever temperature at 48.0 °C (118.4 °F). The air temperature on hill stations like Mussoorie, situated 2,010 metres (6,580 ft) above sea level, rose to 36.0 °C (96.8 °F).

On 25 May, more than 90 deaths due to sun stroke were recorded in the states of Andhra Pradesh and Telangana. The temperature on that day continued to be above normal, especially in the coastal Andhra region where the maximum temperature recorded was 47.0 °C (116.6 °F) in Guntur district. The highest temperature in India recorded on that day was at 47.6 °C (117.7 °F) in Titlagarh, Odisha.

By 3 June, 50 lakh (five million) chicken were killed by the heat wave across Telangana within a span of two weeks, causing the price of eggs and chickens to rise throughout the state as well as in the neighbouring Andhra Pradesh.

On 3 June, rainfall caused the temperatures to decrease in many areas of Andhra Pradesh and Telangana. No heat-related deaths were reported on that day across the two states. The highest temperature recorded on the same day was 43 °C (109 °F) in Nizamabad. On 5 June, Odisha reported temperatures to have decreased to less than 40.0 °C (104.0 °F) across the state, but the humidity continued to be high.

== Recorded temperatures ==
| Date | Place | Temperature |
|---|---|---|
| 21 May 2015 | Jharsuguda | 45.4 °C (113.7 °F) |
| 21 May 2015 | Hyderabad | 47.1 °C (116.8 °F) |
| 24 May 2015 | Allahabad | 47.7 °C (117.9 °F) |
| 24 May 2015 | Khammam | 48.0 °C (118.4 °F) |
| 25 May 2015 | Delhi Airport | 46.4 °C (115.5 °F) |
| 25 May 2015 | Safdarjung (Delhi) | 45.5 °C (113.9 °F) |
| 25 May 2015 | Bhubaneswar Airport | 45.4 °C (113.7 °F) |
| 27 May 2015 | Daltonganj | 47.0 °C (116.6 °F) |
| 29 May 2015 | Palamau | 47.0 °C (116.6 °F) |
| 29 May 2015 | Chandrapur | 47.6 °C (117.7 °F) |
| 30 May 2015 | Nagpur | 47.1 °C (116.8 °F) |
| 8 June 2015 | Allahabad | 47.8 °C (118.0 °F) |
| 9 June 2015 | Allahabad | 47.6 °C (117.7 °F) |
| 10 June 2015 | Delhi Airport | 44.6 °C (112.3 °F) |
| 10 June 2015 | Bhubaneswar Airport | 44.0 °C (111.2 °F) |
| 11 June 2015 | Kolkata | 39.0 °C (102.2 °F) |

== Relief efforts ==
The government of Andhra Pradesh announced ₹ 100,000 to the next of kin of people killed in the heatwave in the state. Drinking water, oral rehydration salts and intravenous fluids were made available at public places like railway stations and bus stations. Emergency medical camps are set up across the state. An awareness campaign was launched advising citizens to not leave their homes at noon unless absolutely necessary.

== See also ==
- 2015 Pakistani heat wave
