= List of heat waves =

This is a partial list of temperature phenomena that have been labeled as heat waves, listed in order of occurrence.

== Before 20th century ==
- 1473 heat and drought in Europe
- 1540 European drought – Extreme drought and heatwave lasting 11 months in Europe.
- July 1743 heatwave in China – Beijing reached 44.4 °C (111.9 °F) on 25 July, higher than any modern records. 11,400 people reportedly died.
- July 1757 heatwave – Europe, hottest summer in Europe since 1540 and until 2003.

=== 19th century ===
- 1808 United Kingdom heat wave
- 1881 North American heat wave
- 1896 Eastern North America heat wave – killed 1,500 people in August 1896.
- 1900 – historical heat wave of the center of Argentina between the first eight days of February 1900 known as "the week of fire" that affected the cities of Buenos Aires and Rosario with temperatures of up to 37 °C (99 °F) but with a very high index of humidity that elevated the sensation of heat to 49 °C (120 °F) severely affecting the health of people and causing at least 478 fatalities.

== 20th century ==
- 1901 – the 1901 eastern United States heat wave killed 9,500 in the Eastern United States.
- 1906 – the 1906 United Kingdom heat wave began in August and lasted into September broke numerous records. On 2 September temperatures reached 35.6 °C (96.1 °F), which still holds the September record, but some places beat their local record during September 1911 and September 2016.
- 1911 – the 1911 Eastern North America heat wave killed between 380 and 2,000 people.
- 1911 – the 1911 United Kingdom heat wave was one of the most severe periods of heat to hit the country with temperatures around 36 °C (97 °F). The heat began in early July and did not let up until mid-September where even in September temperatures were still up to 33 °C (91 °F). It took 79 years for temperature higher to be recorded in the United Kingdom during 1990 United Kingdom heat wave.
- 1911 – 41,072 deaths were reported during a heat wave in France.
- 1913 – in July, the hottest heat wave ever struck California. During this heat wave, Death Valley recorded a record high temperature of 57 °C (134 °F) at Furnace Creek, which still remains the highest ambient air temperature recorded on Earth.
- 1921 – hottest July on record across Eastern Canada and parts of the Northeastern US, part of a very warm year in those places. Parts of the United Kingdom also saw recording breaking heat, also part of a very warm year. The Central England Temperature for July was 18.5 °C (65.3 °F), which was the 8th warmest since records began in 1659, and the warmest since 1852. The year of 1921 was the warmest on record at the time but has since been eclipsed by 15 other years.
- 1923–1924 – during a period of 160 such days from 31 October 1923 to 7 April 1924, the Western Australian town of Marble Bar reached 38 °C (100 °F).
- 1930s – almost every year from 1930 to 1938 featured historic heat waves and droughts somewhere in North America, part of the Dust Bowl years. Many mid-Atlantic/Ohio valley states recorded their highest temperatures during July 1934. The longest continuous string of 38 °C (100 °F) or higher temperatures was reached for 101 days in Yuma, Arizona during 1937 and the highest temperatures ever reached in Canada were recorded in two locations in Saskatchewan in July 1937.
- 1935 – in the summer months this heatwave was characterized by unusually high temperatures across the United Kingdom.
- 1936 – the 1936 North American heat wave during the Dust Bowl followed one of the coldest winters on record—the 1936 North American cold wave - and was particularly brutal. 13 states and hundreds of cities across the Northeast, Midwest, and Great Plains in the U.S. recorded record high temperatures with over 5,000 people dying from the heat.
- 1947 – record breaking temperature of 37.6 °C (99.7 °F) in Paris recorded on 26 June 1947.
- 1950s – prolonged severe drought and heat wave occurred in the early 1950s throughout the central and southern United States. Every year from 1952 to 1955 featured major heat waves across North America. In some areas it was drier than during the Dust Bowl and the heat wave in most areas was within the top five on record. The heat was particularly severe in 1954 with 22 days of temperatures exceeding 38 °C (100 °F) covering significant parts of eleven states. On 14 July, the thermometer reached 47 °C (117 °F) at East St. Louis, Illinois, which remains the record highest temperature for that state.
- October 1952 – Romania was hit by very hot weather. Temperatures reached 39.0 °C (102.2 °F) on 2 October, with Bucharest reaching 35.2 °C (95.4 °F). Temperatures on the night of 2–3 October were also just under 26 °C (79 °F).
- 1955 – the 1955 United Kingdom heat wave was a period of hot weather that was accompanied by drought. In some places it was the worst drought on record, more severe than 1976 and 1995.
- 1960 – on 2 January, Oodnadatta, South Australia hit 50.7 °C (123.3 °F) degrees, the highest temperature ever recorded in the Southern Hemisphere and Oceania.
- 1972 – heat waves of 1972 in New York and Northeastern United States were significant. Almost 900 people died; the heat conditions lasted almost 16 days, aggravated by very high humidity levels.
- 1976 – the 1976 United Kingdom heat wave was one of the hottest in living memory, with temperatures exceeding 32 °C (90 °F) somewhere in the country for over two consecutive weeks. The heatwave was also accompanied by one of the worst droughts in British history, and reservoirs reached historic low levels during the heat wave that would not be seen again until the heat waves of the 21st century. The maximum recorded temperature of the heat wave, 35.9 °C (96.6 °F) at Cheltenham, Gloucestershire was at the time the third highest reliably recorded temperature in British history, with only the 1911 heat wave achieving higher reliably recorded temperatures.
- 1980 – an estimated 1,000 people died in the 1980 United States heat wave and drought, which impacted the central and eastern United States. Temperatures were highest in the southern plains. From June through September, temperatures remained above 32 °C (90 °F) all but two days in Kansas City, Missouri. The Dallas/Fort Worth area experienced 42 consecutive days with high temperatures above 38 °C (100 °F), with temperatures reaching 47 °C (117 °F) at Wichita Falls, Texas, on 28 June. Economic losses were $20 billion (1980 dollars).
- 1981 – August 1981 heat wave in the Pacific Northwest.
- 1983 – during the summer of 1983 temperatures over 38 °C (100 °F) were common across Iowa, Missouri, Illinois, Michigan, Wisconsin, Indiana, Ohio, Minnesota, Kansas, Nebraska, and certain parts of Kentucky; the summer of 1983 remains one of the hottest summers ever recorded in many of the states affected. The hundred-degree readings were accompanied by very dry conditions associated with drought affecting the Corn Belt States and Upper Midwest. The heat also affected the Southeastern U.S. and the Mid-Atlantic states as well that same summer. New York Times represented articles about the heat waves of 1983 affecting the central United States. This heat wave was associated with the I-94 derecho.
- 1983 – France recorded a record 26 days of Heat-wave conditions, the longest such defined period. The United Kingdom recorded the hottest month ever by average temperature until it was beaten in August 1995.
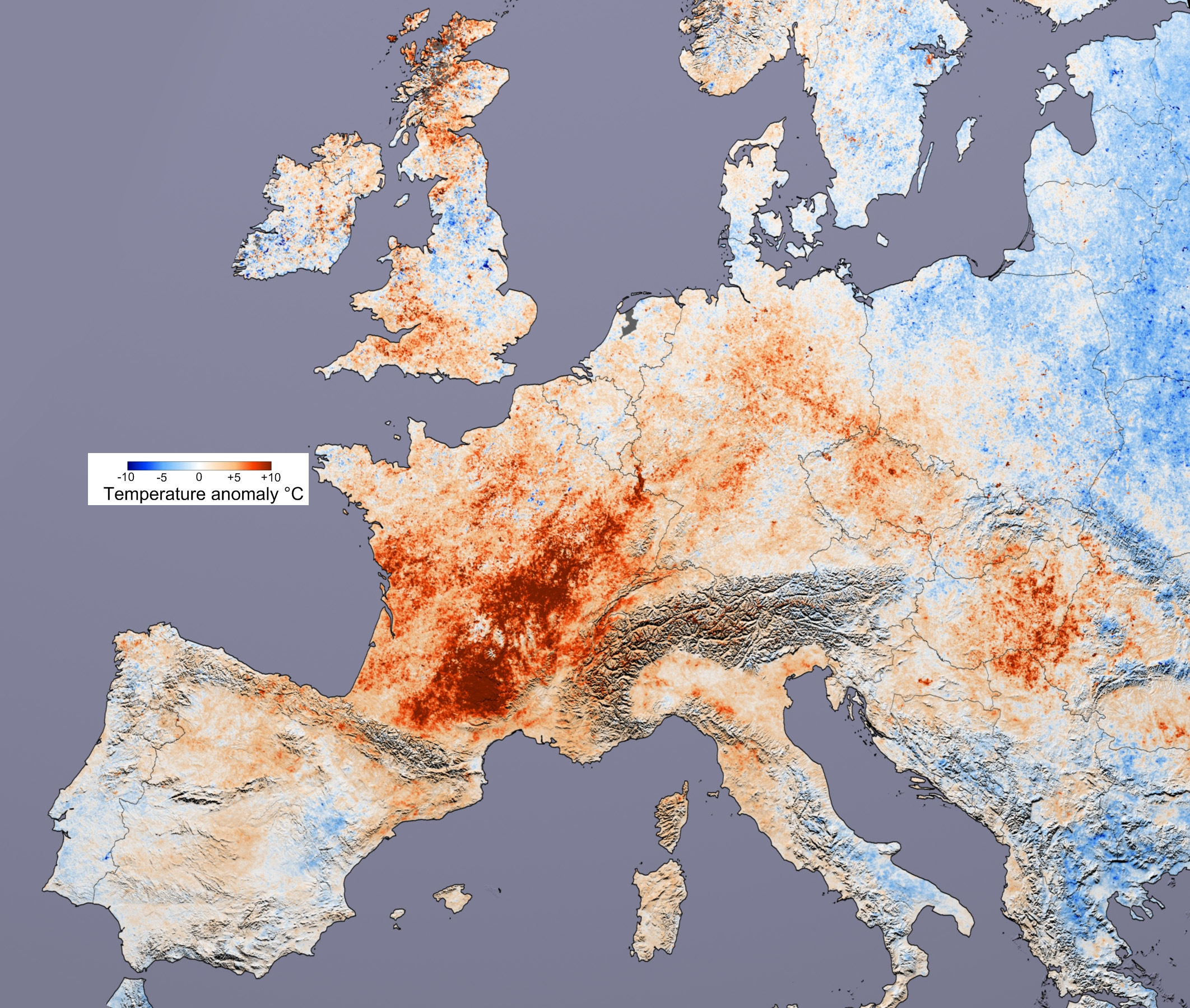
  Temperature difference in Europe from the average during the European heat wave of 2003
- 1987 – prolonged heat wave from 20 to 31 July in Greece, with more than 1,000 deaths in the area of Athens. The maximum temperature measured was 41.9 °C (107.4 °F) at 23 July at the center of Athens and in the suburb of Nea Philadelphia, 8 kilometres (5.0 mi) northeast was 43.6 °C (110.5 °F) on 27 July, and were combined with high minima, with the highest being 30.2 °C (86.4 °F) in the center of Athens at 27 July and 29.9 °C (85.8 °F) at 24 July at Nea Philadelfia. The lowest minimum was 25.6 °C (78.1 °F) at the center of Athens. Moreover, humidity was high and wind speeds low, contributing to human discomfort, even during the night.
- 1988 – intense heat spells in combination with the drought of 1988, reminiscent of the dust bowl years caused deadly results across the United States. Official estimates report that 5,000 to 10,000 people died because of constant heat across the United States. Some estimates put total deaths at close to 17,000.
- 1990 – cities across the United Kingdom broke their all-time temperature records in the dramatic 1990 United Kingdom heat wave. Temperatures peaked at 37.1 °C (98.8 °F) at Cheltenham, Gloucestershire. This led to one of the hottest Augusts on record going back to 1659. Also in France a several day heat wave is reported (France-Soir, 4 September 1990) with temperatures exceeding 40 degrees Celsius.
- 1994 – Intense heat wave in Poland between July and August, with maximum temperature 39.5 °C (103.1 °F). This heat caused 1076 additional deaths in 10 largest Polish cities.
- 1995 – During the first week of February 1995, California, including Los Angeles, experienced a record-breaking heat wave, and on 20 February 1995, it was 35 °C (95 °F) in Los Angeles during a Presidents' Day heat wave.
- 1995 – the 1995 Chicago heat wave produced record high dew point levels and heat indices in the Chicago area and Wisconsin; temperatures reached as high as 41 °C (106 °F). The lack of emergency cooling facilities and inadequate response from civic authorities to the senior population, particularly in lower income neighborhoods in Chicago and other Midwestern cities, lead to at least 778 deaths—mostly which were African American Chicagoans. A series of damaging derechos occurred on the periphery of the hot air dome.
- 1995 – the United Kingdom experienced its third hottest summer since at least 1659. August was the hottest on record since 1659 and also the hottest month ever recorded until July 2006. The summer was also the driest on record since at least 1766. Temperatures peaked at 35.2 °C (95.4 °F) on 1 August at Boxworth, Cambridgeshire, which did not break the all-time record.
- 1996 – During the first week of February 1996 California, including Los Angeles, experienced a heat wave, with a high recorded temperature of 28.9 °C (84.0 °F) on 7 February 1996.
- 1997 – the United Kingdom experienced its third major heatwave in 7 years with August 1997 being one of the hottest on record.
- 1999 – a heat wave and drought in the eastern United States during the summer of 1999. Rainfall shortages resulted in worst drought on record for Maryland, Delaware, New Jersey, and Rhode Island. The state of West Virginia was declared a disaster area. 3.81 million acres (15,400 km^{2}) were consumed by fire as of mid-August. Record heat throughout the country resulted in 502 deaths nationwide. There were many deaths in urban centers of the Midwest.
- 2000 – in late Summer 2000, a heat wave occurred in the southern United States, breaking many cities' all-time maximum temperature records.

== 21st century ==
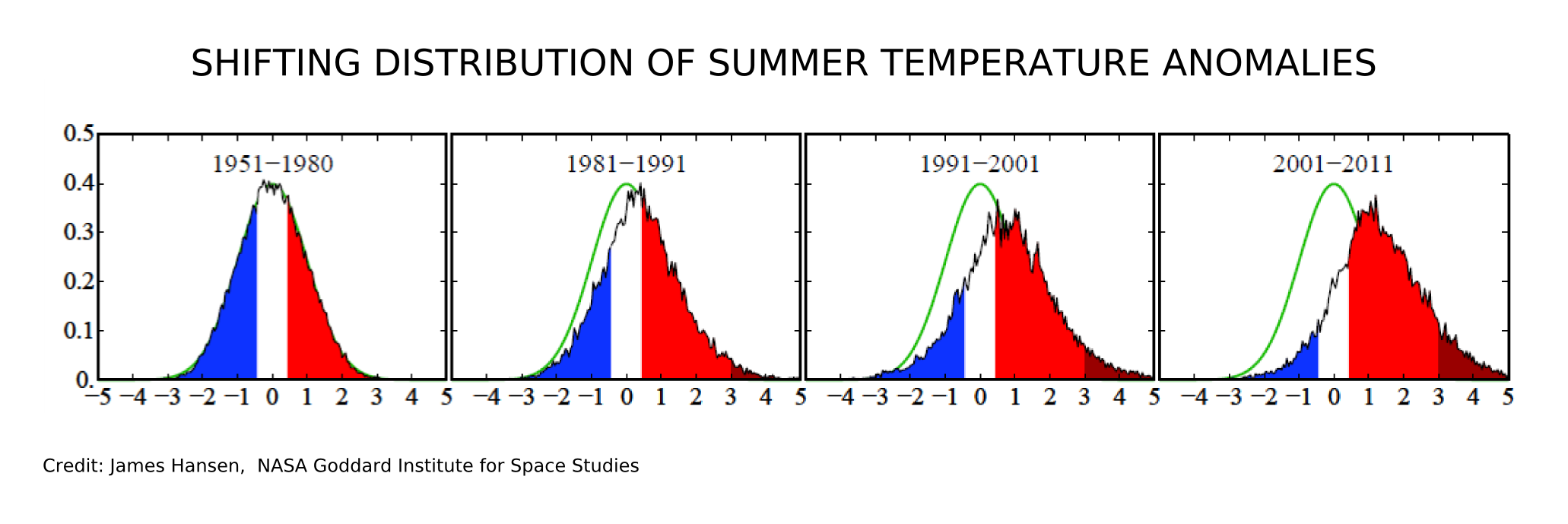

=== 2001–2009 ===
- In early August 2001 an intense heatwave hit the eastern seaboard of the United States and neighboring southeastern Canada. For over a week, temperatures climbed above 35 °C (95 °F) combined with stifling high humidity. Newark, New Jersey, tied its all-time record high temperature of 41 °C (106 °F) with a heat index of over 50 °C (122 °F).
- In April 2002 a summer-like heat wave in spring affected much of the Eastern United States.
- In July 2002 a heatwave in China killed at least 7 people and resulted in hospitalization of over 3500 people.
- During April 2003 there was a summer-like heatwave that affected the United Kingdom, mainly England and Wales, where temperature records were broken.
- The European heat wave of 2003 affected much of western Europe, breaking temperature records. Much of the heat was concentrated in Spain, England and in France, where nearly 15,000 people died. In Portugal, the temperatures reached as high as 47 °C (117 °F) in the south.
- The European heat wave of 2006 was the second massive heat wave to hit the continent in four years, with temperatures rising to 36.7 °C (98.1 °F) in Paris; in Ireland, which has a moderate maritime climate, temperatures of over 32 °C (90 °F) were reported. Temperatures of 35 °C (95 °F) were reached in the Benelux and Germany (in some areas 38 °C (100 °F)), while Great Britain recorded 36.5 °C (97.7 °F). Many heat records were broken (including the hottest ever July temperature in Great Britain) and many people who experienced the heat waves of 1976 and 2003 drew comparisons with them. The highest average July temperatures were recorded at many locations in Great Britain, Netherlands, Denmark, Sweden and Germany, and in the UK, July 2006 was the hottest month ever recorded and remains so today, even though the all-time temperature records of August 1990 and August 2003 were not reached.
- The 2006 North American heat wave affected a wide area of the United States and parts of neighboring Canada during July and August 2006. Over 220 deaths were reported. Temperatures in some parts of South Dakota exceeded 46 °C (115 °F). Also, California experienced temperatures that were extraordinarily high, with records ranging from 38 to 54 °C (100 to 130 °F). On 22 July, the County of Los Angeles recorded its highest temperature ever at 48 °C (119 °F). Humidity levels in California were also unusually high, although low compared with normal gulf coast/eastern seaboard summer humidity they were significant enough to cause widespread discomfort. Additionally, the heat wave was associated a series of derechos that produced widespread damage.
- The European heat wave of 2007 affected primarily south-eastern Europe during late June through August. Bulgaria experienced its hottest year on record, with previously unrecorded temperatures above 45 °C (113 °F). The 2007 Greek forest fires were associated with the heat wave.
- During the 2007 Asian heat wave, the Indian city of Datia experienced temperatures of 48 °C (118 °F).
- In January 2008, Alice Springs in Australia's Northern Territory recorded ten consecutive days of temperatures above 40 °C (104 °F) with the average temperature for that month being 39.8 °C (103.6 °F). In March 2008, Adelaide, South Australia experienced maximum temperatures of above 35 °C (95 °F) for fifteen consecutive days, seven days more than the previous longest stretch of 35 °C (95 °F) days. The March 2008 heat wave also included eleven consecutive days above 38 °C (100 °F). The heat wave was especially notable because it occurred in March, an autumn month, in which Adelaide averages only 2.3 days above 35 °C (95 °F).
- The eastern United States experienced an early summer heat wave from 6–10 June 2008 with record temperatures. There was a heat wave in Southern California beginning late June, which contributed to widespread fires. On 6 July, a renewed heat wave was forecast, which was expected to affect the entire state.
- In July 2008, the United Kingdom was mostly cool and wet for the first three weeks, followed by a brief warm, sunny, and humid spell at the very end of the month. Temperatures peaked later in the month, reaching 29.7 °C (85.5 °F) at Kew Gardens, London on 27 July and hitting a high of 30.2 °C (86.4 °F) on 28 July 2008 — marking the highest temperature recorded for the year.
- In early 2009, Adelaide, South Australia was hit by a heat wave with temperatures exceeding 40 °C (104 °F) for six days in a row, while many rural areas experienced temperatures hovering around 45 °C (113 °F). Kyancutta on the Eyre Peninsula endured at least one day at 48 °C (118 °F), with 46 and 47 being common in the hottest parts of the state. Melbourne, in neighbouring Victoria recorded 3 consecutive days over 43 °C (109 °F), and also recorded its highest ever temperature 8 days later in a secondary heatwave, with temperatures peaking at 46.4 °C (115.5 °F). During this heat wave Victoria suffered from large bushfires which killed 173 people and destroyed more than 2,500 homes. There were also over half a million people without power as the heatwave blew transformers and the power grid was overloaded.
- In August 2009, Argentina experienced a period of unusual and exceptionally hot weather during 24–30 August, during the Southern Hemisphere winter, just a month before Spring, when an unusual and unrecorded winter heat wave hit the country. A shot of tropical heat drawn unusually far southward hiked temperatures 22 °C (72 °F) above normal in the city of Buenos Aires and across the northern-centre regions of the country. Several records were broken. Even though normal high temperatures for late August are in the lower 15 °C (59 °F), readings topped 30 °C (86 °F) degrees at midweek, then topped out above 32 °C (90 °F) degrees during the weekend. Temperatures hit 33.8 °C (92.8 °F) on 29 August and finally 34.6 °C (94.3 °F) on 30 August in Buenos Aires, making it the hottest day ever recorded in winter breaking the 1996 winter record of 33.7 °C (92.7 °F). In the city of Santa Fe, 38.3 °C (100.9 °F) degrees on 30 August were registered, well above the normal highs of around 15 °C (59 °F). As per the Meteorological Office of Argentina, August 2009 has been the warmest month during winter since official measurements began.

=== 2010 ===
- The Northern Hemisphere summer heat wave of 2010 affected many areas across the Northern Hemisphere, especially parts of Northeastern China and European Russia.
- Starting in May 2010, records were being set. On 26 May, at Mohenjo-daro, Sindh province in Pakistan a national record high temperature of 53.5 °C (128.3 °F) occurred.
- In June 2010, Eastern Europe experienced very warm conditions. Ruse, Bulgaria hit 36.6 °C (97.9 °F) on the 13th making it the warmest spot in Europe. Other records broken on the 13th include Vidin, Bulgaria at 35.8 °C (96.4 °F), Sandanski, Bulgaria hitting 35.5 °C (95.9 °F), Lovech and Pazardzhik, Bulgaria at 35.1 °C (95.2 °F) as well as the capital, Sofia, hitting 33.3 °C (91.9 °F). The heat came from the Sahara desert and was not associated with rain. This helped the situation with high water levels in that part of the continent. On the 14th, several cities were once again above the 35 °C (95 °F) mark even though they did not break records. The only cities in Bulgaria breaking records were Musala peak hitting 15.2 °C (59.4 °F) and Elhovo hitting 35.6 °C (96.1 °F). On the 15th, Ruse, Bulgaria peaked at 37.2 °C (99.0 °F). Although it was not a record, this was the highest temperature recorded in the country. Five Bulgarian cities broke records that day: Ahtopol hit 28.6 °C (83.5 °F), Dobrich was 33.8 °C (92.8 °F), Karnobat hit 34 °C (93 °F), Sliven hit 35 °C (95 °F) and Elhovo recorded 36.1 °C (97.0 °F).
- From 4 to 9 July 2010, the majority of the American East Coast, from the Carolinas to Maine, was gripped in a severe heat wave. Philadelphia, New York, Baltimore, Washington, Raleigh, and even Boston eclipsed 38 °C (100 °F). Many records were broken, some of which dated back to the 19th century, including Wilmington, Delaware's temperature of 39 °C (103 °F) on Wednesday, 7 July, which broke the record of 36 °C (97 °F) from 1897. Philadelphia and New York eclipsed 38 °C (100 °F) for the first time since 2001. Frederick, Maryland, and Newark, New Jersey, among others exceeded 38 °C (100 °F) for four days in a row.

=== 2011 ===
- The 2011 North American heat wave brought record heat to the Midwestern United States, Eastern Canada, and much of the Eastern Seaboard.
- A record-breaking heat wave hit Southwestern Asia in late July and early August 2011, with temperatures in Iraq exceeding 49 °C (120 °F), and an "asphalt-melting, earth-parching, brain-scrambling heat of midsummer" in Tbilisi, Georgia. The Iraqis were further challenged by pressure to fast during Ramadan, despite heat of 51 °C (124 °F) in Baghdad and 52 °C (126 °F) in Diwaniya on 4 August. The extreme heat inspired conspiracy theories of the government corruption in Iraq and retaliation from the United States government; and, in Georgia, the Apocalypse, mutant locusts caused by Chernobyl, snakes imported by unseen enemies, and sun spots.
- Most parts of the United Kingdom experienced an exceptionally late heatwave between September and October 2011. The heat wave resulted in a new record high temperature for October at 29.9 °C (85.8 °F) set in Gravesend, Kent.

=== 2012 ===
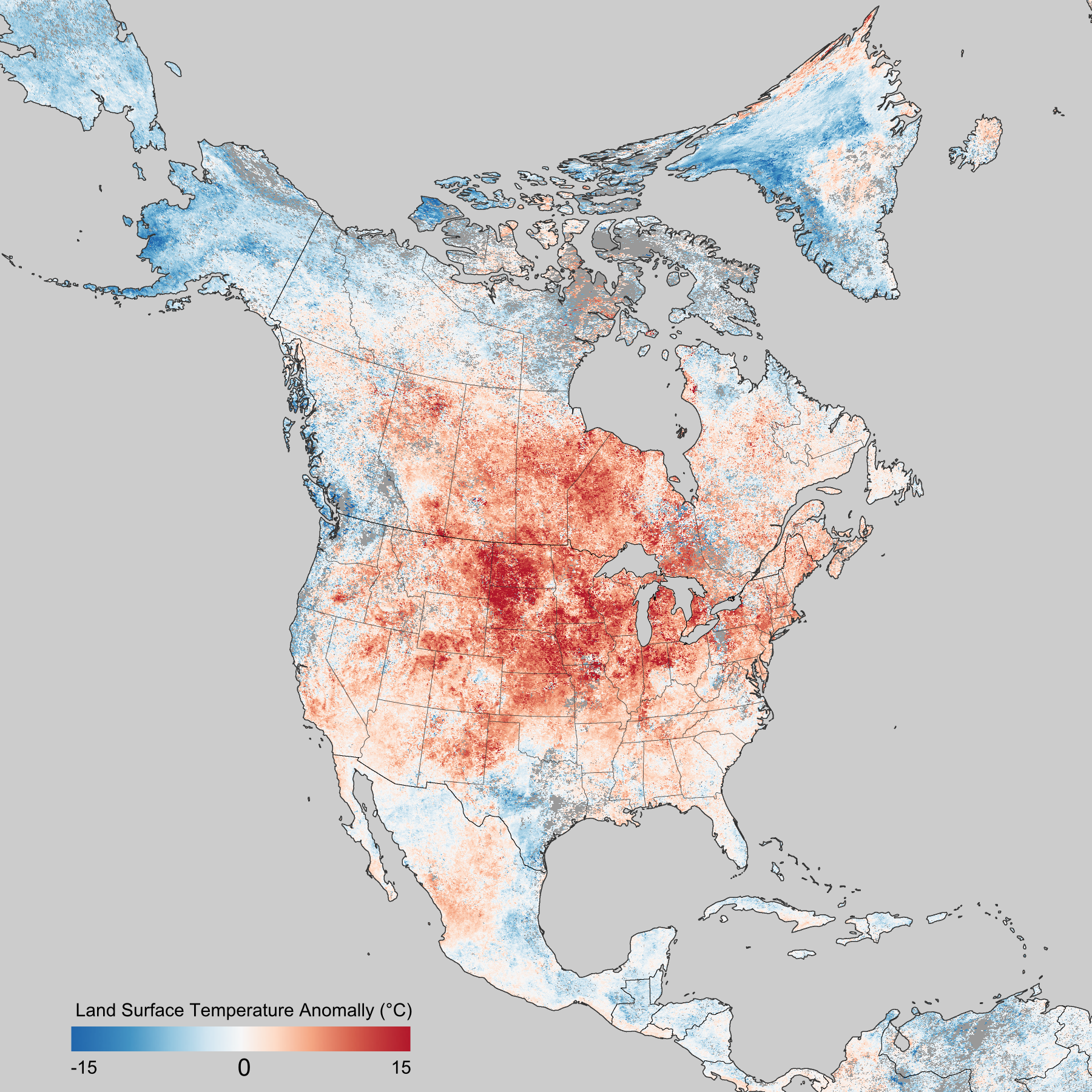
Land surface temperature anomalies of 8–15 March 2012. Land surface temperatures are distinct from the air temperatures that meteorological stations typically measure.

- In March 2012, the Midwest experienced one of the most anomalous and largest heat waves of all time.
- In late June 2012, much of North America began experiencing a heat wave, as heat spread east from the Rocky Mountains. During the heat wave, the June 2012 North American derecho (one within a series) caused violent storms that downed trees and power lines, leaving 3 million people in the eastern U. S. without power on 30 June. The heat lasted until mid-August in some parts of the country.

=== 2013 ===
- The Australian summer of 2012–2013, known as the Angry Summer or Extreme Summer, resulted in 123 weather records being broken over a 90-day period, including the hottest day ever recorded for Australia as a whole, the hottest January on record, the hottest summer average on record, and a record seven days in row when the whole continent averaged above 39 °C (102 °F). Single-day temperature record were broken in dozens of towns and cities, as well as single-day rainfall records, and several rivers flooded to new record highs. From 28 December 2012 through at least 9 January 2013 Australia has faced its most severe heatwave in over 80 years, with a large portion of the nation recording high temperature reading above 40 to 45 °C (104 to 113 °F) or greater in some areas, a couple of spots have also neared 50 °C (122 °F). This extreme heat has also resulted in a 'flash' drought across southern and central areas of the country and has sparked several massive wildfires due to periodic high winds.
- In late June 2013, an intense heat wave struck the Southwestern United States. Various places in Southern California reached up to 50 °C (122 °F). On 30 June, Death Valley, California hit 54.0 °C (129.2 °F) which is the hottest temperature ever recorded on Earth during the month of June. It was five degrees shy of the world record highest temperature measured in Death Valley, which was 57 °C (134 °F), recorded in July 1913.
- Around Canada Day 2013, the same heatwave that hit the Southwestern United States moved north and hit southern British Columbia, Washington and Oregon. Temperatures in BC hit 40 °C (104 °F) in Lytton on 1 July 2013, and on 2 July 2013, the city of Penticton hit 38 °C (100 °F), with both Summerland and Osoyoos hitting the same. The Tri-Cities in Washington were among the hottest, with temperatures around 43 °C (110 °F). Edmonton also reached 33 °C (91 °F), but humidex values soared to 44 °C (111 °F), sparking severe thunderstorms and golf ball sized hail that evening.
- In China from July to August 2013, the South continued to experience an unusually severe heat wave with exceptionally high temperatures. In multiple regions of Zhejiang, Chongqing, Shanghai, Hunan, and other areas the temperatures soared to over 40 degrees Celsius and lasted for a long time. Xinchang, Zhejiang endured extreme hot weather of 44.1 °C (111.4 °F), on 8 August Fenghua, Zhejiang reached a new all-time record high temperature of 43.5 °C (110.3 °F), Changsha, Hunan in July 2013 achieved a high temperature "Grand Slam", all 31 days in July set a new daily record high temperature of over 35 °C (95 °F). Hangzhou experienced 14 consecutive days over 40 °C (104 °F) while Xujiahui Station of Shanghai shattered 140 years of meteorological records to set a new all-time record high temperature of 40.8 °C (105.4 °F). Sustained high temperatures caused many people, especially the elderly to get heatstroke or sunstroke, seriously affecting millions of lives. Many areas throughout China endured record high temperatures resulting in multiple continuous meteorological departments issued high-temperature orange or red alerts. 2013 saw a wide range of abnormally hot temperatures not seen for the past 60 years of national meteorological records dating back to 1951.
- In July 2013, the United Kingdom experienced the hottest July since 2006. Overall July 2013 was the fourth hottest and fourth sunniest on record.
- The Argentina heatwave of 2013 was a historical phenomenon that occurred from 11 December 2013 to 2 January 2014 in the north and center of the country, as well as in northern Patagonia. It was the longest heat wave experienced in Argentina since records began in 1906 affecting many cities throughout the country. For the first time since the creation of the heat alarm system, a red level alert was issued for several days consecutive for both the city of Buenos Aires and the city of Rosario, which are the cities for which the National Meteorological Service conducts heat waves. From 11 December began to register a marked increase in temperatures, especially the maximum in a vast area of the central and northern Patagonian region, affecting southern Córdoba, southern Santa Fe, southern Entre Ríos, much of the province of Buenos Aires, La Pampa, east of Mendoza, east of Neuquén and Río Negro. From day 19 this anomalous situation began to expand towards the north of Argentina and returned to intensify on the central part, arriving to affect to 18 provinces, yielding the same towards 30 December in the central part and between 1 and 2 January in the extreme north of the country with the passage of a cold front that produced a change of mass of air. The long persistence of this heat wave (22 days), made the event an exceptional one, breaking several brands in regard to more consecutive days with minimum and maximum temperatures above the average in several meteorological stations of the affected zone. The National Meteorological Service communicated, through its daily reports, reports on the development of the heat wave. The strongest point of heat was registered in the city of Chamical, province of La Rioja with 45.5 °C (113.9 °F) in the city of Santiago del Estero (provincial capital) was 45 °C (113 °F) and in Buenos Aires (national capital) was 39 °C (102 °F). The extensive heat wave severely affected the health of thousands of people who needed medical assistance during those days, the historic heat wave caused at least 1,877 deaths in different points of the center and north of the country.
- From 28 December 2013 – 4 January 2014, Longreach, Queensland suffered through 8 days of temperatures soaring over 43.3 °C (109.9 °F) having broken numerous records

=== 2014 ===
TBA

=== 2015 ===
- Between April and May 2015, a heat wave occurred in India, killing more than 2,200 people in that country's different geographical regions. Daytime temperatures hovered between 45 and 47 °C (113 and 117 °F) in parts of two states over the weekend, 3–7 °C (5.4–12.6 °F) above normal. Andhra Pradesh was hardest hit, with 1,636 people dying from the heat since mid-April, a government statement said. A further 561 people have died in neighboring Telangana.
- In June 2015, a severe heat wave killed more than 2,500 people in Karachi, Pakistan.
- Between 28 June and 3 July 2015, in the Northwest United States, and southern British Columbia, a heat wave occurred.
- Between 30 June and 5 July 2015, a heat wave, brought upon by a Spanish plume, occurred in Western Europe, which pushed hot temperatures from Morocco to England. Temperatures in England reached 36.7 °C (98.1 °F), beating the previous July record from 2006 but the all-time record of 38.5 °C (101.3 °F) stayed unbeaten.
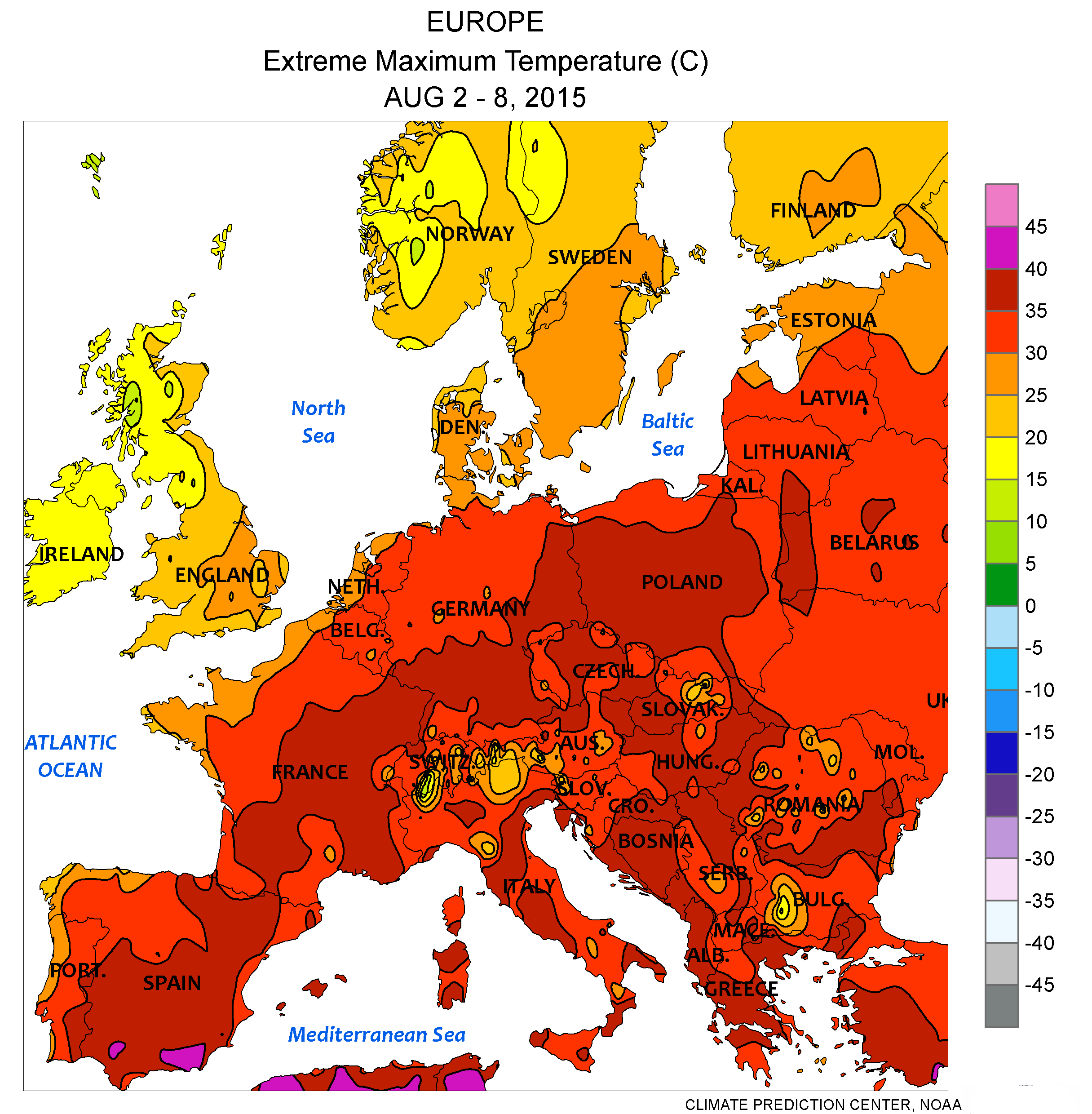
  Maximum temperatures from 2 to 8 August 2015. Dark red represents temperatures between 35 and 40 °C (95 and 104 °F).
- From late June to mid-September 2015, unusual and prolonged heat waves occurred across Europe. With temperatures above 40 °C (104 °F), new record temperatures have been measured since the start of weather recording in many locations. The Maghreb Mediterranean coast, south-western, central and south-eastern Europe experienced one of the biggest heat waves of recent decades.
- In August 2015, a heat wave affected much of the Middle East causing almost a hundred deaths in Egypt. Temperatures reached above 50 °C (122 °F) in Iraq and Qatar.

=== 2016 ===
2016 was the 2nd warmest year on record.

- During June 2016, record heat appeared in Arizona, southern Nevada, and southern California. Burbank, California, reached 44 °C (111 °F), Phoenix, Arizona, reached 48 °C (118 °F), Yuma, Arizona, reached 49 °C (120 °F) and Tucson, Arizona, reached 46 °C (115 °F), its warmest temperature in more than 20 years, on 19 June. Riverside, California, reached 46 °C (114 °F), Palm Springs, California, reached 50 °C (122 °F), Las Vegas, Nevada, reached 46 °C (115 °F), Death Valley reached 52 °C (126 °F), Needles, California, tied its all-time record high of 52 °C (125 °F) while Blythe, California, set a new all-time record high of 51 °C (124 °F) on 20 June.
- In July 2016, Mitribah, Kuwait reached 54 °C (129 °F) and Basra, Iraq reached 53.9 °C (129.0 °F). These are the highest temperatures ever recorded in the Eastern Hemisphere and on planet Earth outside of Death Valley.
- During September 2016, the United Kingdom experienced its hottest September day since 1911 with temperatures as high as 34.4 °C (93.9 °F) on the 13th. However, the all-time September record still stands at 35.6 °C (96.1 °F) from 1906.
- 2016 Indian heatwave was a record heatwave in April and May of that year. A national record high temperature of 51.0 °C (123.8 °F) was set in the town of Phalodi, in the state of Rajasthan. Over 160 people died with 330 million affected to some degree. There were also water shortages with drought worsening the impact of the heat wave. In India, the month of May is typically one of the hottest and driest. In 2016, the heat came early, with 111 heat-related casualties reported by 8 April 2016 the heat was coupled with drought which further devastation. Schools were shut down in Odisha and Telangana weeks ahead of summer holidays. Hospitals stopped performing surgeries. A ban on daytime (9 am – 6 pm) cooking was imposed to prevent accidental fires.
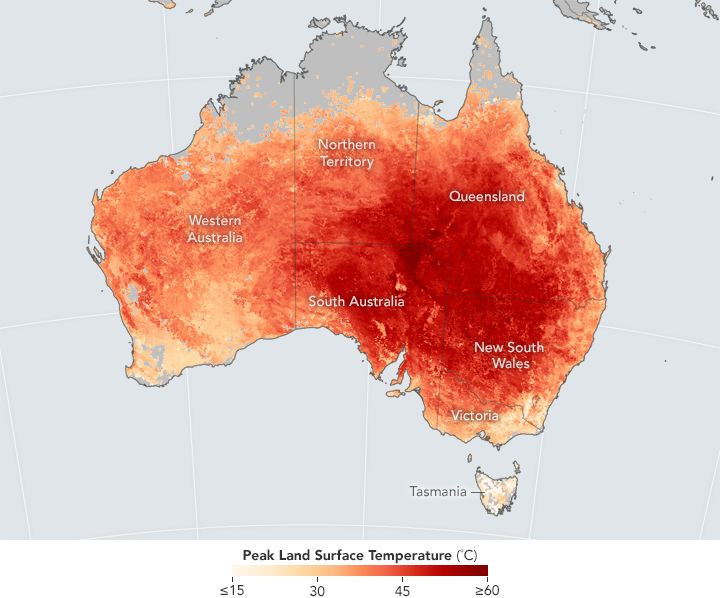
  Peak land surface temperatures from 7 to 14 February 2017, as mapped by satellite during the 2017 Australian heatwave.
- The 2016 Asian heat wave set temperature records in many Asian countries.
- The 2016 Southeast Asian heat wave set temperature records in most Southeast Asian countries.

=== 2017 ===
- From 25 to 27 January 2017, Chile experienced a period of intense heat, with temperatures peaking on 26 January. The event was concentrated between the Metropolitan Region of Santiago and La Araucanía Region, being more intense in the region of Maule and Biobío Region. The meteorological phenomenon broke the records of maximum temperatures ever recorded in the cities of Santiago, Chillán, Concepción and Quillón, the latter being the highest maximum temperature recorded nationwide since data exists: 44.9 °C (112.8 °F).
- In February 2017, Australia experienced an extreme heat wave with temperatures as high as 47.2 °C (117.0 °F) in Taree, New South Wales and 47.6 °C (117.7 °F) in Ivanhoe, New South Wales.
- In April 2017, a severe heat wave affected Pakistan, with temperatures peaking at 51.0 °C (123.8 °F).
- In June 2017 again, a heatwave in Iran broke record high temperature. On 28 June 2017, the city of Jask had a dew point of 33 °C (91.4 °F) degrees, which is rare. Combined with the high air temperature, the heat index was 69 °C (156 °F). But the highest temperature in Ahvaz soared to 54 °C (129.2 °F) degrees and the humidity created a heat index of 61 °C (142 °F).
- Also, on 21 June 2017, the United Kingdom experienced a heat wave where temperatures reached the hottest since 28 June 1976, hitting 34.5˚C at London Heathrow Airport.
- 29 June 2017, Greece heat wave - hot air mass from Sahara Desert extended to the Balkans resulting in temperatures of 42˚C to 45˚C for three consecutive days.
- In September 2017 a heat wave affected a large portion of the Eastern United States; it is notable for producing unusually hot temperatures the latest in a calendar year in places. The heat wave also affected parts of Eastern Canada.

=== 2018 ===
- In May and June 2018, a heat wave affected Pakistan and a significant portion of India. At least 65 people have died due to the heat as of 28 May. Temperatures have reached as high as 48 °C (118 °F). The health dangers to a large part of the population are exacerbated by the then-ongoing Ramadan fast.
- 2018 British Isles heat wave. In April 2018, a heat wave affected the United Kingdom and Ireland. A brief cooling interlude in early May, and temperatures rose again to 25–30 °C (77–86 °F) for the rest of May and into June. In July 2018, many areas of the UK saw temperatures exceed 30 degrees for nine days in a row and fifteen days overall, and other areas still affected by a heat wave. The hot weather continued into early August before temperatures returned closer to the average during the second half of the month.
- 2018 North American heat wave. The heat wave started in Mexico in late May 2018. By June 2018, the Mexican government issued a state of emergency to more than 300 municipalities. In early July 2018, the heat wave in Quebec, Canada caused about 74 deaths. In July, the heat wave in Southern California caused many power outages, where over 34,000 Los Angeles customers serviced by LADWP had no power for over one week. In southwestern states such as Arizona and Colorado were above 38 °C (100 °F).
- 2018 Japan heat wave. In mid-July 2018, the heat wave in Japan arrived after a major flood. It caused over 22,000 hospitalizations and 80 deaths.
- 2018 European drought and heat waves. Much of Europe experienced above-average temperatures and drought, which resulted in wildfires in Sweden and wildfires in Greece.

=== 2019 ===
- Australian heat wave
  - From 25 December 2018, Australia was faced with constant record-breaking heatwaves with few breaks. December 2018 was recorded as the hottest December on record, while New South Wales had their warmest January since 2011. Adelaide recorded its hottest day on record on 24 January, surpassing the previous record from 1939, reaching 46.6 °C (115.9 °F) at 3:36 pm local time, and many settlements across South Australia set new records the same day. At least one man, 90 feral horses and 2,000 bats died, while 25,000 homes lost power.
  - Melbourne was forecast to have its hottest day since the 2009 Black Saturday bushfires on 25 January with a forecast of 44 °C (111 °F) (although the CBD's temperature did not reach the forecasted maximum, Melbourne Airport's temperature reached 46 °C (115 °F)), while over 200,000 homes across Victoria lost power due to load shedding. On 25 January Melbourne had its hottest day of either January or February: 43 °C (109.4 °F).
  - On 25 January the temperature of the Treasure Coast reached 45.0 °C (113 °F).
- In late May 2019, an unusually strong early-season heat wave affected the southeastern United States, breaking all-time May record high temperatures in several cities. Many locations also broke the record for the earliest-in-season 38 °C (100 °F) temperature.
- Also in late May, an early-season heat wave affected parts of Japan. The town of Saroma in Hokkaido reached 39.5 °C (103.1 °F), the highest May temperature ever recorded anywhere in Japan.
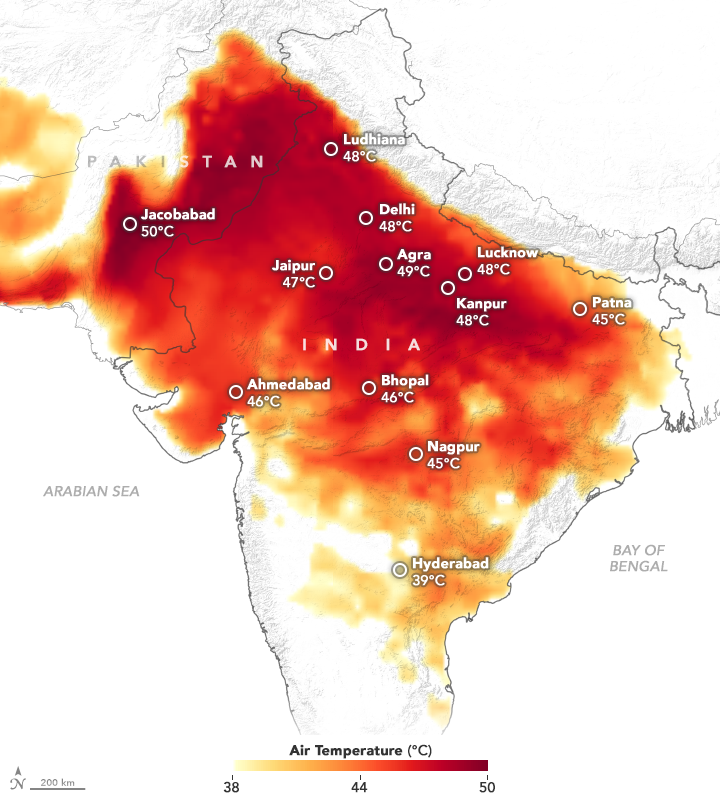
  Air temperatures in India and Pakistan during the 2019 heat wave
- The 2019 Indo-Pakistani heat wave reached a near record high temperature of 50.8 °C (123.4 °F) in Churu. The Indian and Pakistani media reported dozens of deaths due to the heat wave.
- 2019 European heat wave: Starting from 25 June, very hot air masses from the Sahara desert moved over Europe, leading to heat advisories in several European countries, including France, Germany and the UK. The extent and intensity of the heat wave was unusual for its earliness in the summer season. In France, numerous cities broke the old all-time national record of 44.1 °C (111.4 °F) set in Conqueyrac in 2003. The final new record was higher by 2 °C (3.6 °F). One month later, a similar event occurred, which also broke high temperature records in cities across several northwestern European countries. All-time national heat records were broken by 2.1 °C (3.8 °F) in the Netherlands, 3 °C (5.4 °F) in Belgium, 2.9 °C (5.2 °F) in Luxembourg, 2.1 °C (3.8 °F) in Germany and by 0.2 °C (0.36 °F) in the United Kingdom. On 27 August, the Royal Netherlands Meteorological Institute (KNMI) officially confirmed that the Netherlands were experiencing yet another heat wave when a temperature of 30 °C (86 °F) was measured in De Bilt at 12.40. It was the fourth time ever since recordings began in 1901 that the country experienced two national heat waves in a single year. The same day, the Royal Meteorological Institute (KMI/IRM) declared the third heat wave of 2019 in Belgium. Since official temperature readings began, it has happened only once before (in 1947) that three heat waves were detected in a single year.
- A prolonged drought and heat wave affected the eastern United States from September to October 2019. September was one of the warmest and driest on record in many locations. All-time record high temperatures for October were also broken in numerous cities.
- A heatwave in Australia occurred in December 2019 with a record average temperature across the country of 40.9 °C (105.6 °F) on the 17th. This was surpassed on 18 December by an average temperature of 41.9 °C (107.4 °F). The prior record was from 2013 at 40.3 °C (104.5 °F). The heat exacerbated the 2019–20 Australian bushfire season.

=== 2020 ===
- On 4 January, Canberra and Penrith in Australia smashed their all time records, reaching 44.0 °C (111.2 °F) and 48.9 °C (120.0 °F) respectively. Penrith was the hottest place anywhere on Earth that day.
- A late spring heat wave hit Northern New England and Eastern Canada: On 27 May, Montreal broke its all-time May record high, reaching 36.6 °C (97.9 °F), which was also the second-highest temperature ever recorded in the city. Nearby Ottawa and Burlington, Vermont reached 35 °C (95 °F) on the same day. In mid-June, a second heat wave hit the same regions. Montreal and Burlington reached 32 °C (90 °F) for 6 consecutive days, one of the longest streaks on record in these locations. In New Brunswick, numerous cities broke all-time June record highs, with the hot spots Bathurst and Miramichi hitting 37.2 °C (99.0 °F). Caribou, Maine tied its all-time record high of 36 °C (96 °F) on 19 June. The heat wave, combined with abnormally dry conditions, led to numerous forest fires in the province of Quebec. The heat wave continued into July, where Toronto, Ottawa, and Montreal recorded their second hottest July on record.
- Siberia heat wave: A Russian heat wave smashed an all-time record high in one Siberian town on 20 June, reaching 38 °C (100 °F) possibly the hottest temperature on record so far north in the Arctic, continuing an off-the-charts warm year in what is typically one of coldest places on Earth. If that reading is found to be correct, that would break the town's all-time record of 37.3 °C (99.1 °F) set on 25 July 1988. Temperature records in Verkhoyansk date to 1885.
- United Kingdom heat wave: After a relatively cool July, temperatures reached to 37.8 °C (100.0 °F) on the 31st at London Heathrow Airport, now the fifth hottest temperature on record and the third hottest at the time of recording. After a brief return to average temperatures, Heathrow Airport and Kew Gardens rose to 36.4 °C (97.5 °F) on 7 August, at the time the ninth hottest temperature on record, and a temperature of at least 34.0 °C (93.2 °F) was recorded somewhere in the UK for six consecutive days. 36.2 °C (97.2 °F) was again reached near Crawley, West Sussex on the 11th. Five "tropical nights", nights that record a minimum temperature of 20.0 °C (68.0 °F) or higher, were recorded during the heatwave, these being the 8th, 10th, 11th, 12th and 13th. Torrential downpours and thunderstorms after the heatwave brought flash-flooding to vulnerable regions, and despite the typically dry nature of European heat waves, 2020 was overall the fifth wettest summer on record.
- Western United States: There was a period of intense heat throughout the Western and Midwestern United States, starting in early mid-August. Death Valley reached 54.4 °C (129.9 °F) on 16 August, the highest temperature since a reported 57 °C (134 °F) at the same location in July 1913. If this temperature is verified, it will be one of the highest temperatures recorded on earth.
- According to a Japan Meteorological Agency official confirmed report, a high temperature of 41.1 °C (106.0 °F) was recorded in Hamamatsu, Shizuoka Prefecture, Japan, on 17 August, which was the highest temperature record since the first operation of local observation on 1 December 1882. In Japan, many places experienced a heatwave from late June to early September, including 40.5 °C (104.9 °F) in Isesaki and Kiryu, both in Gunma Prefecture, on 11 August; a total of 1,528 people died of heatstroke from heatwave, according to the Japan Health, Welfare and Labour Ministry.

=== 2021 ===
- Around mid-February, a jet-stream of Sahara dust brought a winter heatwave in Europe with daily temperatures nearly similar to max high during spring. In Berlin, a high temperature of 20 °C (68 °F) was reported on Wednesday and the next day it reached 19 °C (66 °F). Paris reported the same high temperature of 20 °C (68 °F) while Warsaw and London had it around 18 °C (64 °F). In Asia, a record-high winter temperature was declared in Beijing on 21 February at 25.6 °C (78.1 °F).
- On 20 May, the May record 31.9 °C (89.4 °F) was reported north of the Arctic Circle at 67.6° North, 53° East. On 20 June, the land surface temperature had widely exceeded 35 °C (95 °F) across Siberia. The 2021 Russia heatwave and drought caused the 2021 Siberia wildfires.
- From 3 to 6 June the northern Great Plains and southern Canadian Prairies experienced a heat wave. On 4 June, Gretna, Manitoba, reached a temperature of 41.3 °C (106.3 °F), the highest recorded temperature in Manitoba since the 1980s and the earliest in the year occurrence of above 40 °C (104 °F) temperatures in Canada.
- In mid-June, record temperatures were recorded in multiple parts of the Southwestern United States, reaching a maximum of 53 °C (128 °F) at Death Valley, California, on 17 June.
- In late June, the 2021 Western North America heat wave occurred, causing temperatures to soar above 38 °C (100 °F) in the Pacific Northwest. All-time record high temperatures were recorded in cities such as Portland 47 °C (116 °F) and Seattle 42 °C (108 °F). Lytton, British Columbia, reached 49.6 °C (121.3 °F), surpassing the day prior 47.9 °C (118.2 °F), which had exceeded the all-time high temperature ever recorded in Canada.
- From 18 June to 18 July in Kouvola Finland, the Finnish heat wave record broke: already 31 consecutive heat days came full.
- In the last week of July, a heat wave began in Turkey, Greece, Italy and other countries in the region. On 11 August, 48.8 °C (119.8 °F), the highest temperature ever in Europe, was recorded in Floridia, Sicily.
- In July, a heat wave combined with drought, low natural gas production, and COVID-19 delays to cause widespread power outages across the Middle East, with protests in Iraq, Iran, and Lebanon.

=== 2022 ===
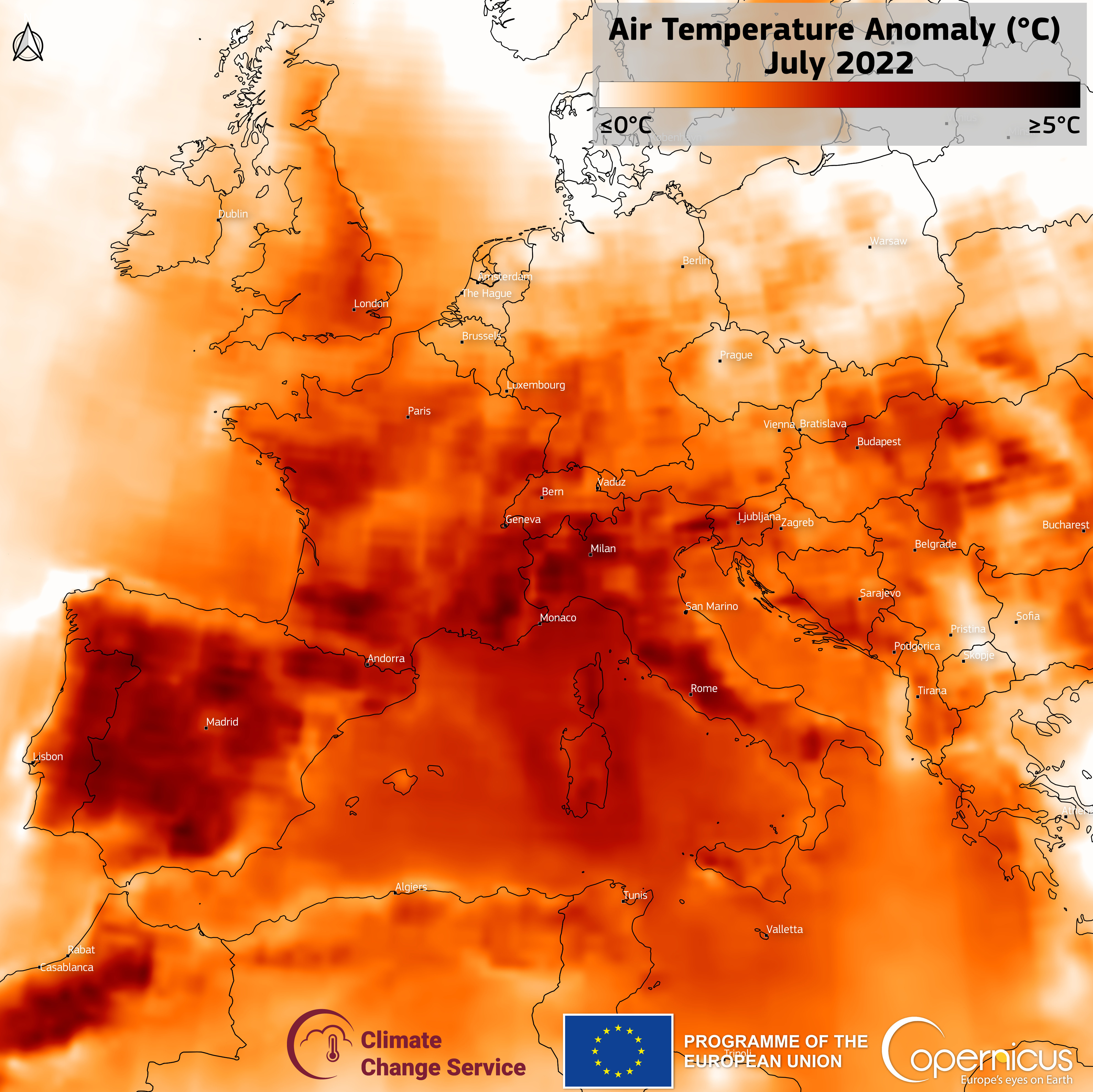
A temperature anomaly map of Europe in July 2022

- During mid-January 2022, several countries of South America, including Argentina, certain parts of Brazil, Paraguay, and Uruguay, experienced a record-breaking heat wave, with temperatures over 44 °C (111 °F) and with Argentina being the most affected country.
- During the second week of February 2022, multiple cities in California, including San Francisco, Sacramento, Los Angeles, and San Diego experienced a record-breaking heat wave with temperatures over 24 °C (75 °F) and with Palm Springs being the most affected city.
- Starting in late March 2022, India began experiencing one of the hottest March–April periods on record.
- A major heat wave affected the United States throughout May. Three residents in a senior building died on 14 May in Chicago due to the intense heat, because the AC wouldn't turn on. On 19 May in Memphis, as temperatures soared to near record highs of 33 °C (91 °F), a toddler died after being left in a car. On 21 May, intense heat surged into the Mid-Atlantic, causing a near record hot Preakness Stakes, with Baltimore and Philadelphia hitting 35 °C (95 °F), and temperatures of 33 °C (92 °F) in Washington DC, and 32 °C (90 °F) in New York City.
- During mid-June 2022, a record-breaking heat wave affected half of the United States. Record-high temperatures were set from California to Texas on 13 June. On 14 June, dangerous heat spread to the Midwest, South, and the Plains. On 15 June, St. Louis reached a record-tying temperature of 38 °C (101 °F).
- In late June 2022, Japan saw the worst heatwave in 150 years.
- The 2022 European heat waves affected much of Western Europe and the United Kingdom. Temperatures in Spain reached 45.7 °C (114.3 °F). The highest temperature recorded was 47.0 °C (116.6 °F) in Pinhão, Portugal, on 14 July. The United Kingdom saw the first red extreme heat warning to ever be issued in the country, causing it to be declared a national emergency on 15 July. A report from the Met Office suggests that temperatures may have reached 40.3 °C (104.5 °F) at Coningsby on 19 July, which is the first time the United Kingdom has exceeded 40 °C (104 °F). Ireland also recorded its hottest day since 1887 with temperatures exceeding 33.1 °C (91.6 °F) in Dublin. Unconfirmed temperatures of over 35 °C (95 °F) were also recorded in other parts of the country.
- China suffered several heat waves in 2022.

=== 2023 ===
2023's June–July–August season was the warmest on record globally by a large margin, as El Niño conditions continued to develop.

September 2023 was the warmest September on record globally, with an average surface air temperature 0.5 °C above the temperature of the previous warmest September (2020).

- During mid-April 2023, heat waves occurred in several countries in South Asia, Indochina, and parts of China. In what has been described as the "worst April heatwave in Asian history", several cities in the region have reported record temperatures. In Luang Prabang, Laos, temperatures reached 42.7 °C (108.9 °F), the highest in Laos' recorded history, while neighboring Thailand reached a record-tying 44.6 °C (112.3 °F). At least 13 people died in Maharashtra state, India, as a result of heatstroke. In May, Vietnam recorded its highest ever temperature of 44.1 °C (111.4 °F).
- A heat wave affected the Pacific Northwest region of North America in May 2023.
- Starting on 10 July 2023, a record-breaking heat wave affected many European countries, with effects felt most severely in Greece, Italy, Spain, and parts of Southeast Europe. The extreme weather event became named "Cerberus" after the hounds of Hades from Greek mythology by the Italian Meteorological Society. A new heatwave in the third week of July 2023 was then called Charon. In Greek mythology, Charon or Kharon (/ˈkɛərɒn, -ən/ KAIR-on, -ən; Ancient Greek: Χάρων) is a psychopomp, the ferryman of Hades, the Greek underworld.
- September 2023 European heatwave: From the beginning of September, much of western Europe experienced unseasonably high temperatures. The UK recorded seven consecutive days above 30.2 °C (86.4 °F), beating the previous longest run in September of four days. Temperatures peaked at 33.5 °C (92.3 °F) at Faversham, Kent. Temperatures in France were unseasonably high too with Paris recording 36.5 °C (97.7 °F), a new all-time record for the month. Ireland experienced its second warmest September on record, behind only September 2021. Temperatures reached into the high 20s in parts of southern Ireland, with temperatures in the low 30s recorded in parts of the Midland Region.

=== 2024 ===
Human-caused climate change increased the probability of the 2024 Middle East (West Asia) heatwave by about a factor of 5 (center chart vs. left chart).

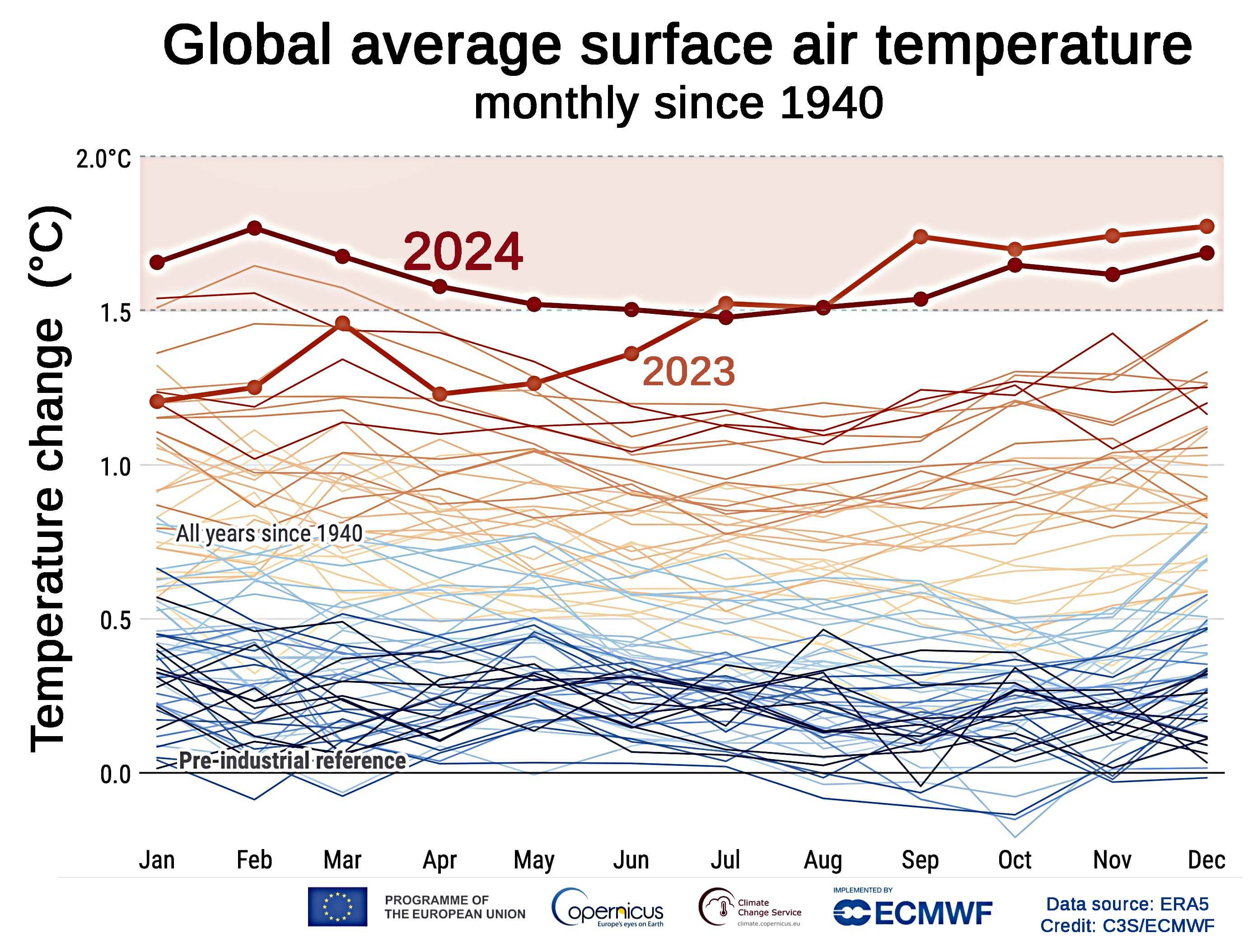
In 2024, Earth saw the highest average annual surface air temperature ever recorded, outpacing 2023 on an average basis.

- Since March 2024, severe heat waves impacted Mexico, the Southern United States, and Central America, leading to dozens of broken temperature records, mass deaths of animals from several threatened species, water shortages requiring rationing, increased forest fires, and over 48 deaths in Mexico with over 950 people suffering from heat-related ailments.
- In April 2024 Southeast Asia faced a severe heatwave, resulting in unprecedented high temperatures of up to 38.8 °C (101.8 °F) that caused school closures and prompted urgent health advisories throughout the region.
- In April 2024 Bangladesh and neighbouring region faced facing severe heatwaves. Schools and other institutions were closed due to severe heat across Bangladesh for the first time in history. On 30 April the temperature in Joshore reached up to 43.8 °C (110.8 °F). Pitch in roads started melting in the western region due to scorching heat. Many heat related deaths were recorded across the country.
- 2024 Indian heat wave – In May–June 2024, the longest heat wave occurred in India and Pakistan with a new record temperature for India's capital New Delhi of 49 °C (120 °F) (an even higher record of 53 °C (127 °F) had initially been reported in New Delhi on 29 May but was later found to be attributable to a faulty sensor), and temperatures in Pakistan getting as high as 52.2 °C (126.0 °F).
- 2024 European heatwaves – In mid-June 2024, Greece experienced a heatwave, Europe's first heatwave of the year. Temperatures in Greece were forecast to reach to 43 °C (109 °F). Turkey was also affected with temperatures hitting 44 °C (111 °F).
- In mid-June, high temperatures in Mecca, characterized as a heat wave, resulted in the deaths of pilgrims in the city for Hajj from countries including Indonesia, Jordan, Tunisia, and India. It was reported that as many as 1300 people may have died. Saudi authorities said most who died were not officially authorized to perform Hajj. Forecasts predicted temperatures as high as 45 °C (113 °F) on 19 June 2024. The heat also impacted Kuwait, where heightened demand caused officials at the Ministry of Electricity, Water and Renewable Energy to temporarily stop distribution of electricity to portions of the nation.
- 2024 Pakistan heat wave – In June 2024, Pakistan experienced a heat wave. The Edhi Foundation in Karachi said it transported a higher-than-normal number of bodies to the morgue during the period of 20 to 25 June.
- During the 2024 Summer Olympics, host city Paris, along with portions of Southern France and England, experienced a heatwave.
- 2024 Japan heatwaves – At least 59 heat-related deaths were recorded in Japan, with at least 62 temperature observation posts across Japan breaking temperature records in July 2024. According to the Japan Meteorological Agency (JMA), the average temperatures reached during the heatwaves represented the hottest for Japan in April and July since its record-keeping began in 1898.
- In December 2024, a heat wave occurred in Australia.

=== 2025 ===
- In January 2025, a heatwave struck much of Australia. Temperatures in Melbourne reached 41 °C (106 °F), and fire bans were issued for much of Victoria. Fish were observed dying on the coast of Western Australia between Ningaloo Reef and Broome.
- 2025 India–Pakistan heat wave in South Asia (April)
- In May 2025, a heat wave occurred for much of the United States and parts of Canada. A record May high temperature of 36 °C (96 °F) was recorded in International Falls, Minnesota, on 11 May 2025. Record-breaking temperatures especially occurred in Texas, with Del Rio reaching a record high of 43 °C (109 °F) on 13 May 2025 and with San Antonio reaching 39 °C (102 °F) on 14 May 2025.
- In May to October 2025, 2025 South Korean heatwaves.
- In summer 2025, Japan experienced a "prolonged extreme heat wave", including the highest temperature ever recorded in Japan of 41.8 °C (107.2 °F) in Isesaki on 5 August 2025, and mean surface air temperatures 2.36 °C (4.25 °F) above baseline, far exceeding 2023 and 2024.
- From 22 to 25 June, a major heat wave hit the Eastern United States. On 24 June, both JFK International Airport and Islip, New York set new records for highest June temperature; the JFK record was repeated on 25 June. Montreal also saw its warmest June temperature on record on 24 June, with Boston setting a record for the entire New England region. The extreme heat caused a fatality in Missouri. Monthly record warm minimum temperatures stretched as far west as Cheyenne, Wyoming.
- In July 2025, 2025 European heatwaves.

=== 2026 ===
- In late January 2026, a heat wave struck Argentina, along with dry weather, threatening livestock as well as soy and corn crops. Temperatures in the country hit 40 °C (104 °F).
- Starting on 24 January 2026 and ending 30 January 2026, a record-breaking heat dome struck much of Australia, including the states of Victoria, South Australia, and New South Wales. Temperatures as high as 50 °C (122 °F) were reported. A heat dome covered south Eastern Australia during Late December 2025 and January 2026.
- In March 2026, a heat wave struck some parts of the southwestern and central United States, including Los Angeles, Tucson and Phoenix.
- May 2026 United Kingdom heatwave: In late May 2026, a heatwave occurred across most of the UK, including a new record high temperature for May at 34.8 °C (94.6 °F), recorded at Kew Gardens. Heatwave conditions were met in some places on Sunday 24 May, with most other places meeting the heatwave criteria.
- The 2026 European heatwaves began in May.
- May: heatwave (earlier than in other years) in India and Pakistan, especially in North India, Central India, and the arid region around Rajasthan. About 45 °C (113 °F), sometimes even hotter.
- On May 19, 2026, monthly high temperature records were set at Philadelphia and tied at Newark, New Jersey and Reading, Pennsylvania.
- The 2026 North American heat wave began in late June. The National Weather Service issued heat advisories; nearly half of the United States population, 180 million people, face "major" or "extreme" heat risk. Temperatures were forecasted to reach between 38–43 °C (100–110 °F) in many areas.
- A heat wave hit Japan between July 20-25, killing three lions in a Tokyo zoo.
- A heat wave hit South Korea with temperatures from 40–42 °C (104–108 °F) from 27 July to 3 August. The South Korean President Lee Jae Myung designated the city of Andong and 4 townships in Uiseong County, North Gyeongsang Province to be special disaster zones after record floods in during the July monsoon season after the particularly strong heat wave. 641 temporary houses have been built foe evacuees. Potato harvests were badly reduced by the fire.

== See also ==
- List of named heat waves
- List of cold waves
- List of Indian heat waves
- List of marine heatwaves
- List of severe weather phenomena
- 2026 North American heat wave
- 2026 European heatwaves
- 2026 United Kingdom heatwaves
