= China heat wave =

China heat wave may refer to

- 2022 China heat wave
- 2023 China heat wave
