= United Kingdom weather records =

Extremes in British meteorology

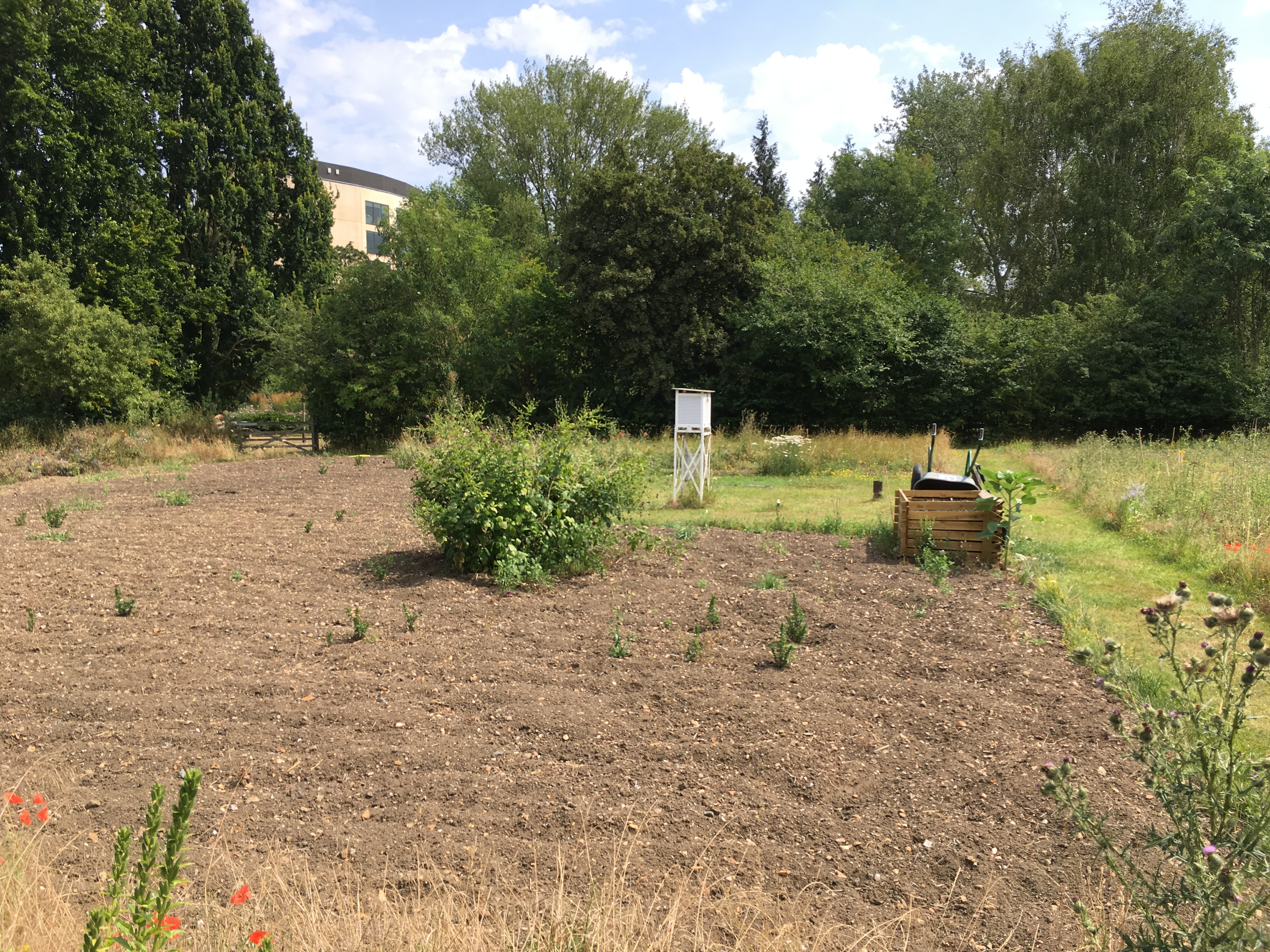
Cambridge Botanic Garden Weather Station where a temperature of 38.7 °C (101.7 °F) was recorded in the 2019 European heat wave

The United Kingdom weather records show the most extreme weather ever recorded in the United Kingdom, such as temperature, wind speed, and rainfall records. Reliable temperature records for the whole of the United Kingdom go back to about 1880.

== Records ==
Daily records unless otherwise specified are from 0900-2100 UTC. As of 13 August 2026, the records, as recorded by the Met Office, are:

=== Temperature and sunshine records ===
==== Highest temperature by constituent country ====
Constituent country	Temperature	Date	Place(s)
England	40.3 °C (104.5 °F)	19 July 2022	Coningsby, Lincolnshire
Wales	37.1 °C (98.8 °F)	18 July 2022	Hawarden, Flintshire
Scotland	34.8 °C (94.6 °F)	19 July 2022	Charterhall, Scottish Borders
Northern Ireland	31.3 °C (88.3 °F)	21 July 2021	Castlederg, County Tyrone

Earlier records for England/UK since 1911 are shown with a * in the "Top 10 hottest days" table below.

==== Top 10 hottest days by maximum temperatures recorded in the UK ====
Rank	Temperature	Date	Place(s)	Notes
1 *	40.3 °C (104.5 °F)	19 July 2022 (Note: Signifies the then-highest temperature recorded up to that date, until surpassed by the next starred date above.)	Coningsby, Lincolnshire	Part of the 2022 heatwave
2 *	38.7 °C (101.7 °F)	25 July 2019	Cambridge, Cambridgeshire	Part of the 2019 heatwave
3 *	38.5 °C (101.3 °F)	10 August 2003	Faversham, Kent	Part of the 2003 heatwave
4=	38.2 °C (100.8 °F)	18 July 2022	Pitsford, Northamptonshire	Part of the aforementioned 2022 heatwave
4=	38.2 °C (100.8 °F)	13 August 2026	Hartpury College, Gloucestershire	Part of the 2026 heatwave
6	38.0 °C (100.4 °F)	26 June 2026	Lingwood, Norfolk	Part of the aforementioned 2026 heatwave
7	37.8 °C (100.0 °F)	31 July 2020	London Heathrow Airport, Greater London	
8	37.3 °C (99.1 °F)	25 June 2026	Yeovilton, Somerset	Part of the aforementioned 2026 heatwave
9 *	37.1 °C (98.8 °F)	3 August 1990	Cheltenham, Gloucestershire	Part of the 1990 heatwave
10= *	36.7 °C (98.1 °F)	9 August 1911	Raunds, Northamptonshire	Part of the 1911 heatwave
10=	36.7 °C (98.1 °F)	1 July 2015	London Heathrow Airport, Greater London	

==== Hottest days by month of the year ====
Month	Temperature	Date	Place(s)
January	19.9 °C (67.8 °F)	28 January 2024	Achfary, Sutherland
February	21.2 °C (70.2 °F)	26 February 2019	Kew Gardens, London
March	25.6 °C (78.1 °F)	29 March 1968	Mepal, Cambridgeshire
April	29.4 °C (84.9 °F)	16 April 1949	Camden Square, London
May	35.1 °C (95.2 °F)	26 May 2026	Kew Gardens, London
June	38.0 °C (100.4 °F)	26 June 2026	Lingwood, Norfolk
July	40.3 °C (104.5 °F)	19 July 2022	Coningsby, Lincolnshire
August	38.5 °C (101.3 °F)	10 August 2003	Faversham, Kent
September	35.6 °C (96.1 °F)	2 September 1906	Bawtry, South Yorkshire
October	29.9 °C (85.8 °F)	1 October 2011	Gravesend, Kent
November	22.4 °C (72.3 °F)	1 November 2015	Trawsgoed, Ceredigion
December	18.7 °C (65.7 °F)	28 December 2019	Achfary, Sutherland

==== Coldest days by month of the year ====
Month	Temperature	Date	Place(s)
January	−27.2 °C (−17.0 °F)	10 January 1982	Braemar, Aberdeenshire
February	−27.2 °C (−17.0 °F)	11 February 1895	Braemar, Aberdeenshire
March	−22.8 °C (−9.0 °F)	14 March 1958	Logie Coldstone, Aberdeenshire
April	−15.6 °C (3.9 °F)	2 April 1917	Eskdalemuir, Dumfries and Galloway
May	−9.4 °C (15.1 °F)	4 May 1941	Lynford, Norfolk
May	−9.4 °C (15.1 °F)	11 May 1941	Lynford, Norfolk
May	−9.4 °C (15.1 °F)	15 May 1941	Fort Augustus, Highland
June	−5.6 °C (21.9 °F)	9 June 1955	Dalwhinnie, Highland
June	−5.6 °C (21.9 °F)	1 June 1962	Santon Downham, Norfolk
June	−5.6 °C (21.9 °F)	3 June 1962	Santon Downham, Norfolk
July	−2.5 °C (27.5 °F)	15 July 1977	Lagganlia, Highland
July	−2.5 °C (27.5 °F)	9 July 1986	St Harmon, Radnorshire
August	−4.5 °C (23.9 °F)	21 August 1973	Lagganlia, Highland
September	−6.7 °C (19.9 °F)	26 September 1942	Dalwhinnie, Highland
October	−11.7 °C (10.9 °F)	28 October 1948	Dalwhinnie, Highland
November	−23.3 °C (−9.9 °F)	14 November 1919	Braemar, Aberdeenshire
December	−27.2 °C (−17.0 °F)	30 December 1995	Altnaharra, Highland

==== Lowest temperature by constituent country ====
Constituent Nation	Temperature	Date	Place(s)
Scotland	−27.2 °C (−17.0 °F)	11 February 1895 and 10 January 1982	Braemar, Aberdeenshire
Scotland	−27.2 °C (−17.0 °F)	30 December 1995	Altnaharra, Sutherland
England	−26.1 °C (−15.0 °F)	10 January 1982	Newport, Shropshire
Wales	−23.3 °C (−9.9 °F)	21 January 1940	Rhayader, Radnorshire
Northern Ireland	−18.7 °C (−1.7 °F)	24 December 2010	Castlederg, County Tyrone

==== Most hours of sunshine ====
Record	Duration	Location	Date
Highest monthly total (UK national average)	266 hours	UK (national average)	May 2020
Highest monthly total (England)	383.9 hours	Eastbourne, Sussex	July 1911
Highest monthly total (Northern Ireland)	301.3 hours	Magilligan, County Londonderry	May 2025
Highest monthly total (Scotland)	329.1 hours	Tiree, Argyll & Bute	May 1975
Highest monthly total (Wales)	354.3 hours	Dale Fort, Pembrokeshire	July 1955

=== Rainfall records ===
==== Most rainfall in periods of time ====
Duration	Amount	Place(s)	Date
Short Durations
Highest 5-min total	32 mm (1.3 in)	Preston, Lancashire	10 August 1893
Highest 30-min total	80 mm (3.1 in)	Eskdalemuir, Dumfries and Galloway	26 June 1953
Highest 60-min total	92 mm (3.6 in)	Maidenhead, Berkshire	12 July 1901
Highest 90-min total	117 mm (4.6 in)	Dunsop Valley, Lancashire	8 August 1967
Highest 120-min total	193 mm (7.6 in) (Note: The UK Met Office expresses "reservations" about 193 mm on 19 May 1989 at Walshaw Dean Lodge (West Yorkshire). The next highest acceptable value is 155 mm on 11 June 1956 at Hewenden Reservoir (West Yorkshire).)	Walshaw Dean Lodge, West Yorkshire	19 May 1989
Highest 155-min total	169 mm (6.7 in)	Hampstead, Greater London	14 August 1975
Highest 180-min total	178 mm (7.0 in)	Horncastle, Lincolnshire	7 October 1960
Highest total in any 24-hour period	341.4 mm (13.44 in)	Honister Pass, Cumbria	4 December 2015 1800 UTC - 5 December 2015 1800 UTC
Consecutive Rainfall Days (0900 UTC - 0900 UTC)
Highest 1-day total	279 mm (11.0 in)	Martinstown, Dorset	18 July 1955
Highest 1-day total (UK national average)	31.7 mm (1.25 in)	UK (national average)	3 October 2020
Highest 2-day total	405 mm (15.9 in)	Thirlmere, Cumbria	4 to 5 December 2015
Highest 3-day total	456.4 mm (17.97 in)	Seathwaite, Cumbria	17 to 19 November 2009
Highest 4-day total	495 mm (19.5 in)	Seathwaite, Cumbria	16 to 19 November 2009
Highest monthly total	1,396.4 mm (54.98 in)	Crib Goch, Snowdon	1 to 31 December 2015
Highest annual total	6,527 mm (257.0 in)	Sprinkling Tarn, Cumbria	1 January to 31 December 1954

=== Wind records ===
==== Highest wind speed ====
Ground Level	Wind speed			Location	Date
Ground Level	mph	km/h	knots	Location	Date
Low level (up to 500 m)	142	228	123	Fraserburgh, Aberdeenshire	13 February 1989
High level (above 500 m)	173	278	150	Cairn Gorm, Scottish Highlands	20 March 1986

Shetland holds the unofficial British record for wind speed. A gust of 197 mph (317 km/h) was reported on 1 January 1992. An earlier gust in 1962 was recorded at 177 mph (285 km/h), both at RAF Saxa Vord. However, it is expected that higher gusts than those reported would have been achieved as during both storms the measuring equipment was destroyed by the extreme weather.

A wind gust of 194 mph (312 km/h) was recorded at Cairn Gorm on 19 December 2008 but was discovered too late to be verified by the Met Office.

The highest wind speed in England was a wind gust of 125.4 mph (201.8 km/h) recorded at The Needles, Isle of Wight, on 18 February 2022 during Storm Eunice.

=== Snowfall records ===
==== Most snowfall in a day ====
	Amount	Location	Date
Greatest depth in an inhabited area	83 in (210 cm)	Forest-in-Teesdale, County Durham	14 March 1947

=== Other notable records ===
==== Atmospheric pressure ====
Record	Level	Location	Date
Highest	1,053.6 mbar (31.11 inHg)	Aberdeen, Aberdeenshire	31 January 1902
Lowest	925.6 mbar (27.33 inHg)	Ochtertyre, Perthshire	26 January 1884
