= 1911 heat wave =

1911 heat wave may refer to:

- 1911 United Kingdom heat wave
- 1911 Eastern North America heat wave
