= 1906 British Isles heatwave =

Weather event in the UK and Ireland

Meteorological history
- Duration: Late August 1906 - September 1906
- Heat event
- Max temp: 35.6 °C (96.1 °F), recorded at Bawtry, South Yorkshire

Overall effects
- Areas affected: United Kingdom of Great Britain and Ireland

The 1906 British Isles heatwave occurred across the British Isles in August and September 1906. The heat wave had a comparable intensity to the 1990 heat wave. From 31 August to 3 September, the temperature in the UK exceeded 32 °C (90 °F) consecutively over much of the UK. In September, Central England and Birmingham recorded a maximum temperature of 31.5 °C (88.7 °F), while Oxford recorded a maximum temperature of 33.1 °C (91.6 °F).

2 September was the hottest day of the month, as temperatures reached 35.6 °C (96.1 °F) in Bawtry; this remains the hottest September temperature of any day in the UK and the eighth-hottest day overall in the 20th century.

Scotland had temperatures reaching 32.2 °C (90.0 °F) at Gordon Castle, Moray, while Northern Ireland had temperatures reaching 27.8 °C (82.0 °F) in Armagh, County Armagh, both recorded on 1 September 1906.

== September records ==
| Location | September 1906 maximum temperature | Date | Next record | Date of next record |
|---|---|---|---|---|
| Armagh, County Armagh | 27.8 °C (82.0 °F) | | | |
| Bawtry, South Yorkshire | 35.6 °C (96.1 °F) | 2 Sept. | | |
| Birmingham, West Midlands | 31.5 °C (88.7 °F) | | | |
| Collyweston, Northamptonshire | 35.0 °C (95.0 °F) | 1 Sept. | | |
| Gordon Castle, Moray | 32.2 °C (90.0 °F) | | | |
| New Malden, Greater London | 35.0 °C (95.0 °F) | 1 Sept. | | |
| Old Southgate, Greater London | 34.8 °C (94.6 °F) | 2 Sept. | | |
| Oxford, Oxfordshire | 33.1 °C (91.6 °F) | | 33.4 °C (92.1 °F) | September 1911 |
| Westley, Suffolk | 34.2 °C (93.6 °F) | 3 Sept. | | |
| Wryde, Cambridgeshire | 34.7 °C (94.5 °F) | 18 Aug. | | |

== See also ==
- Drought in the United Kingdom
