= 2018 North American heat wave =

Weather event in North America

Meteorological history
- Duration: June 28, 2018 - October 4, 2018
- Heat wave
- Max temp: 124.3 °F (51.3 °C)

Overall effects
- Fatalities: Over 70
- Areas affected: North America

The 2018 North American heat wave affected regions of Canada, where at least 70 deaths in Quebec were heat-related, the United States, where 18 states between Michigan and New Mexico issued heat advisories to a population of over 60 million people, and of Mexico, particularly the northwest and central regions.

== Canada ==
=== Quebec and Ontario ===
From June 29 to July 6, 2018, the air temperature consistently rose above 35 °C (95.0 °F) in parts of Quebec and Ontario. The humidex value for Ottawa on Canada Day between noon and 3 pm was 47.0 °C (116.6 °F), the highest ever recorded in the city. The humidex also peaked at 46.0 °C (114.8 °F) in Toronto and 45 °C (113 °F) in Montreal. The heat wave also affected the Maritimes, with the humidex value reaching 35 °C (95 °F) in Halifax and 45 °C (113 °F) at Greenwood in the Annapolis Valley, on 5 July.

On 4 July, Montreal emergency services reported twelve hundred calls per day about the heat, up 30% from prior busiest days.

As of 10 July, seventy-four people, most of them already ill, had died heat-related deaths in Quebec. This province's death toll is reported as much higher than others' because of its looser rules for attributing death to heat. In Ontario, where only accidental deaths directly caused by heat are counted, the coroner's office is investigating three possible cases.

=== Maritime provinces ===
While the heat wave ended on 10 July in Central Canada, this was not so for the Maritimes. On the 23rd of July, the interaction between a far-northwest Azores-Bermuda High and a trough over Ontario led to the issuing of heat warnings for all three Maritime Provinces, with several locations reporting humidex values in excess of 36. In Halifax, the heat wave contributed to a record-breaking number of hot days in July, with the airport reporting daily high temperatures in excess of 25 °C on twenty-two days that month, breaking the previous record of twenty-one days set in 2008, 2003, and 1924.

=== Western Canada ===
==== British Columbia ====
On 8 and 9 August, temperatures reached high levels in Metro Vancouver. The daily highs in Abbotsford were 35.6 °C (96.1 °F) and 34.1 °C (93.4 °F) respectively. Temperatures on the waterfront of Vancouver reached 31.0 °C (87.8 °F) and 30.8 °C (87.4 °F). The hottest temperature reached in the Lower Mainland was 36.5 °C (97.7 °F) in Cultus Lake. Cranbrook broke its record for August of 37.2 °C (99.0 °F), and the all-time record of 38.9 °C (102.0 °F), with temperatures reaching 40.5 °C (104.9 °F). Creston broke its August record of 38.0 °C (100.4 °F), reaching 38.7 °C (101.7 °F), but did not break the all-time record.

==== Alberta ====
The largest city to break an all-time record was Calgary, with temperatures reaching 36.7 °C (98.1 °F). The previous record for August was 35.6 °C (96.1 °F), while the all-time record was 36.1 °C (97.0 °F). Temperatures in Lethbridge reached 40.5 °C (104.9 °F), breaking the previous August record of 38.9 °C (102.0 °F), and surpassing its all-time record of 40.0 °C (104.0 °F). Medicine Hat reached 40.4 °C (104.7 °F), the highest recorded temperature since 1969. Barnwell recorded the highest temperature of 40.8 °C (105.4 °F) during the heat wave on August 10.

==== Saskatchewan ====
The core heat passed over Saskatchewan on August 10 and 11. Numerous temperature readings above 40 °C (104 °F) were recorded across the province including in Assiniboia and Swift Current, which both recorded 2 consecutive days with high temperatures above 40 °C (104 °F). This was the first time maximum temperatures greater than 40 °C (104 °F) were recorded since 2003. Numerous monthly records were set including in Moose Jaw, where the temperature reached 42.3 °C (108.1 °F), and Regina where the maximum temperature was 41.3 °C (106.3 °F).

==== Manitoba ====
Numerous daily records were set across Manitoba on August 11 and 12. High temperatures of 40.0 °C (104.0 °F) were recorded on Manitoba Agriculture weather stations in both Elm Creek and Waskada on August 12. These were the first 40 °C (104 °F) readings in Manitoba since 1989. Melita recorded three consecutive days with temperatures above 35.0 °C (95.0 °F) from August 10–12, peaking at 39.6 °C (103.3 °F) on August 12. On August 12 in Winnipeg, temperatures peaked at 37.5 °C (99.5 °F), the warmest temperature since 1995, with the humidex reaching 45.0 °C (113.0 °F), the third highest August humidex on record.

== United States ==
=== California ===
On 6 July, the temperature at UCLA was 111 °F (43.9 °C), breaking the all-time high temperature record of 109 °F (42.8 °C) set in 1939 but still 6 °F (3.3 °C) lower than the record 117 °F (47.2 °C) set in Woodland Hills, a Los Angeles neighborhood, at about 1 p.m. local time the same day, according to the weather service. Elsewhere in California, Santa Ana and Ramona hit respective record highs of 114 °F (45.6 °C) and 117 °F (47.2 °C). The combined conditions of heat and dryness fueled wildfires that caused one fatality and hundreds of evacuations. In Palm Springs the temperature reached 119 °F (48.3 °C).

On 7 July, approximately 34,000 customers of the Los Angeles Department of Water and Power (about 2.5% of its base) experienced power outages, some for up to 24 hours. The previous day, peak energy-demand set a new record for any July day in the city, at 6,256 megawatts.

On July 23 Palm Springs' temperature reached 119 °F (48.3 °C) again. On July 24 the temperature hit 121 °F (49.4 °C), two degrees Fahrenheit less than its all-time record set in July 1995.

California's state authorities and the California Independent System Operator both urged power conservation by people and business from 5 p.m. to 9 p.m. on July 24 and July 25, 2018. Flex Alerts were issued as the power grid began to overload. The Los Angeles County Department of Public Health also urged people to stay out of the sun on July 24. Thousands lost electricity in California due to sporadic temporary power cuts on July 24 as record temperatures hit the southwestern United States, including much of Arizona and parts of California and Utah.

On July 26, the visitor center at Furnace Creek, California in Death Valley had been over 111 °F (43.9 °C) since 10:00am and it climbed to 124.3 °F (51.3 °C) at 4pm local time. July 2018 was the warmest July ever in California. Death Valley set a global record for average temperature in a month ever at 108.1 °F (42.3 °C).

==== Wildfires ====
The forest fires that started near the Sequoia and Yosemite National Parks on July 13 grew July 22, 2018. The fires were visible for several miles on the south side of the Mineral King Road and Slapjack Creek, a National Park officials said on July 22. The Atwell-Hockett Trail and the Tar Gap Trail are closed due to the fire, But the Sequoia and Kings Canyon National Parks remain open on July 22. A bulldozer on July 13 and 4 firefighters had died by July 22. More than 2,800 firefighters, a fleet of aircraft and bulldozers had contained only 7% of its perimeter by July 22. An air tanker dropped fire retardant drop on the Horse Creek Fire in Sequoia National Park.

Several fires hit Whiskeytown, California; whilst others expanded past the Sacramento River and into Redding, California on July 28. At least 500 homes, businesses and other structures have been destroyed and 5 died by 28 July.

About 12,000 firefighters battled to contain wildfires in "erratic" winds across northern California on July 29. 6 Californians and 5 others elsewhere had died by June 29.

=== Arizona ===
Phoenix, Arizona recorded 116 °F (47 °C) on July 24 and 25, 2018 which was lower than the all-time high of 122 °F (50 °C) set on June 26, 1990

Yuma, Arizona recorded 118 °F (48 °C) on July 24, and 117 °F (47 °C) on July 25. This passed the previous record high of 110.8 °F (43.8 °C) in 1957.

=== Colorado ===
The temperature in Denver, Colorado, on 28 June, tied the city's record at 105 °F (40.6 °C). The record was set in 1878, then matched in 2005 and 2012.

=== Louisiana ===
The temperature in Shreveport, Louisiana on July 21 was 106 °F (41.1 °C).

=== Nevada ===
The temperature in Las Vegas, Nevada on July 25, 26 and 27 was 113 °F (45.0 °C); on July 28 it reached 112 °F (44.4 °C).

=== Oklahoma ===
The temperature in Lawton, Oklahoma on July 19 was 111 °F (43.9 °C).

=== Texas ===
The temperature in Dallas, Texas on July 22 was 112 °F (44.4 °C). The temperature in Wichita Falls on July 19 and July 22 reached 112 °F (44.4 °C).

=== Utah ===
The temperature in St. George, Utah on July 24 and 25 was 109 °F (42.8 °C); on July 26 it reached 110 °F (43.3 °C).

== Mexico ==
By the end of May 2018, Mexico was already one week into the heat wave. The states of Baja California, Sonora, Nayarit, Jalisco, Oaxaca, Coahuila, Durango, Zacatecas, San Luis Potosi, Querétaro and Morelos registered temperatures between 40 °C (104.0 °F) to 45 °C (113.0 °F), while Sinaloa, Chihuahua, Michoacán and Hidalgo between 45 °C (113.0 °F) and 50 °C (122.0 °F). The states of Hidalgo, Chihuahua, Sinaloa, Zacatecas and Jalisco broke historical highs going back more than 50 years. Chihuahua broke its 1978 record temperature and Sinaloa surpassed the high recorded there in 1961. The federal Ministry of the Interior announced that a state of emergency was declared in 573 municipalities in 22 states, and it stated that food and water was being delivered to prevent people from suffering dehydration.

By early June 2018, the Mexican government had declared a state of emergency in more than three hundred municipalities. The extraordinary sales of cold beverages, ice creams, pops and other items popular during hot weather increased to such an extent that Canacope Puebla, a Mexico City business chamber, estimated the nation's GDP would increase by approximately 260 million pesos ($13 mln).

Peak temperatures in July 2018 included: Hermosillo, Sonora, where on July 23 the temperature reached 47.2 °C (117 °F), and Mexicali, Baja California, where on July 23, 24 and 25 the temperature reached 46.1 °C (115 °F).

== See also ==
- 2018 heat wave
- Heat Dome
