= 2023 China heat wave =

Heat wave affecting China

Meteorological history
- Date: June 2023
- Heat event
- Max temp: 106 °F (41 °C), recorded at Beijing on June 23

Overall effects
- Areas affected: China

In June 2023, China experienced a heat wave that has broken records and affected Beijing and other parts of northern China. The high temperatures prompted authorities to issue warnings and urge people to limit their time outdoors. On June 23, 2023, the temperature in Beijing reached 106 °F (41 °C), which was the highest June temperature recorded since 1961.

== Response ==
In response to the heat wave, Beijing issued an orange alert, which is the second-most severe weather warning. The alert warned that temperatures could reach as high as 39°C from 22 to 24 June. In Hebei province and Tianjin, red alerts were sent out, the most severe level of warning.

== Impact ==
The heat wave had a significant impact on the people and infrastructure of the affected areas. The increased demand for air conditioning put a strain on power grids, and in some places, power outages occurred. Authorities took steps to protect crops and ensure the safety of tourists, and outdoor work was halted during the hottest part of the day.
