= List of named heat waves =

Named heat waves are warm weather events that have been designated with a nickname due to their historical significance. Extreme heat is recognized as a natural phenomenon that poses severe risks to human health, and the likelihood of such incidents has increased due to the effects of climate change. The decision to start naming such events was first officially adopted in June of 2022 by the city of Seville, Spain with Heatwave Zoe. While Seville elected to designate five names for 2022 in reverse alphabetical order, unlike the relatively standardized conventions for naming Tropical cyclone naming, there is currently no regional consensus for the naming of heat waves. Several countries have their own schemes.

== Named heat waves ==
=== 2017 ===
- Heatwave Lucifer

=== 2022 ===
- Heatwave Zoe
- Heatwave Yago

=== 2023 ===
- Heatwave Cerberus
- Heatwave Charon

2025

- Heatwave Adam
