= List of extreme temperatures in Japan =

Since the establishment of the first weather station in Hakodate in 1872, Japan has recorded temperature changes across the country. According to the data provided by Japan Meteorological Agency, the maximum recorded temperature in Japan was 41.8°C in Isesaki, Gunma on August 5, 2025, while the minimum recorded temperature was −41.0 °C (−41.8 °F) in Asahikawa, Hokkaido on January 25, 1902. Below is a list of the most extreme temperatures recorded in Japan.

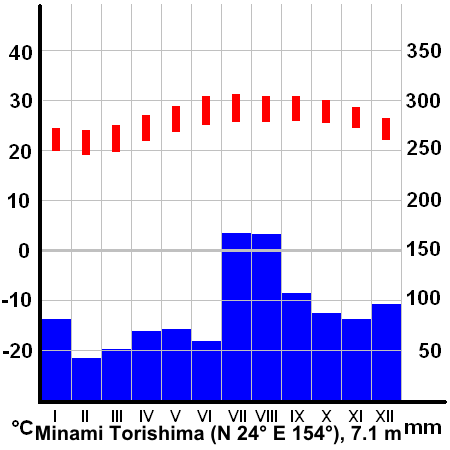
Minami-Tori-shima is the region with the highest annual average temperature in Japan.

In the whole of Japan, the place with the lowest annual average temperature is not Hokkaido, but Mount Fuji at the junction of Shizuoka and Yamanashi prefecture. The annual average temperature is −5.9 °C (21.4 °F), which is the average annual temperature of all weather stations in Japan so far. The only area with a negative value, Mount Fuji's extreme maximum temperature was only 17.8 °C (64.0 °F), which was measured on August 13, 1942.

In contrast, Minami-Tori-shima has the highest annual average temperature in Japan. This is a small island in the Pacific Ocean, some 1850 km from Honshu. It has an annual average temperature of 25.8 °C (78.4 °F), exceeding the value recorded by all weather stations including Okinawa Prefecture. And the extreme minimum temperature in the region is 13.8 °C (56.8 °F), which is unique in the whole of Japan, because even in Okinawa Prefecture, the minimum temperature of the year tends to be lower than 10 °C (50 °F).

Climate data for Japan, extremes 1872−present
Month	Jan	Feb	Mar	Apr	May	Jun	Jul	Aug	Sep	Oct	Nov	Dec	Year
Record high °C (°F)	29.7 (85.5)	29.1 (84.4)	30.4 (86.7)	33.7 (92.7)	39.5 (103.1)	40.2 (104.4)	41.2 (106.2)	41.8 (107.2)	40.4 (104.7)	36.0 (96.8)	34.2 (93.6)	31.6 (88.9)	41.8 (107.2)
Record low °C (°F)	−41.0 (−41.8)	−38.3 (−36.9)	−35.2 (−31.4)	−27.8 (−18.0)	−18.9 (−2.0)	−13.1 (8.4)	−6.9 (19.6)	−4.3 (24.3)	−10.8 (12.6)	−19.5 (−3.1)	−28.1 (−18.6)	−34.2 (−29.6)	−41.0 (−41.8)
Source: Japan Meteorological Agency

== Maximum temperatures ==
Japan maximum temperature extremes, by month
Month	Highest maximum temperatures			Lowest maximum temperatures		
Month	°C	°F	Location and date	°C	°F	Location and date
January	29.7	85.5	Minami-Tori-shima (9 Jan 2021)	−32.0	−25.6	Mount Fuji (31 Jan 1936)
February	29.1	84.4	Ishigaki, Okinawa (16 Feb 1898)	−30.2	−22.4	Mount Fuji (17 Feb 1977)
March	30.4	86.7	Naze, Amami, Kagoshima (26 March 1999)	−30.1	−22.2	Mount Fuji (5 Mar 1977)
April	33.7	92.7	Yonago, Tottori (28 Apr 2005)	−21.2	−6.2	Mount Fuji (12 Apr 1996)
May	39.5	103.1	Saroma, Hokkaido (26 May 2019)	−13.4	7.9	Mount Fuji (6 May 1945)
June	40.2	104.4	Isesaki, Gunma (25 Jun 2022)	−6.6	20.1	Mount Fuji (2 Jun 1981)
July	41.2	106.2	Tamba, Hyōgo (30 Jul 2025)	−1.2	29.8	Mount Fuji (8 Jul 1945)
August	41.8	107.2	Isesaki, Gunma (5 Aug 2025)	0.6	33.1	Mount Fuji (25 Aug 1972)
September	40.4	104.7	Sanjō, Niigata (3 Sep 2020)	−6.2	20.8	Mount Fuji (24 Sep 1976)
October	36.0	96.8	Sanjō, Niigata (6 Oct 2018)	−13.7	7.3	Mount Fuji (24 Oct 1947)
November	34.2	93.6	Minami-Tori-shima (4 Nov 1953)	−24.8	−12.6	Mount Fuji (30 Nov 1970)
December	31.6	88.9	Minami-Tori-shima (5 Dec 1952)	−28.7	−19.7	Mount Fuji (26 Dec 1995)

== Minimum temperatures ==
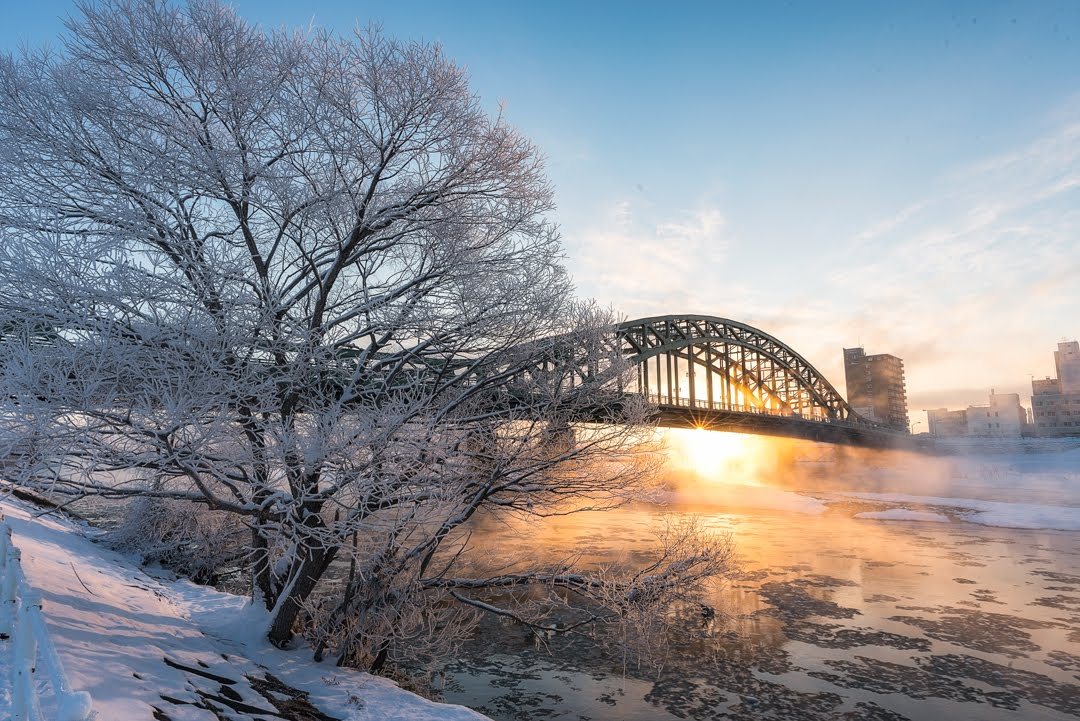
Asahikawa is one of the coldest cities in Japan, pictured here is the Asahibashi Bridge in Asahikawa in winter.

Japan minimum temperature extremes, by month
Month	Highest minimum temperatures			Lowest minimum temperatures		
Month	°C	°F	Location and date	°C	°F	Location and date
January	26.0	78.8	Minami-Tori-shima (9 Jan 2021)	−41.0	−41.8	Asahikawa, Hokkaido (25 Jan 1902)
February	24.5	76.1	Iriomote Island (11 Feb 2010); Ishigaki, Okinawa (11 Feb 2010)	−38.3	−36.9	Asahikawa, Hokkaido (11 Feb 1902)
March	25.2	77.4	Minami-Tori-shima (22 Mar 1999)	−35.2	−31.4	Obihiro, Hokkaido (3 Mar 1895)
April	26.9	80.4	Ishigaki, Okinawa (30 Apr 2019)	−27.8	−18.0	Mount Fuji (3 Apr 1965)
May	28.7	83.7	Tarama, Okinawa (29 May 2016)	−18.9	−2.0	Mount Fuji (3 May 1934)
June	29.7	85.5	Ishigaki, Okinawa (30 Jun 2015)	−13.1	8.4	Mount Fuji (2 Jun 1981)
July	30.3	86.5	Komatsu, Ishikawa (31 Jul 2000)	−6.9	19.6	Mount Fuji (4 Jul 1966)
August	31.3	88.3	Itoigawa, Niigata (15 Aug 2019)	−4.3	24.3	Mount Fuji (25 Aug 1972)
September	29.8	85.6	Koshino, Fukui (3 Sep 2020)	−10.8	12.6	Mount Fuji (23 Sep 1976)
October	28.6	83.5	Minami-Tori-shima (7 Oct 2019)	−19.5	−3.1	Mount Fuji (30 Oct 1984)
November	27.6	81.7	Minami-Tori-shima (6 Nov 2020)	−28.1	−18.6	Mount Fuji (30 Nov 1970)
December	26.3	79.3	Minami-Tori-shima (4 Dec 1998)	−34.2	−29.6	Obihiro, Hokkaido (30 Dec 1907)
