= 2022 China heat wave =

Heat wave affecting China

Meteorological history
- Duration: 13 June - 31 August 2022
- Heat event
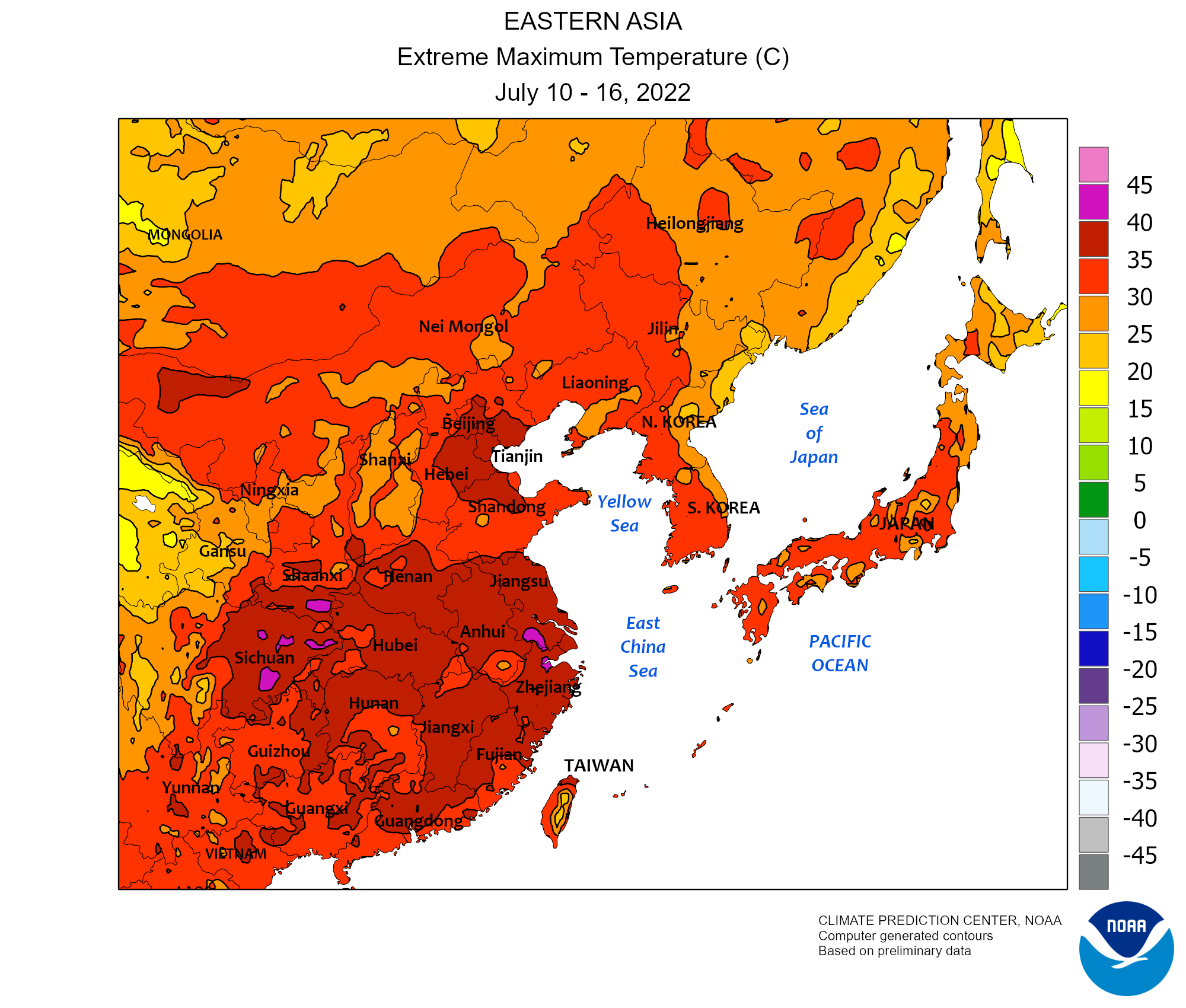
- A map of extreme temperatures in East Asia from 10 to 16 July 2022.
- Max temp: 45.0 °C (113.0 °F), recorded at Beibei on 18 August 2022

Overall effects
- Fatalities: 50,900 (estimated) reference/source?
- Damage: $7.6 billion (2022 USD)
- Areas affected: China

From June to 31 August 2022, China had a severe heat wave which affected several provinces and municipalities. To date, it is the country's worst heat wave to have existed. According to weather historian Maximiliano Herrera, it is the most severe heat wave recorded anywhere in the world.

== History ==
According to the China Meteorological Administration (CMA), the national average temperature was listed as 21.3 °C in June. It was 0.9 degrees higher than in the same period last year, making that month the hottest since 1961. In northern Henan, the hottest days on 24 June were in Xuchang with 42.1 °C and Dengfeng with 41.6 °C recorded since records began.

=== August ===
By August, the highest temperatures were recorded across China, while at the same time, less water flowed in the Yangtze, the lowest since 1961. Jiangsu, Hubei and Sichuan provinces had been hit by widespread droughts, local authorities have been ordered to cut water supplies for agricultural, commercial and industrial uses. The drought has already affected more than 800,000 hectares of farmland in six provinces. In August, the weather reached 43.5 °C in Gao County, 43.4 °C in Jianyang and Zigong, 41 °C in Mianyang, 34.9 °C in Chongqing at night, and 45 °C in Beibei.

On 18 August, it was reported that silver iodide was used to form clouds in Anhui and other provinces. From 24 to 26 August, high temperatures in southern Shaanxi, Jianghan, Jianghuai and Jiangnan cooled down from north to south. On 25 August, artificial rainfall was implemented in parts of Sichuan and Chongqing. On 26 August, the high temperature range in the Sichuan Basin and Jiangnan began to decrease. On 28 August, general industrial and commercial electricity consumption in Sichuan was fully restored and the province's electricity shortage situation eased. On 29 August, high temperatures in the Sichuan Basin decreased. Temperatures in most parts of Chongqing dropped below 30°C. On 30 August, the drought in parts of the Yangtze River Basin eased. On 31 August, high temperatures subsided in most of southern China.

== Impact ==
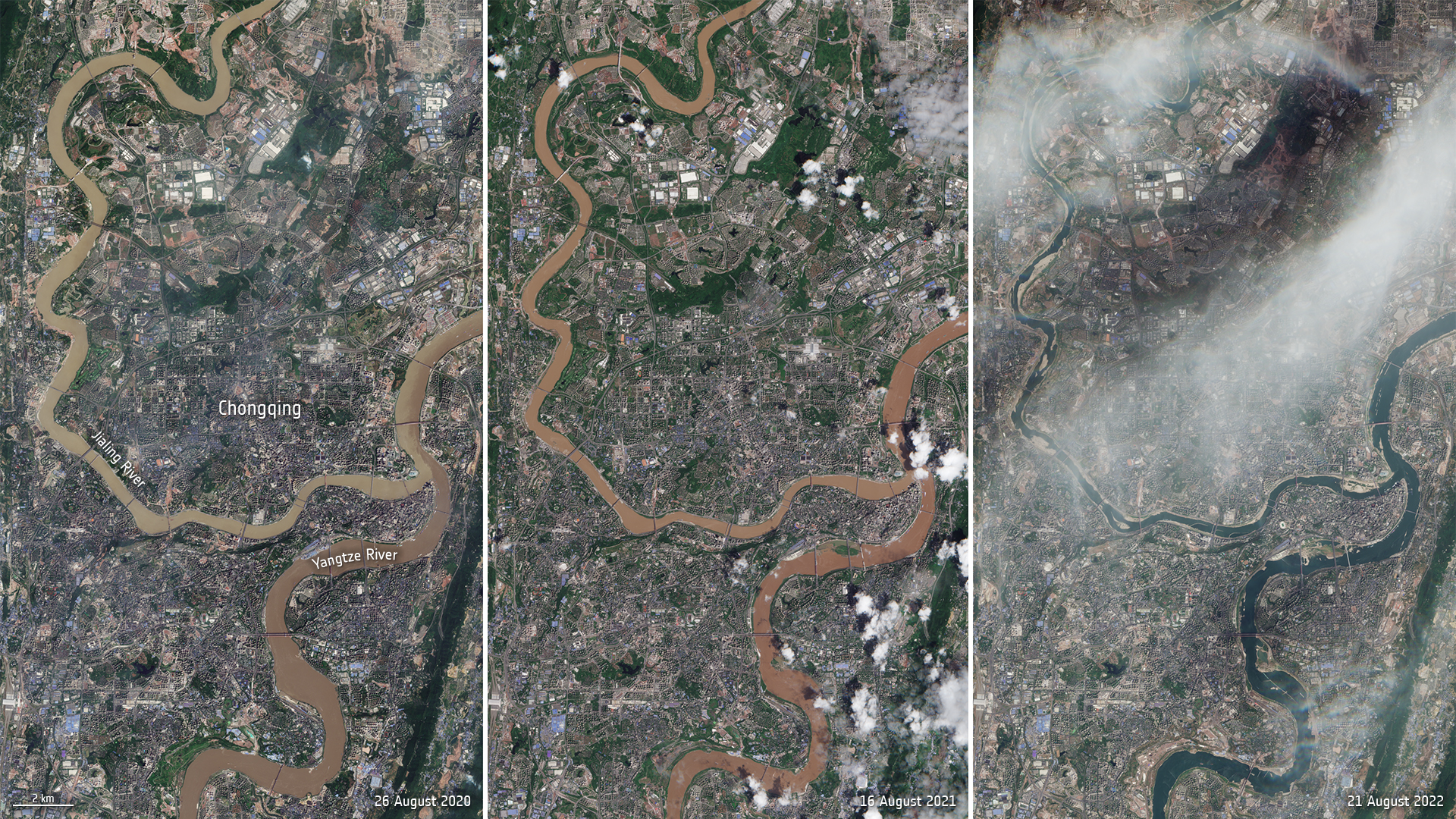
Drought causes Yangtze to shrink in Chongqing

Due to the drought and increasing power consumption due to the heat, there was a resulting energy crisis of which several factories had to be shut down. The heat wave had also affected the country's economy.

A 2023 report from The Lancet suggested a death toll of 50,900 due to the heatwave.

The drought and persistent heat had also caused more forest fires in China, particularly in Chongqing. Also because of the heat and lack of rain, the level of the Yangtze sharply decreased, and the Three Gorges Dam was opened in order to refill water into that river.

Poyang Lake, which is located in Jiujiang, Jiangxi, has been reduced to just 25% of its usual size due to extreme weather conditions, causing a major drought.

== See also ==
- List of heat waves
- 2022 heat waves
