= 1808 United Kingdom heatwave =

Weather event in the United Kingdom

Meteorological history
- Date: July 1808
- Heat event
- Max temp: 38 °C (100 °F), recorded at London, England on 13 July 1808

Overall effects
- Areas affected: United Kingdom

The 1808 United Kingdom heat wave was a period of exceptionally high temperatures during July 1808. In the Central England Temperature series, dating back to 1659, at the time it was the 2nd hottest July on record, the hottest since 1783. As of 2022, it is the 9th hottest July on record. The month included some of the highest temperatures ever recorded in the UK. Temperature records from this time are likely dubious as the Stevenson screen was not introduced until the 1860s.

== Weather ==
July 1808 was the second hottest July on record, at the time with an extreme notable heatwave from the 12th to 15 July, peaking on the 13th and 14th. Temperatures above 36 °C (97 °F) were recorded in many areas on the 13th and 14th, with London reaching 38 °C (100 °F) on the 13th, with a possible reading of 41 °C (105 °F).

- Reports from Weather Stations around the United Kingdom:

Town or City	Temperature	Date
Northampton	33 °C (91 °F)	13 July
Kingston upon Hull	34 °C (93 °F)	13 July
Suffolk	37 °C (99 °F)	13 July
London	36 °C (97 °F)	12 July

When the heatwave was coming to a close on the 15th, there were some very severe thunderstorms. These most severe of the storms affected Dorset, Somerset and Gloucestershire. However, a 59 miles (95 km) swath was also damaged between Bath and Bristol. Reports of hail stones up to 1 foot (300 mm) long were recorded in Somerset, with hailstones of a more general 70 to 100 millimetres (2.8 to 3.9 in) being reported as well. Ball Lightning was also observed in Gloucester, and was noted as destroying one of the pinnacles at the west end of Gloucester Cathedral. It is thought that this is one of the most severe hailstorms in the history of the United Kingdom, along with that of 1697.

== Impacts ==
As a result of the hot temperatures and following thunderstorms, many people lost their lives, especially in the counties of Bedfordshire, Buckinghamshire and Northamptonshire. Animals were also badly affected as a result of the hot weather, with 50 post horses dying as a result on the Great North Road alone. Farmers also struggled. Despite being able to harvest their crops early, other products melted quickly such as butter and honeycomb.
