= 1911 United Kingdom heatwave =

Period of unusually hot weather in the summer of 1911

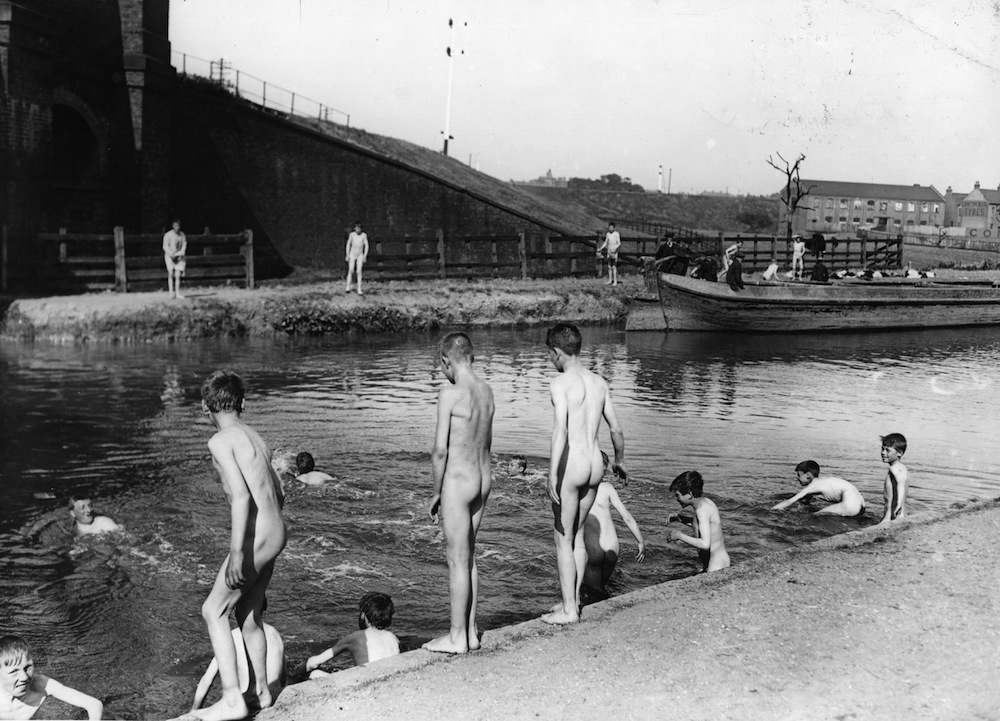
- Boys swimming nude in Regents Canal during the heatwave in 1911.

Meteorological history
- Duration: Early July - Mid-September 1911
- Heat event
- Max temp: 36.7 °C (98.1 °F), recorded at Raunds, Northamptonshire and Canterbury, Kent on 9 August 1911 (Note: 37.8 °C (100.0 °F) was reported at Greenwich, London, but this has since been disregarded as non-standard.)

Overall effects
- Areas affected: United Kingdom and Ireland

The United Kingdom heatwave of 1911 was a particularly severe heatwave and associated drought. Records were set around the country for temperature in England, including the highest accepted temperature, at the time, of 36.7 °C (98.1 °F), only broken 79 years later in the 1990 heatwave, which reached 37.1 °C (98.8 °F). A temperature of 37.8 °C (100.0 °F) was recorded at Greenwich in a Glaisher stand and was regarded as the record, but further data from a Stevenson screen in the same location showed the temperature to be 35.9 °C (96.6 °F).

== Description ==
The heatwave began around early July and ended two and a half months later, in mid September.

By 17 July temperatures were 27 °C (81 °F) and by 20 July there had been no rain for 20 days, meaning a drought had officially begun. In the height of the heatwave, at the end of July, temperatures were 33 °C (91 °F) in Kings Lynn, breaking all previous records in that area. The heatwave and drought continued into August, with temperatures up to 27 °C (81 °F) on 1 August continuing throughout the month in London. Even into September, the heatwave was still continuing, with temperatures up to 33 °C (91 °F) in early September.

The heatwave and drought only ended on 11 September when average temperatures dropped by 20 °C (36 °F) and the high pressure dominating the country receded, allowing rain over all parts of the country.

== Heatwave impacts ==
The impacts of the heatwave extended over all parts and sectors of the country. The impacts began to be felt around mid July, around three weeks after the heatwave began. Because of the extreme heat, working patterns changed in Lancashire, with work beginning at dawn, around 4:30 am and finishing around midday, to avoid the hottest part of the day in the quarrying industry there. Fatalities became common and newspapers such as The Times ran Deaths by heat columns as temperatures continued to rise. The heat also caused indirect deaths, by melting the asphalt on roads, causing numerous accidents.

By the beginning of August, even the health of country people was being adversely affected with stifling, humid nights, meaning food spoiled very quickly without refrigeration and sewage spilled out. Also in August, striking became common, most notably in the Victoria and Albert Docks, where the entire workforce of 5,000 people walked out, because of the intolerable heat, meaning the whole area came to a standstill.

== Drought impacts ==
The extensive drought affected all parts of the country. Again, the effects were felt around mid July, when early harvests were taken in and fires began to break out, along railway tracks in Ascot and gorse around Newbury. By the end of July, the heat and lack of rain had begun to affect agriculture. There was a shortage of grass for cattle as pastures turned brown from drought. This forced farmers to raise the price of milk, to compensate for the lack of production. On 28 July trees and some rare plants had begun to wither and die with the lack of water in the soil, even in shaded areas all around the country. By August, wells, water pumps and water supplies had begun to run completely dry. This led to the stopping of activity in farming and pasture in Essex and the closing of wool mills in Bradford, each an important industry in its area.

An unusual impact of the hot and dry 1911 summer was seen in the cricket County Championship of 1911, where Warwickshire's narrow win was the only time between 1890 and 1935 where the Championship was not won by one of the "Big Six" of Yorkshire, Surrey, Kent, Lancashire, Nottinghamshire and Middlesex. The unusually hot and dry weather created extremely fast pitches that suited Warwickshire's pace bowlers Foster and Field and camouflaged their deficiencies in batting and spin bowling on wet pitches.

== Sunshine ==
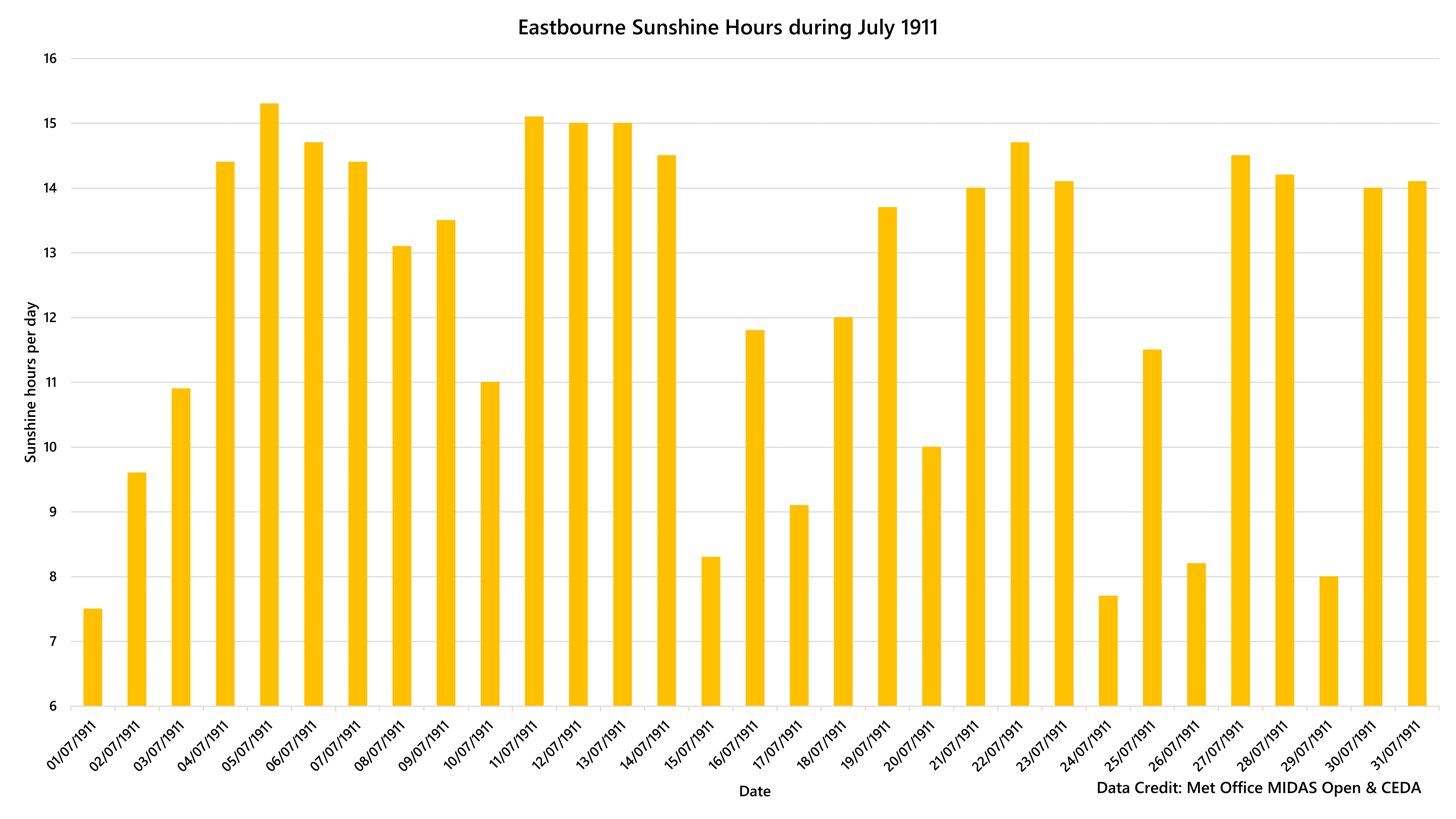
A graph using Met Office MIDAS Open data showing sunshine hours at Eastbourne in East Sussex during July 1911.

Sunshine in July 1911 broke all time records for the UK and across the south coast of England, with Eastbourne, Sussex and Hastings topping 383.9 hours, averaging 12.4 hours a day, with many other south coast spots such as Bognor Regis with 372.2 hours not far behind. Much of the south coast outshone many Mediterranean locations, and Eastbourne was very close to the levels of sunshine expected in Las Vegas and in the Nevada desert in the US for July. Since the average July sunshine in Eastbourne is about 255 hours, the town received about 50% more sunshine than usual.

== Bibliography ==
- Kendon, Mike; Prior, John (2011). "Two remarkable British summers – 'perfect' 1911 and 'calamitous' 1912". Weather. 66 (7): 179–184. Bibcode:2011Wthr...66..179K. doi:10.1002/wea.818. ISSN 1477-8696.
- Winder, Jon; Duteil, Chloé; Schlichting, Kara; Pearson, Chris (20 January 2026). "Sensing Heat, Finding Cool: The Search for Water in Summertime Paris, New York, and London, 1880-1930". Journal of Social History shaf109. doi:10.1093/jsh/shaf109. ISSN 0022-4529. PMC 7618688. PMID 41624293.
