= Heat advisory =

Weather statement indicating high heat index values

A heat advisory is a notice issued by the National Weather Service of the United States for temperatures or heat index values high enough to be potentially dangerous. The criteria can vary depending on location. High values of the heat index are caused by temperatures being significantly above normal, coupled with high humidities. Such combined high levels can pose a threat to human life through conditions such as heat stroke.

== Example ==
The following is an example of a heat advisory issued by the National Weather Service office in Pittsburgh, Pennsylvania.

URGENT - WEATHER MESSAGE
National Weather Service Pittsburgh PA
341 PM EDT Wed Jul 8 2020

OHZ039>041-048>050-057>059-068-069-PAZ020-021-029-031-073-075-
WVZ001>004-012-021-509-090345-
/O.NEW.KPBZ.HT.Y.0001.200709T1700Z-200710T0000Z/
Tuscarawas-Carroll-Columbiana-Coshocton-Harrison-Jefferson OH-
Muskingum-Guernsey-Belmont-Noble-Monroe-Beaver-Allegheny-
Washington-Greene-Westmoreland-Fayette-Hancock-Brooke-Ohio-
Marshall-Wetzel-Marion-Monongalia-
Including the cities of New Philadelphia, Dover, Carrollton,
Malvern, East Liverpool, Salem, Columbiana, Coshocton, Cadiz,
Steubenville, Zanesville, Cambridge, Martins Ferry,
St. Clairsville, Caldwell, Woodsfield, Aliquippa, Beaver Falls,
Ambridge, Monaca, Pittsburgh Metro Area, Washington, Canonsburg,
Waynesburg, Murrysville, Greensburg, New Kensington,
Lower Burrell, Latrobe, Monessen, Uniontown, Weirton, Follansbee,
Wellsburg, Wheeling, Moundsville, New Martinsville, Fairmont,
and Morgantown
341 PM EDT Wed Jul 8 2020

...HEAT ADVISORY IN EFFECT FROM 1 PM TO 8 PM EDT THURSDAY...

* WHAT...Heat index values up to 102 expected.

* WHERE...Portions of southwest and western Pennsylvania, east
  central Ohio and northern and the northern panhandle of West
  Virginia.

* WHEN...From 1 PM to 8 PM EDT Thursday.

* IMPACTS...Hot temperatures and high humidity may cause heat
  illnesses to occur.

PRECAUTIONARY/PREPAREDNESS ACTIONS...

Drink plenty of fluids, stay in an air-conditioned room, stay out
of the sun, and check up on relatives and neighbors. Young
children and pets should never be left unattended in vehicles
under any circumstances.

Take extra precautions if you work or spend time outside. When
possible reschedule strenuous activities to early morning or
evening. Know the signs and symptoms of heat exhaustion and heat
stroke. Wear lightweight and loose fitting clothing when
possible. To reduce risk during outdoor work, the Occupational
Safety and Health Administration recommends scheduling frequent
rest breaks in shaded or air conditioned environments. Anyone
overcome by heat should be moved to a cool and shaded location.
Heat stroke is an emergency! Call 9 1 1.

&&

$$

== See also ==
- Severe weather terminology (United States)
