= 1990 United Kingdom heatwave =

Period of hot weather in 1990

Meteorological history
- Duration: 1-4 August 1990
- Heat event
- Max temp: 37.1 °C (98.8 °F), recorded at Cheltenham, Gloucestershire

Overall effects
- Areas affected: United Kingdom and Ireland

During the 1990 heat wave in the United Kingdom a weather station recorded a temperature of 37.1 °C (98.8 °F) for Cheltenham, Gloucestershire.

== Impact ==
Moorland fires were common during the height of the heat wave, occurring in North Yorkshire and the Peak District. Some 100 square miles (260 km^{2}) of the Peak District was closed to the public to try to prevent further fires occurring from careless visitors. Roads were clogged as people flocked to the coast and to holiday resorts throughout the country. Transport was further hampered as train services around the country slowed due to concerns over anomalies in the railway network from the intense heat. Reservoir levels fell, although the Water Services Association assured the public that "most people are still getting their full supply of water without any restrictions at all".

== Statistics ==
Station	County / UA	August 1990 maximum temperature	Date	Previous record	Date of previous record	Next record	Date of next record
Bidston	Merseyside	34.5 °C (94.1 °F)	2	31.7 °C (89.1 °F)	22 July 1873		
Bolton	Greater Manchester	32.1 °C (89.8 °F)	3	31.7 °C (89.1 °F)	27 August 1930		
Boscombe Down	Wiltshire	34.2 °C (93.6 °F)	3	33.3 °C (91.9 °F)	2 July 1976	34.5 °C (94.1 °F)	19 July 2006
Bradford	West Yorkshire	32.2 °C (90.0 °F)	3	31.1 °C (88.0 °F)	12 August 1953		
Buxton	Derbyshire	32.7 °C (90.9 °F)	3	30.0 °C (86.0 °F)	31 July 1943		
Cambridge Botanic Gardens	Cambridgeshire	36.5 °C (97.7 °F)	3	35.6 °C (96.1 °F)	19 August 1932	38.7 °C (101.7 °F)	25 July 2019
Cardiff (Weather Centre)	Cardiff	34.5 °C (94.1 °F)	3	33.1 °C (91.6 °F)	13 July 1983		
Cheltenham	Gloucestershire	37.1 °C (98.8 °F)	3	35.9 °C (96.6 °F)	3 July 1976		
Durham Observatory	County Durham	32.5 °C (90.5 °F)	3	30.6 °C (87.1 °F)	31 July 1943		
Eastbourne	East Sussex	32.6 °C (90.7 °F)	4	31.6 °C (88.9 °F)	3 July 1976		
Hampstead	Greater London	34.6 °C (94.3 °F)	3	34.4 °C (93.9 °F)	19 August 1932	37.4 °C (99.3 °F)	10 August 2003
Harrogate	North Yorkshire	33.1 °C (91.6 °F)	2	30.6 °C (87.1 °F)	31 July 1943		
Hawarden Bridge	Flintshire	35.2 °C (95.4 °F)	2	33.0 °C (91.4 °F)	3 July 1976		
Hull	Hull	34.4 °C (93.9 °F)	3	32.8 °C (91.0 °F)	7 July 1941		
Leuchars	Fife	30.8 °C (87.4 °F)	2	28.9 °C (84.0 °F)	2 July 1933		
Macclesfield	Cheshire East	33.1 °C (91.6 °F)	3	32.2 °C (90.0 °F)	9 August 1911		
Newport	Telford and Wrekin	34.8 °C (94.6 °F)	3	32.0 °C (89.6 °F)	3 July 1976		
Nottingham (Watnall)	Nottinghamshire	34.6 °C (94.3 °F)	3	33.8 °C (92.8 °F)	8 August 1975		
Prestatyn	Denbighshire	34.3 °C (93.7 °F)	2	32.4 °C (90.3 °F)	3 July 1976		
Reading	Reading	35.5 °C (95.9 °F)	3	35.0 °C (95.0 °F)	12 July 1923	36.4 °C (97.5 °F)	10 August 2003
Rothamsted	Hertfordshire	33.8 °C (92.8 °F)	3	33.3 °C (91.9 °F)	19 August 1932	35.6 °C (96.1 °F)	10 August 2003
Sandown	Isle of Wight	32.0 °C (89.6 °F)	4	31.1 °C (88.0 °F)	16 August 1947		
Sheffield	South Yorkshire	34.3 °C (93.7 °F)	3	33.5 °C (92.3 °F)	9 August 1911		
Skegness	Lincolnshire	32.4 °C (90.3 °F)	3	32.0 °C (89.6 °F)	29 July 1983		
South Farnborough	Hampshire	36.2 °C (97.2 °F)	3	35.9 °C (96.6 °F)	3 July 1976		
Southport (Greenbank)	Merseyside	33.9 °C (93.0 °F)	2	32.0 °C (89.6 °F)	3 July 1976		
Sutton Bonington	Nottinghamshire	34.8 °C (94.6 °F)	3	32.8 °C (91.0 °F)	12 August 1953		
Tynemouth	Tyne and Wear	31.9 °C (89.4 °F)	3	28.1 °C (82.6 °F)	16 July 1969		

== See also ==
- Heat waves
- Drought
- Drought in the United Kingdom
