= 2018 heatwaves =

Heat wave in parts of the Northern Hemisphere

In 2018, several heat waves with temperatures far above the long-time average and droughts were recorded in the Northern Hemisphere: The earth's average surface temperature in 2018 was the fourth highest in the 140 years of record keeping. It is assumed that the jet stream is slowing down, trapping cloudless, windless and extremely hot regions of high pressure. The jet stream anomalies could be caused by polar amplification, one of the observed effects of global warming.

According to the World Meteorological Organization, the severe heat waves across the Northern Hemisphere in the summer of 2018, are linked to climate change, as well as events of extreme precipitation. The results were an increase in mortality of the elderly, severe declines in crop yields, as well as the biggest algae bloom in the Baltic Sea in decades. This poisoned water both for human and animal use. Additionally, nuclear power plants in Europe were having issues, because the water in the rivers used for cooling the reactors was too warm. This had the effect of electricity grids crashing in areas on four continents. The impacts were severe, even in some countries that are considered well prepared to deal with the impacts of climate change.

== By region ==
- 2018 European heat wave
  - 2018 British Isles heat wave
    - 2018 United Kingdom wildfires
  - 2018 Sweden wildfires
  - 2018 Attica wildfires
- 2018 North American heat wave
- 2018 Northeast Asia heat wave

== See also ==
- Climate change in the Arctic
- Hothouse earth
