= 2018 United Kingdom wildfires =

Natural disasters

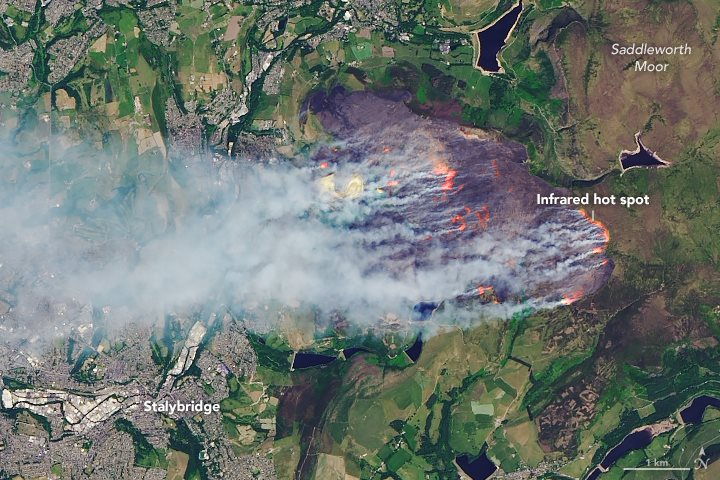
- Annotated view of the Saddleworth Moor fire on 27 June, taken by NASA's Landsat 8 satellite
- Date: 24 June 2018 – 3 September 2018

Statistics
- Total fires: 66 (30 ha (74 acres) or larger)
- Total area: 17,689 ha (43,710 acres; 176.89 km^{2}; 68.30 sq mi)

Starting on 24 June 2018 and continuing throughout the summer, a record-breaking series of wildfires burned across the United Kingdom. The two largest fires, which were declared major incidents, burned over 7 square miles (4,480 acres; 18 km^{2}) each and broke out on Saddleworth Moor in Greater Manchester and Winter Hill in Lancashire. Other large fires broke out in Glenshane Pass in County Londonderry, Northern Ireland (640 acres), Epping Forest, in London and in the Vale of Rheidol in Ceredigion, Wales. The Saddleworth Moor fire has been described as the largest English wildfire in living memory. Most of the wildfires occurred during the first official heatwave in the United Kingdom since June 2017, with temperatures reaching above 30 °C (86 °F) for several days, making the hottest June in the country since 1995, and the driest June for over ten years in large parts of the United Kingdom, exacerbating the crisis. A wildfire started on the Staffordshire Moorlands on 9 August and, despite rain, had spread to cover 219 acres by 11 August. Some hot spots were still burning as at 22 August. In total, there were 79 fires over the course of the year, a new record. However, the record was beaten in 2019 with 96 fires as of April 23.

== Background ==
June 2018 was the driest on record for some parts of the UK, as a result of a persistent strong Azores High that blocked Atlantic low-pressure weather systems from reaching the British Isles and bringing rainfall. For much of the time, a strong anticlockwise wind circulation around Britain and Ireland caused a strong warm anticyclone there. As a result, in the lead-up to the outbreak of wildfires across the country, many areas were unusually dry. Drought conditions were reported in parts of the country by the end of the month, with NI Water introducing a hosepipe ban in Northern Ireland from 6 pm on 29 June, the first hosepipe ban in the area since 1995.

Towards the end of the month, prolonged high pressure moving in from southern Europe brought with it a prolonged period of high temperatures, marking the first official heat wave in the United Kingdom since June 2017. Temperatures of over 30 °C (86 °F) were reported widely in all four nations of the United Kingdom for the first time since July 2013, with June 2018 becoming the warmest June month since 1995. On 26 June, a high of 30.6 °C (87.1 °F) was recorded at Porthmadog in Gwynedd, Wales, making it the hottest day of the year so far for the United Kingdom. Porthmadog continued to break temperature records on subsequent days, reaching 31.9 °C (89.4 °F) on 27 June and then 32.6 °C (90.7 °F) on 28 June. By 6 July, the heatwave, which had lasted just over two weeks, was the longest in the United Kingdom since July 2013.

The drought conditions were exacerbated by May 2018 being the warmest since 2008 and the driest since 2011. It was especially dry in parts of Northern England, where rainfall was the lowest.

== Fires ==
Member of Parliament Jonathan Reynolds, Shadow Economic Secretary to the Treasury, said ministers would “need to look seriously at our capacity to deal with these kinds of fires in future, including military capacity we might have lost in recent years”.

=== Saddleworth Moor ===
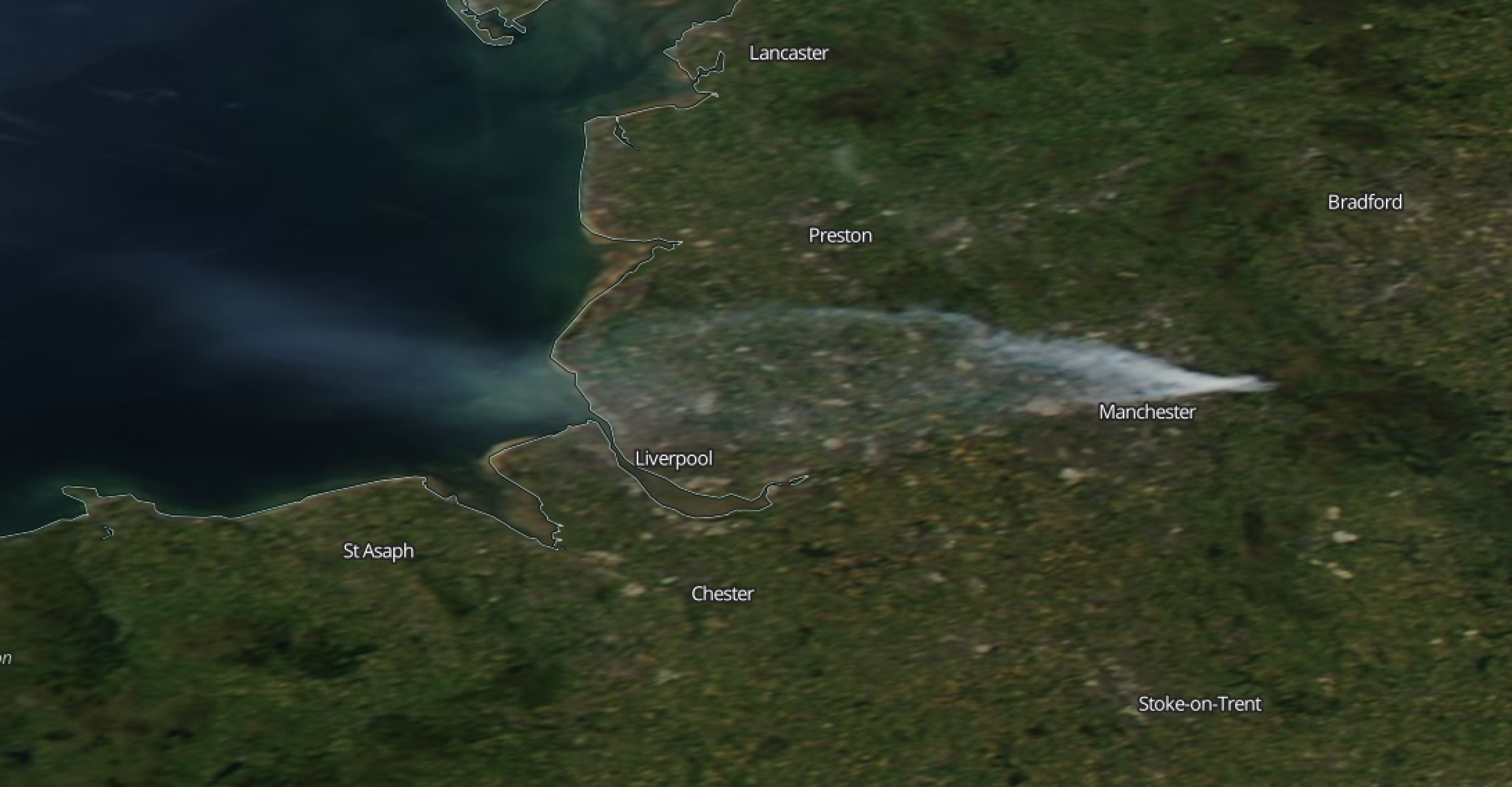
NASA satellite image of smoke rising from fires on Saddleworth Moor on 27 June 2018

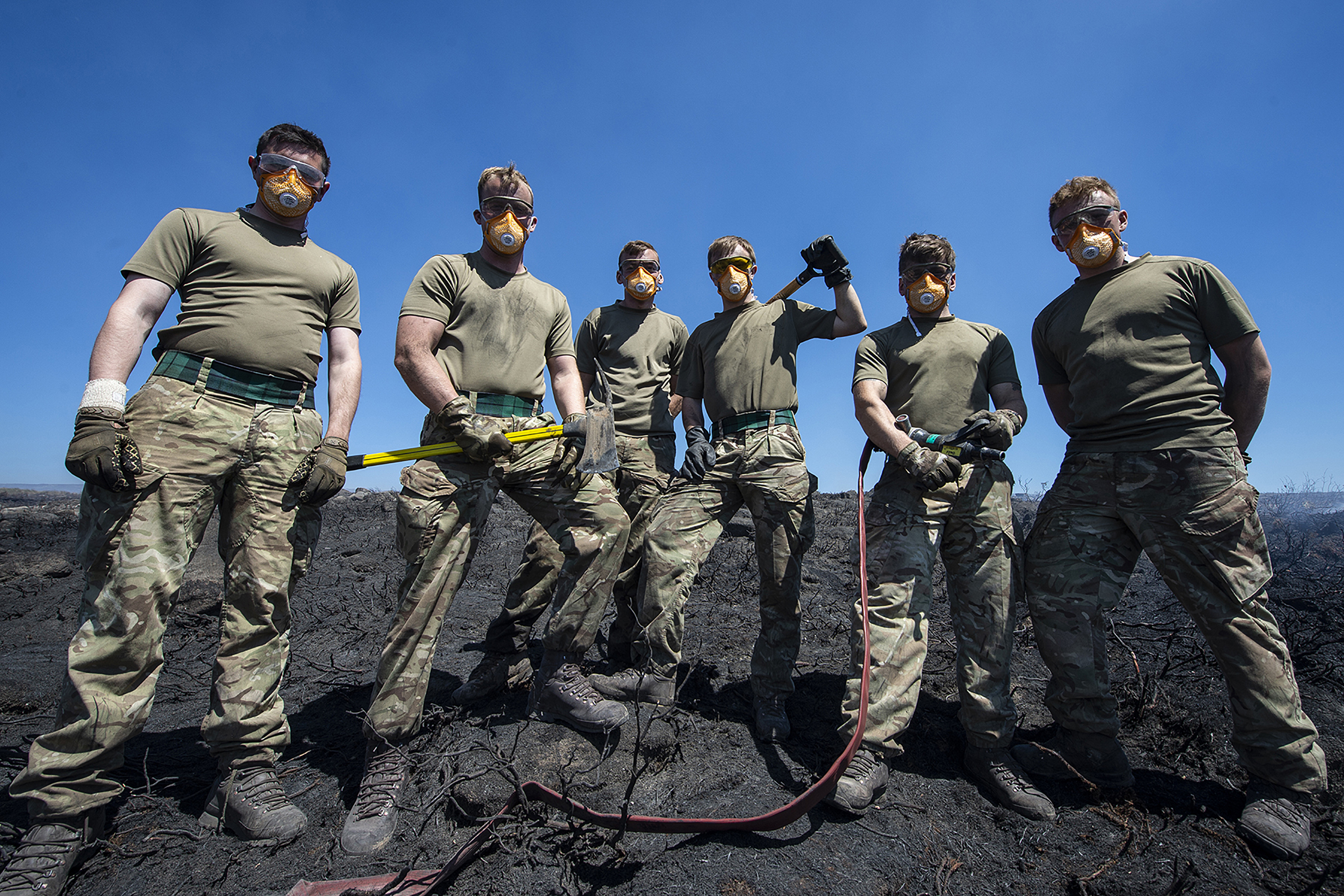
Soldiers from the Royal Regiment of Scotland providing assistance to firefighters on Saddleworth Moor.

Fire first broke out on Saddleworth Moor, between Sheffield and Manchester, on 24 June 2018, but that fire was extinguished later that same day. But the next day, pockets of the fire re-ignited, perhaps from burning of peat which had dried out deep; this began to burn out of control from 26 June, and a major incident was declared that day. By 27 June, the moorland fire had grown to cover over 2,000 acres (810 ha) and remained uncontained. Rapidly changing wind speed and direction helped the fire to spread quickly across the dry moorland and complicated efforts to fight the fire, which split into several fronts moving in different directions. Dry peat is also making fighting the fire difficult, as the fire can continue to smoulder underground after being extinguished at the surface, re-igniting the surface later.

After a major incident was declared on 26 June and with the fire rapidly approaching populated areas, around 150 people were evacuated from 50 homes close to the advancing fire, including 34 homes on Calico Crescent in Carrbrook, Stalybridge; it is thought to be the first time a wildfire has forced such an evacuation to take place in the United Kingdom. In the House of Commons on 26 June, Prime Minister Theresa May told MPs that the government was keeping the situation on Saddleworth Moor under "constant review" following the declaration of a major incident in response to the wildfires.

Speaking at the scene of the fire on 27 June, Mayor of Greater Manchester Andy Burnham said that a summertime fire on Saddleworth Moor "isn't unusual", but that the size and scale of this fire "is unlike anything we've seen before". Later that afternoon, assistant chief fire officer of the Greater Manchester Fire and Rescue Service Dave Keelan formally requested military assistance in tackling the fire, including the provision of high-pressure water lines and transportation of firefighters towards front lines, plus Chinook helicopters to transport water pumps up the mountain.

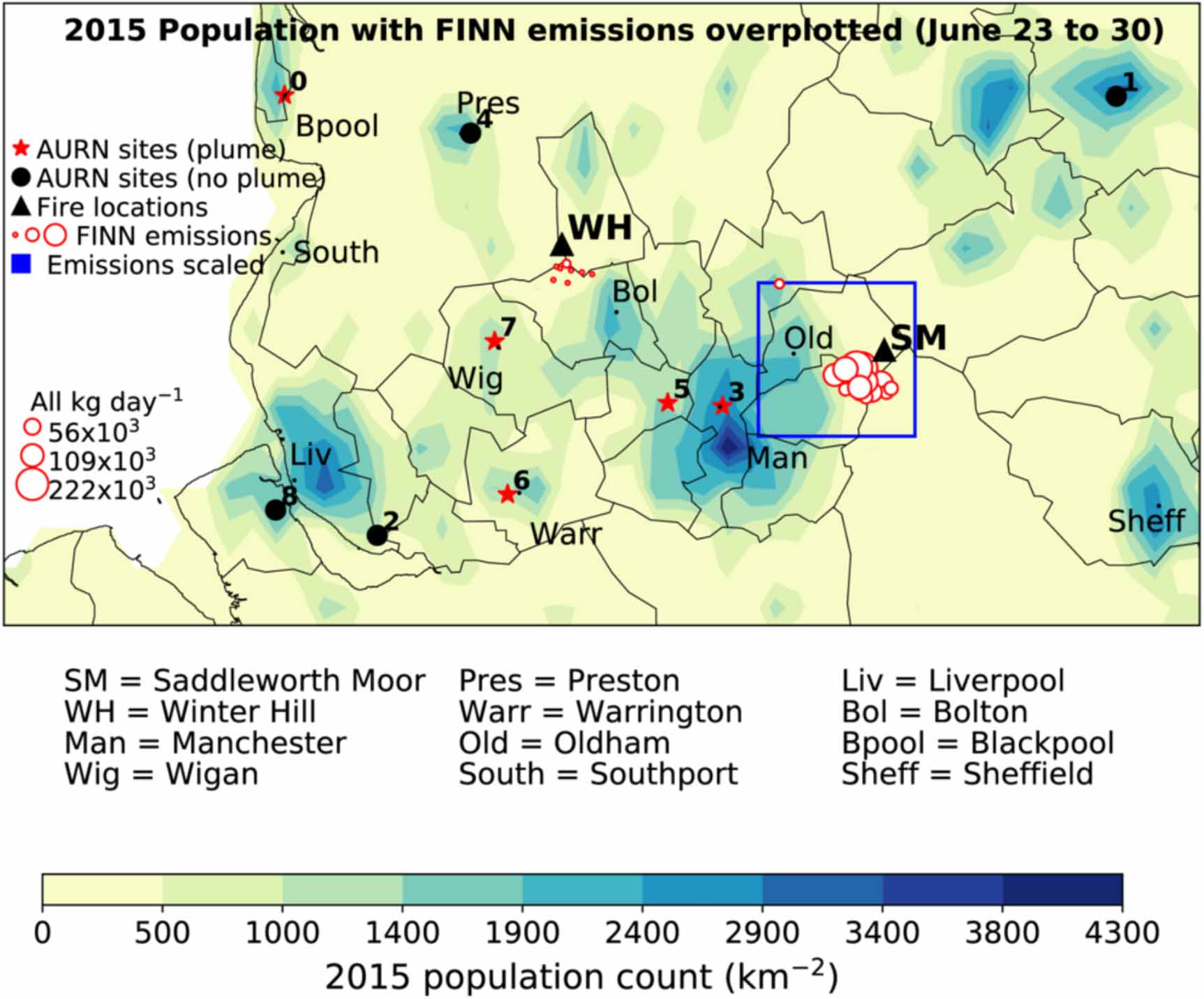
2015 Populations across the Saddleworth Moor region with FINN emissions (Fire INventory from NCAR) overplotted (June 23 - 30)

The fire was near to a densely populated area of northern England. Satellite imagery showed smoke drifting towards Sheffield and Leeds on 25 June, before the wind direction changed and the smoke cloud was redirected over Manchester and towards Liverpool on 26–27 June. As a result, air quality levels across Greater Manchester dropped due to smoke and ash drifting across the city from the fire, forming a widespread haze at ground level. Emergency services supplied dust masks to residents living closest to the fire, in Stalybridge and surrounding areas, on 27 June; four local schools – three primary schools and a secondary school – were closed, and residents were advised to keep their doors and windows closed. One GP at a Manchester surgery told BBC News that he had treated numerous people suffering from respiratory illnesses relating to the fire, including nosebleeds, coughs and eye problems. On 27 June, the burning caused particle pollution to reach as far away as Wigan, Warrington and St Helens - 37 miles away. This pollution reached an eight out of ten on the air quality index with fine particulate concentrations (PM_{2.5}) increasing by over 300% in Oldham and Manchester and up to 50% in areas up to 80 km away.

As night fell on 27 June 29 fire engines and more than 100 firefighters were at the scene of the fire, including crews from Greater Manchester, Cheshire and Derbyshire; two helicopters were in use, and had so far dropped more than 65,000 gallons of water on the fire from above. The Salvation Army arrived at the scene, handing out 1000 bottles of water, 600 Mars bars and sandwiches made from 40 loaves of bread to firefighters. Other charities and individuals brought much food and drinking water to the fire sites.

After three weeks, on 18 July, it was declared the fire was extinguished. In total 7 square miles (18 km^{2}) of moorland were burned and the Manchester fire service declared it one of the busiest periods it has ever faced. Aside from the extensive firefighting effort also recent rainfall had led to the final declaration of the fire being extinguished. One wildlife expert said the effects of the fire could last for up to fifteen years.

=== Winter Hill ===
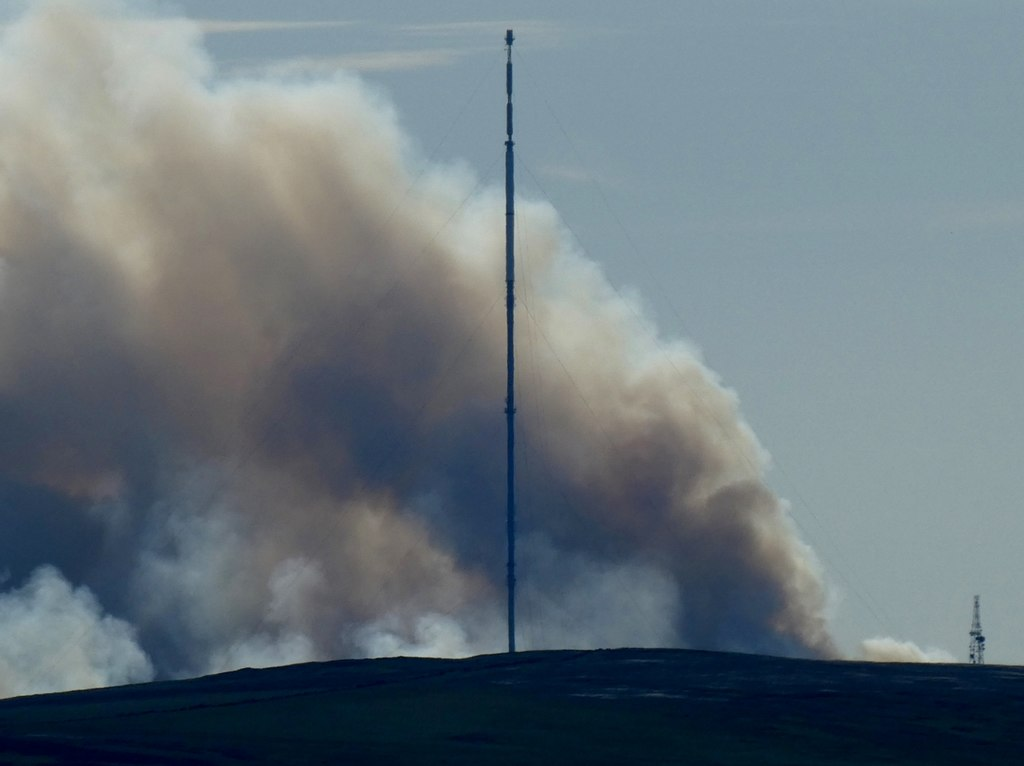
Smoke plumes rising above the 1,015-foot (309 m) Winter Hill TV transistor

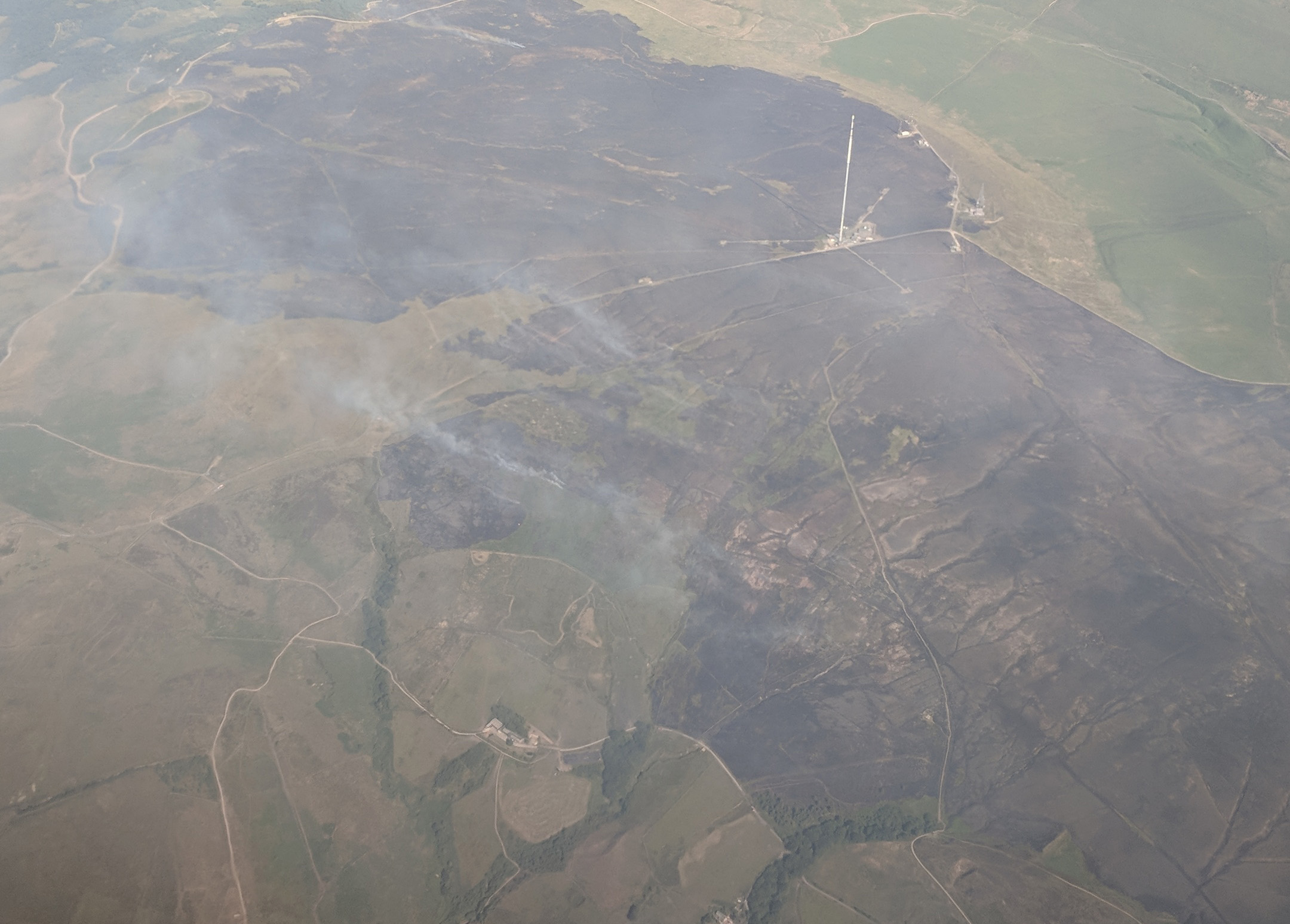
Aerial view showing the extent of damage on 2 July

A large wildfire broke out on Winter Hill, north of Bolton in Greater Manchester, at around 3:20 pm on Thursday 28 June 2018; near the Winter Hill transmitting station. Initially, five fire engines from Greater Manchester and seven from the Lancashire Fire and Rescue Service were sent to tackle the blaze with specialist fire-fighting equipment. They were supported by firefighting teams from United Utilities and volunteers and vehicles from Bolton Mountain Rescue Team, and later other local volunteer teams including Lancaster Area Search and Rescue. By nightfall, that fire had reached more 250 acres (100 ha) in size with a total of fifteen fire crews from Lancashire trying to stop the fire from spreading. The next day, fire services were also assisted by a United Utilities helicopter which was dropping tonnes of water from the nearby Rivington Reservoirs onto the fire. At the time huge plumes of smoke from the moors could be seen from as far away as Wigan, and was measured on pollution instruments as far away as Blackpool. People who were affected by the smoke were advised to keep windows closed and doors shut. The fire also caused a number of roads and footpaths in the area to be closed due to public safety, with firefighters later setting up a 'four-mile no-go zone' around the affected area.

Elsewhere, on 29 June at 2 am other wildfires started near Horrocks Moor Farm, on Scout Road in Bolton. Separately, fifty firefighters were sent there - where the fire was reportedly 1 1/4 miles (2 km) long. On 30 June it was reported this fire had merged with the fire on Winter Hill, and as result the two official fire incidents became one and a major incident was declared. The proximity of the fire to the broadcasting equipment at Winter Hill transmitting station, which has the second greatest coverage of any UK transmitter at around 7 million people, led to fears that it may disrupt television and radio services. The transmitter's owners, Arqiva, issued a statement for radio stations in the area to be on standby and prepare for any interruptions in broadcast. By 2 July 2018, the fire covered over six square miles with up to one hundred firefighters and more than 20 fire engines tackling the blaze. The continuing response was also being supported by volunteers from Bolton Mountain Rescue Team, Bowland Pennine Mountain Rescue Team and Rossendale & Pendle Mountain Rescue Team. That day Andy Burnham visited the site of the fire and said that he would be speaking to the Home Secretary Sajid Javid about the incident and that he wanted to ensure "all necessary resources are available".

The fire was brought under control on 16 July, in total it had spread over 7 square miles (18 km^{2}). The fire service said there was "still significant work to do" as peat was still burning underground and despite recent rainfall even by 23 July the fire was not fully out. The fire service were digging into the ground to make sure the water reaches the burning peat.

On 29 June 2018 a 22-year-old man was arrested for arson with intent to endanger life, on suspicion of starting the initial Winter Hill fire. On 1 July a police helicopter, which was patrolling the area, spotted several people setting grass fires alight in the Healey Nab area close to Winter Hill. Tony Crook, from the Lancashire Fire and Rescue Service, has stated that “Police are now attending that scene, to try to apprehend those arsonists”.

=== Glenshane Pass ===
A large gorse fire broke out in the Glenshane Pass area of the Sperrins in County Londonderry, Northern Ireland, in the early hours of 27 June 2018; the first call to emergency services came at 04:57 am. By the end of the day, five separate fires in the pass had rapidly grown to cover an area of over 1 square mile (640 acres) in total, with firefighters struggling to reach the fire due to extremely high temperatures; elsewhere in Northern Ireland, temperatures reached 29.6 °C on 27 June, marking the hottest June day in the province since 1995. After attempting unsuccessfully to reach the isolated fire on foot for more than an hour during the daytime, firefighters eventually had to be airlifted into the area by helicopter later in the day as temperatures dropped.

Her Majesty's Coastguard and Forest Service Northern Ireland were deployed to assist crews from the Northern Ireland Fire and Rescue Service with tackling the Glenshane Pass fire, with the Coastguard providing helicopters to transport firefighters to and from the scene and drop water on the fire from above. Multiple fire crews from Ballymena, Cookstown, Dungiven, Kilrea, Maghera and Magherafelt fire stations were sent to the scene of the fire, alongside a specialist Command Support Unit from Belfast. Roads through the Glenshane Pass remained open during the fire, although smoke hindered visibility, with the Northern Ireland Weather and Flood Advisory Service warning motorists to take care and prepare for possible short-notice travel disruption.

=== Vale of Rheidol ===
On 26 June 2018, two crews from the Mid and West Wales Fire and Rescue Service responded to a large grass and, later, forest fire alongside the A4120 in the Vale of Rheidol close to Aberystwyth in Ceredigion. The road remained open during the fire. The first calls to emergency services regarding the fire were logged at around 11:30 am, with temperatures in the area reaching 30 °C on what was the hottest day of the year to date for that area.

The wildfire caused the suspension of heritage rail services on the preserved Vale of Rheidol Railway, with 150 passengers stuck on a train close to Devil's Bridge railway station having to be rescued and returned to Aberystwyth by bus. Rail services remained suspended the following day as fire crews continued to fight the fire in a valley close to the railway line. Owing to the fire's inaccessibility by road, a specialised Permaquip road-railer was sent to tackle the conflagration from the railway line, although it is now largely being left to burn itself out. The cause of the wildfire has not yet been determined.

=== Mynydd Cilgwyn ===
On 2 July homes were evacuated as firefighters fought a mountain fire at Mynydd Cilgwyn in Carmel, was one of several such fires that broke out at that day, including blazes at Talsarnau, Rhiw, Llanycil and Bangor Mountain in Gwynedd and Newborough Forest on Anglesey.

=== Epping Forest ===
Forty pumps and 225 firefighters from the London Fire Brigade attended a large fire on Wanstead Flats and Leyton Flats, part of Epping Forest on the 15 July 2018. 110 calls were made to the fire service and the fire burnt 100 hectares (247 acres). 100 firefighters had to remain for two days to dampen down the ground. The fire was a threat to a large residential area, over 100 people were evacuated, and one firefighter was injured.

=== Somerset ===
A number of wildfires were reported in Somerset. In the early hours of 26 June, three crews from the Devon and Somerset Fire and Rescue Service attended two unrelated garden fires in Peasedown St John; later that day, a grass fire was reported on nearby Keel's Hill, forcing the closure of the nearby Bath Road. Several bus routes were cancelled or diverted as a result. At around 10:35 am on 27 June, a 300 square metres (3,200 sq ft) grass fire broke out on an embankment alongside the A4174 Ring Road, Longwell Green which was closed for several hours as a result as crews from the Avon Fire and Rescue Service brought the fire under control. Footage of the fire filmed from a passing lorry later went viral on Facebook.

=== Staffordshire ===
From late afternoon on 30 June, up to 45 firefighters from Staffordshire Fire and Rescue Service batted a blaze between Thorncliffe, Shawfield and Royal Cottage in the Staffordshire Moorlands. A further fire broke out in woodland near Alton Towers on 2 July. A separate wildfire broke out over a month later, on the afternoon of 9 August at Upper Hulme. This continued to burn the rest of the month and, at its height, covered a significantly larger area than the two earlier fires in the county. Despite a period of rain, which initially helped, windy conditions meant the fire spread to cover 219 acres by 11 August. Smoke from the fire had reached Sheffield and parts of North Derbyshire, 28 miles away.

=== Devon ===
Later on the morning of 27 June, a large fire broke out at a landfill site in Burlescombe, Devon.

=== Powys ===
On 27 June, a small grass fire broke out on Breidden Hill close to Admiral Rodney's Pillar, between Welshpool and Llanymynech in Powys. A crew from the Mid and West Wales Fire and Rescue Service attended the wildfire, arriving at 11:52 am, and it was contained within two hours; the cause of the fire is not currently known.

=== Ben Bhraggie ===
Firefighters were called in the early hours of 7 July to a fire near the Duke of Sutherland monument. The fire was at a tree plantation near Golspie, Sutherland and smoke from it covered a wide area.

=== Worcestershire ===
First broke out on 2 July 2018 on Beacon Hill and at Earnslaw Quarry. Thirty firefighters attended and Hereford and Worcester Fire and Rescue Service said the fire was in a "difficult location". Six fire engines and crews, from Malvern, Worcestershire, Worcester, Upton-upon-Severn, Droitwich, Whitchurch, Ledbury and Ross-on-Wye, attended, plus two restricted access vehicles and a water carrier. It said officers had been called to 17 grass fires in the past fortnight.

=== Yorkshire ===
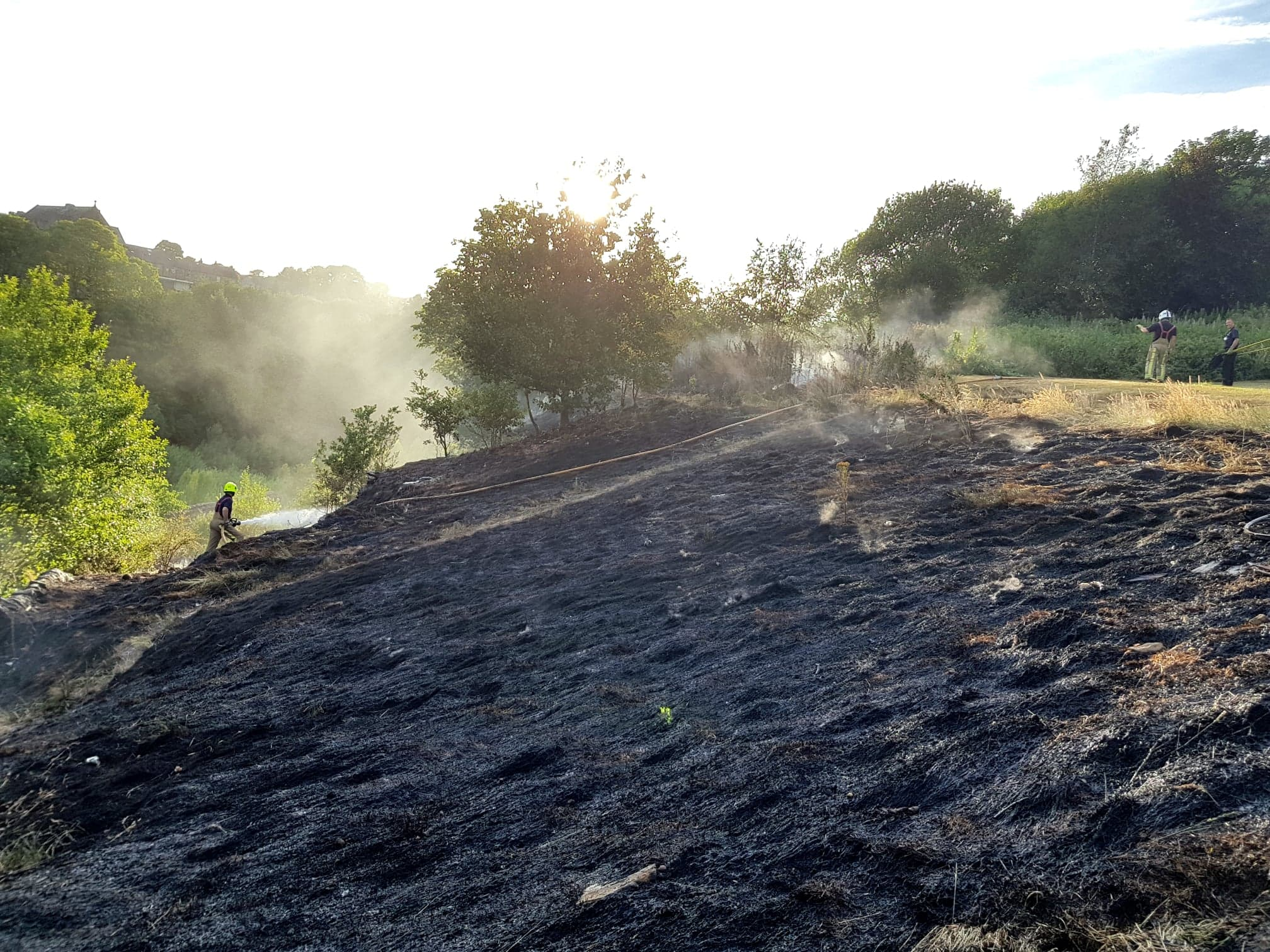
Firefighters tackling a large wildfire close to residential buildings in Boothtown, Halifax on 1 July

South Yorkshire Fire and Rescue attended two large grass fires on 27 June. The first, off Crookes Lane in Carlton, Barnsley, was reported at around 3 pm and was contained by 7:30 pm, and is believed to have been started deliberately. The second, in Middlewood, Sheffield, was first reported at around 8 pm, sending smoke billowing across the city.

Between 28 June and 1 July, the West Yorkshire Fire and Rescue Service (WYFRS) responded to 678 incidents, of which 438 incidents (65% of all callouts) were in relation to wildfires. This included 99 separate wildfire incidents in West Yorkshire on 28 June alone. One particularly severe wildfire broke out on a hillside above Old Lane in Boothtown, Halifax on 1 July, burning within 20 metres (66 ft) of three residential blocks of flats on Canterbury Crescent before being brought under control. In a press release on 2 July, the WYFRS described the ongoing series of wildfires across the county as "unprecedented".

On 2 September, a bushfire broke out in the Parkwood Springs area in the north of Sheffield. The wildfire, which was later determined to have been caused by arson, burned for around five hours before being contained. The fire destroyed around 700 m^{2} (7,500 ft^{2}) of steep hillside shrubland habitat on the hills above the city, as well as numerous buildings and structures at the abandoned Sheffield Ski Village site.

=== Wiltshire ===
On 2 July 2018, fire crews were called to a fire in Dinton, Wiltshire. The fire broke out in a field off Hinton Road with the blaze encompassing around 150 square metres (1,600 sq ft) of land. The farmer helped firefighters by using a plough to create a fire break to stop the flames from spreading. Firefighters also dampened the hedges around to also prevent spreading.

=== Highlands ===
A wildfire occurred near Temple Pier in Drumnadrochit of the Highlands on 2 September 2018.

== Other impacts ==
The Derbyshire Fire and Rescue Service, Ruth George (Member of Parliament for High Peak), and others called for the cancellation of The Lights Fest, a mass release of sky lanterns scheduled to be held on 28 July at Buxton Raceway, near the Derbyshire moors. Event organisers responded by stating that the type of lanterns used did not pose a fire risk, but the event was eventually cancelled.

A study by researchers at the University of Leeds concluded that raised air pollution levels due to wildfire smoke drifting across Sheffield and Manchester from the Saddleworth Moor fire in 2018 had likely contributed to at least 24 premature deaths.

== See also ==
- List of wildfires
- 2018 British Isles heat wave
