= Greater Manchester Fire and Rescue Service =

Fire and rescue service in north west England

Operational area
- Country: England
- County: Greater Manchester

Agency overview
- Established: 1974
- Employees: 2,100 (2025)
- Chief Fire Officer: Dave Russel
- Motto: Ever Vigilant

Facilities and equipment
- Stations: 41
- Engines: 48

Website
- www.manchesterfire.gov.uk

Greater Manchester Fire and Rescue Service (GMFRS) is the statutory emergency fire and rescue service for the metropolitan county of Greater Manchester, England. It is part of the Greater Manchester Combined Authority.

GMFRS covers an area of approximately 493 square miles (1,280 km^{2}). The service has 41 fire stations which until 2006 were organised into three territorial Area Commands (South, East and West), each one with an Area Command Headquarters, based at Stretford, Rochdale and Bolton respectively. When the brigade altered the command area's structure they divided the three area commands from South, East and West to 11 Borough Commands, aligned to the ten local authorities in the county: Bolton, Bury, Manchester (North/South), Oldham, Rochdale, Salford, Stockport, Tameside, Trafford and Wigan. As of 2025, the service employs 2,100 personnel.

The service's headquarters is located in Pendlebury, Salford.

== History ==
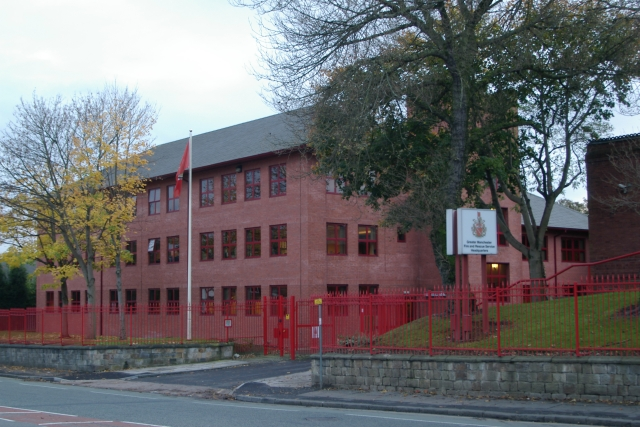
Headquarters in Pendlebury

The service would be created when the county of Greater Manchester came into being in 1974. Changing the name, from the previous Manchester Fire Brigade, into Greater Manchester County Fire Service . Around the late 70s to early 80s though, Greater Manchester County Fire Service turned into Greater Manchester Fire Service. the change in 1974 would happen to many other fire services across the united kingdom. with many brigades merging/dissolving.

The name change in 2004, to Greater Manchester Fire & Rescue Service, reflected the growing number of roles the service now has. Many services across the United Kingdom would change to Fire & Rescue Service. This change was inspired by new primary legislation for England and Wales, The Fire and Rescue Services Act 2004.

The service was originally administered by the Greater Manchester County Council, but when this was abolished in 1986, administration of the service was taken over by a joint authority of the ten Metropolitan Boroughs of Greater Manchester, known as the "Fire and Rescue Authority". Five members are appointed by Manchester City Council, two each by Bury and Rochdale Metropolitan Borough Councils, and three each by the other seven borough councils of Greater Manchester.

In 2017, the service came under considerable controversy on the night of the Manchester Arena bombing due to arriving two hours later than the police after the bombing. A report by Lord Bob Kerslake found that GMFRS deployed units only at 00:15 after conversation was overheard of armed police being sent in to scout the area one-and-a-half hours earlier. Then-Chief Fire Officer Peter O'Reilly apologised for the delay in response, although blaming the Greater Manchester Police for the delay, citing an "information vacuum" from the force and for not correctly liaising with the ambulance and fire services following the bombing.

The service, alongside the Lancashire fire service, were among the first responders to the Saddleworth Moor fire on 24 June 2018, managing to extinguish the fire on the same day, a normal event said to happen on the moor on a hot summer's day, but because of the heatwave starving the land of rain and thus drying the peat, the fire reignited on the next day, soon burning out of control, and following a declaration of a major incident the day after that, requiring the evacuation of 50 houses nearby. With the service having never fought a moorland fire on the scale of this fire, mutual aid was sought out from seven other fire services across the north of England, including Cumbria, Tyne and Wear, Nottinghamshire, Humberside and Warwickshire, and following a request from assistant chief fire officer Dave Keelan, military assistance came to help extinguish the wildfire, of which it eventually was declared three weeks later on 18 July. A similar fire on Winter Hill, north of Bolton in Lancashire, breaking out on 28 June and being declared under control on 16 July, a merger of two previous wildfires that directly threatened, but never affected a transmitting station on the hill, was also responded to by both the Greater Manchester and Lancashire services.

== Performance ==
Every fire and rescue service in England and Wales is periodically subjected to a statutory inspection by His Majesty's Inspectorate of Constabulary and Fire & Rescue Services (HMICFRS). The inspections investigate how well the service performs in each of three areas. On a scale of outstanding, good, requires improvement and inadequate, Greater Manchester Fire and Rescue Service was rated as follows:

HMICFRS Inspection Greater Manchester
Area	Rating 2018/19	Rating 2021/22	Rating 2023/24	Description
Effectiveness	Requires improvement	Requires improvement	Good*	How effective is the fire and rescue service at keeping people safe and secure from fire and other risks?
Efficiency	Requires improvement	Requires improvement	Good*	How efficient is the fire and rescue service at keeping people safe and secure from fire and other risks?
People	Requires improvement	Good	Good*	How well does the fire and rescue service look after its people?

∗ For 2023/24 the judgement criteria were more granular, breaking into 11 categories: all rated "Good" except "Responding to major and multi‑agency incidents", rated "Adequate".

== See also ==
- Fire service in the United Kingdom
- List of British firefighters killed in the line of duty
