= Typhoon Prapiroon (2018) =

Pacific typhoon in 2018

Typhoon Prapiroon (Florita)
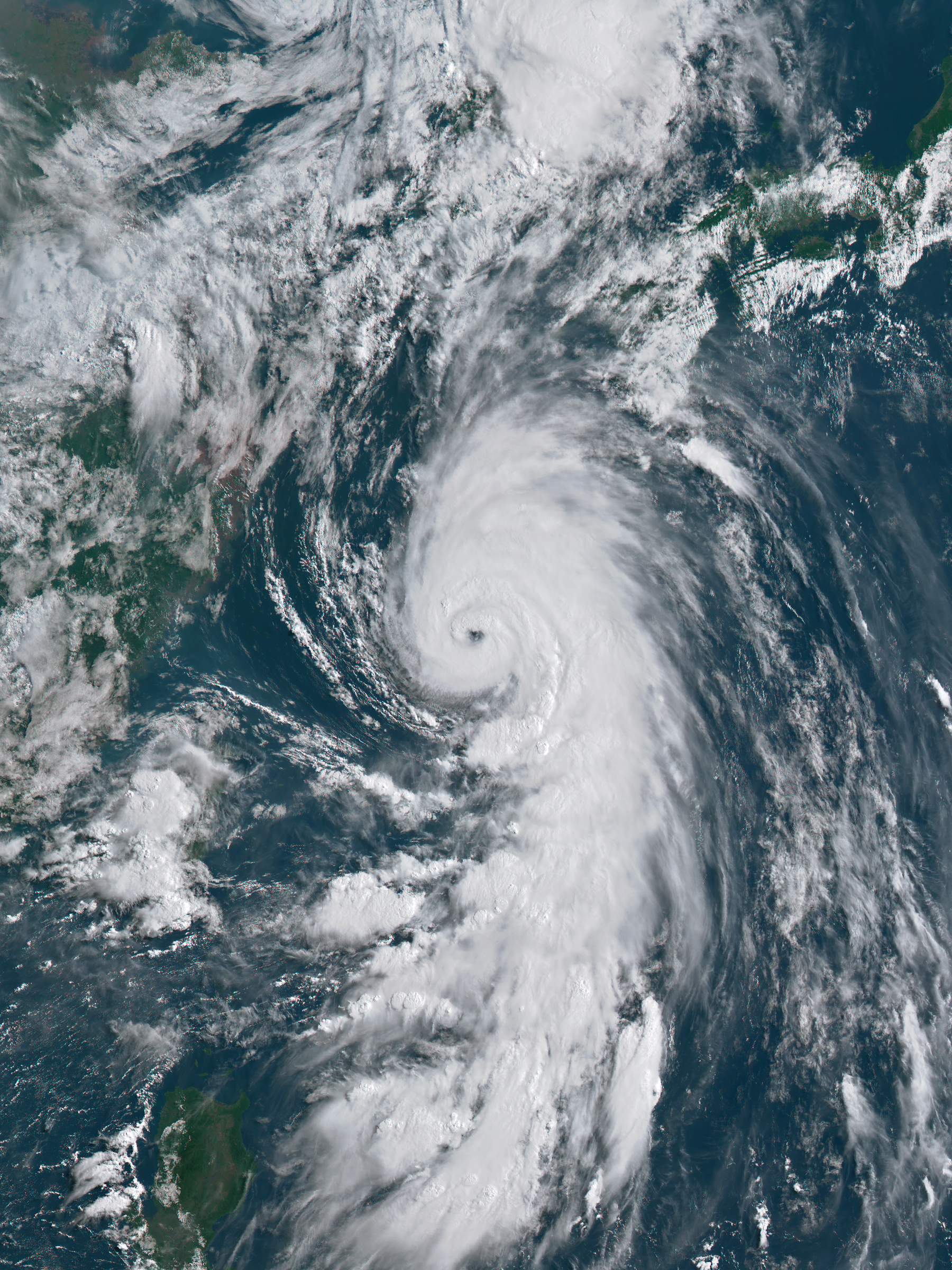
- Prapiroon shortly before peak intensity north of Ryukyu Islands on July 2

Meteorological history
- Formed: June 28, 2018
- Extratropical: July 4, 2018
- Dissipated: July 5, 2018

Typhoon
- 10-minute sustained (JMA)
- Highest winds: 120 km/h (75 mph)
- Lowest pressure: 960 hPa (mbar); 28.35 inHg

Category 1-equivalent typhoon
- 1-minute sustained (SSHWS/JTWC)
- Highest winds: 150 km/h (90 mph)
- Lowest pressure: 960 hPa (mbar); 28.35 inHg

Overall effects
- Fatalities: 4
- Damage: $10.1 million (2018 USD)
- Areas affected: Japan, Korean Peninsula
- IBTrACS
- Part of the 2018 Pacific typhoon season

Typhoon Prapiroon, (Note: The name Prapiroon (Thai: พระพิรุณ, [pʰraʔ˦˥ pʰi˦˥(ʔ) run˧]) was contributed by Thailand and refers to Varuna, a Hindu god of sea and rain, in Thai.) known in the Philippines as Severe Tropical Storm Florita, was a Category 1 typhoon that worsened the floods in Japan and also caused impacts in neighboring South Korea in early July 2018. The storm formed from an area of low pressure near the Philippines and strengthened to a typhoon before entering the Sea of Japan. The seventh named storm and the first typhoon of the annual typhoon season. Prapiroon originated from a low-pressure area west of Okinotorishima on June 28. Tracking westwards, it rapidly upgraded into a tropical storm, receiving the name Prapiroon due to favorable conditions in the Philippine Sea on the next day.

Prapiroon had a good upper-level flow despite the presence of dry air, which typically hindered its development. The tropical storm shifted more northwestward heading towards the Ryukyu Islands. JMA upgraded into a severe tropical storm on July 1 and left PAR on that day also. As it moves towards Japan, Prapiroon crosses through the island of Kume in the Ryukyu Islands. Prapiroon later further intensified as a category-1 typhoon. Shortly after reaching peak intensity, Prapiroon weakened into a tropical storm after passing closely between Japan and the Korean Peninsula. It then turned extratropical on July 5 before dissipating on the following day.

Prapiroon brought heavy rain and strong winds to southwestern Japan. Moisture transported northward by the typhoon later interacted with a frontal system, enhancing precipitation across Kyushu, Shikoku, and western and central Honshu, leading to widespread, devastating floods and mudflows.

== Meteorological history ==
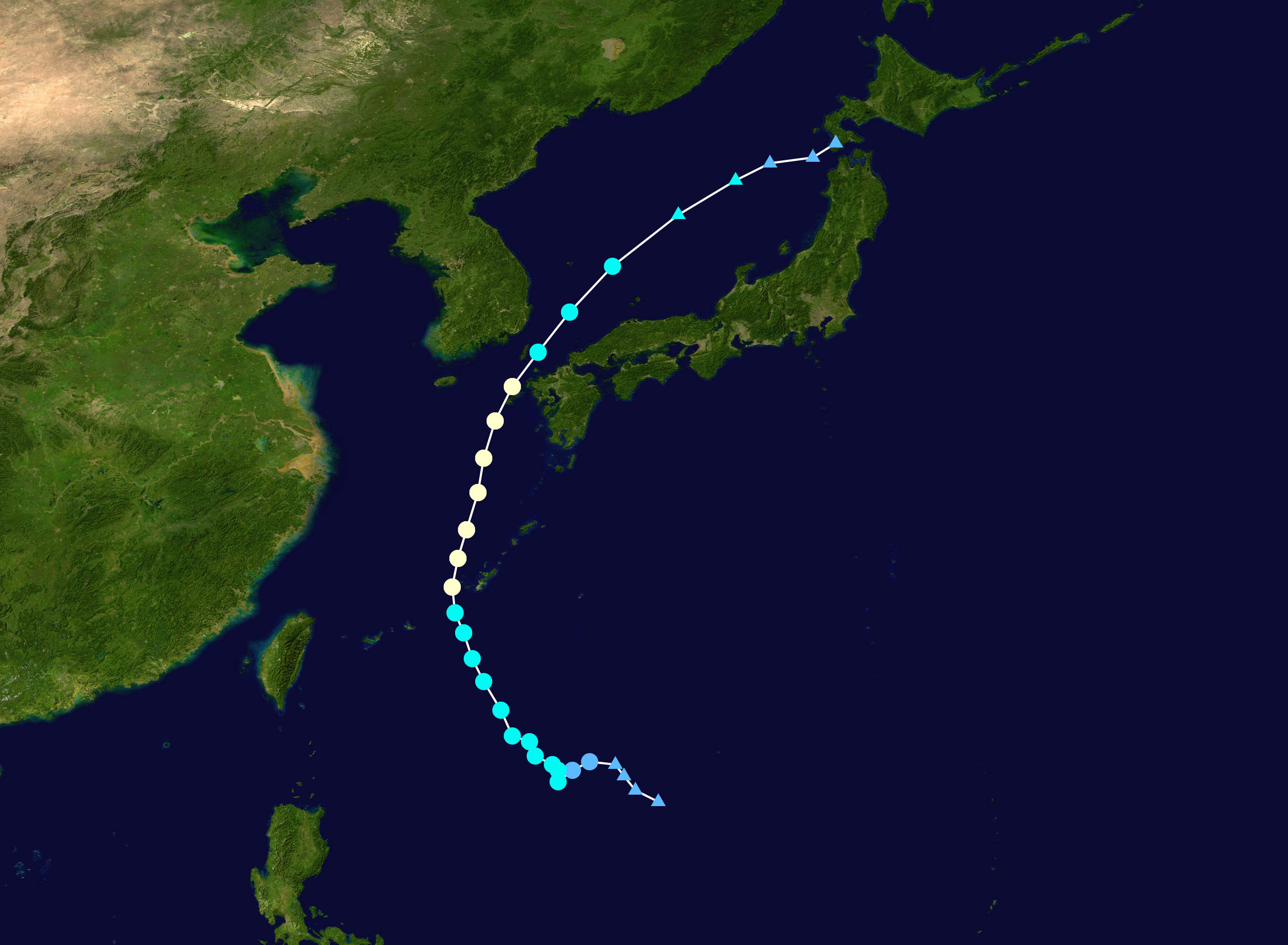
Map plotting the storm's track and intensity, according to the Saffir–Simpson scale Map key Saffir–Simpson scale Tropical depression (≤38 mph, ≤62 km/h) Tropical storm (39–73 mph, 63–118 km/h) Category 1 (74–95 mph, 119–153 km/h) Category 2 (96–110 mph, 154–177 km/h) Category 3 (111–129 mph, 178–208 km/h) Category 4 (130–156 mph, 209–251 km/h) Category 5 (≥157 mph, ≥252 km/h) Unknown Storm type Tropical cyclone Subtropical cyclone Extratropical cyclone, remnant low, tropical disturbance, or monsoon depression

On June 27 at 20:00 UTC, the Joint Typhoon Warning Center (JTWC) began monitoring a system in the Philippine Sea, giving it a low development potential. The next day at 00:00 UTC, the Japan Meteorological Agency (JMA) began issuing advisories on a tropical depression, with the JTWC upgrading its development potential to medium at 00:30 UTC. The depression continued over favorable conditions as it was steered by a mid-level subtropical high-pressure area, and on the same day at 12:00 UTC, the JTWC began issuing warnings on Tropical Depression 09W. At 18:00 UTC, the PAGASA began issuing warnings on the tropical depression, giving it the local name Florita 3 hours later at 21:00 UTC.

On June 29 at 00:00 UTC, the JMA upgraded the depression to a tropical storm, giving it the name Prapiroon. Prapiroon had good upper-level outflow, though dry air present in the area negatively affected its development. At 03:00 UTC the same day, the JTWC upgraded Prapiroon to a tropical storm as it was located approximately 440 nautical miles (815 km; 505 mi) south-southeast of Kadena Air Base. Prapiroon then turned to the northwest, and on July 1 at 00:00 UTC, the JMA upgraded Prapiroon to a severe tropical storm. On the same day at 06:00 UTC, the PAGASA issued its final warning on Prapiroon as it exited the Philippine Area of Responsibility. Later that day, a ragged eye became apparent, and at 21:00 UTC, the JTWC upgraded Prapiroon to a typhoon. Prapiroon continued developing aided by favorable conditions, and on July 2 at 00:00 UTC, the JMA upgraded Prapiroon to a typhoon. At 18:00 UTC the same day, both the JMA and the JTWC assessed that Prapiroon had peaked in intensity, with 10-min winds of 65 knots (120 km/h; 75 mph), 1-min winds of 80 knots (150 km/h; 90 mph), and a minimum central pressure of 960 hectopascals (28 inHg). After peaking, Prapiroon began to weaken and turn to the northeast, with the JMA downgrading it to a severe tropical storm on July 3 at 06:00 UTC as conditions for development became unfavorable. The JTWC downgraded Prapiroon to a tropical storm at 15:00 UTC as its low-level circulation became exposed, with central convection becoming elongated. Prapiroon's western semicircle became completely devoid of deep convection, and by July 4 at 00:00 UTC, the JMA further downgraded it to a tropical storm. The JMA later issued its final advisory on Prapiroon at 06:00 UTC as it became extratropical, with the JTWC doing so later at 15:00 UTC. Prapiroon's extratropical remnants dissipated just south of Hokkaido the next day.

== Preparations and Impact ==
Radar animation of the event from 3–8 July nationwide; the animation starts with Typhoon Prapiroon affecting western areas of the country followed by successive rounds of heavy rain along the Meiyu front

=== Japan ===
Five people were injured by the winds from the typhoon. A woman was blown away by the strong winds of the typhoon and died at a hospital she was sent to later. The typhoon also caused damages on Old Gorin Church, which as designated as heritage site four days prior, and caused damages to the stained glass in Kuroshima Catholic Church. Agricultural damage in Okinawa Prefecture were about ¥49.39 million (US$446,000).

=== South Korea ===
A typhoon watch was issued in Jeju Island, while a strong-wind warning was issued in Heuksando, as well as wind warning for Hongdo in preparation for Prapiroon. 33 flights were also cancelled, including more than 25 ferry services have also been cancelled

One person from South Korea was killed by the storm. Authorities confirmed that the fatality is a 53-year-old Thai woman, after being struck by lightning. One other person was declared missing. Five residental buildings were reportedly damaged, while more than 50 vehicles and 61 buildings, were flooded.

== See also ==
- Weather of 2018
- Tropical cyclones in 2018
