= 2018 British Isles heatwave =

Period of unusually hot weather in the summer of 2018

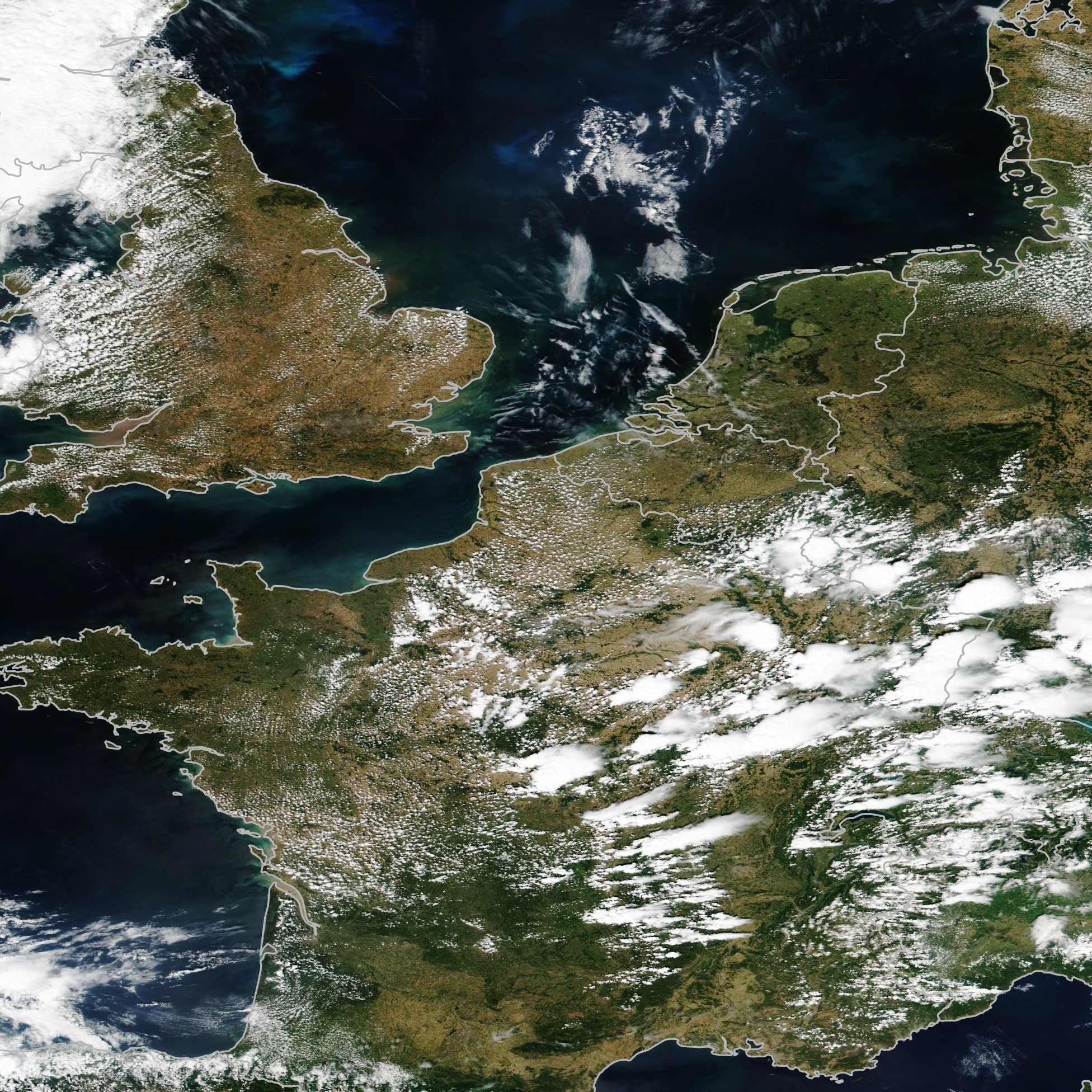
- The parched landscape of the United Kingdom and northwestern Europe, 15 July 2018

Meteorological history
- Duration: 22 June - 7 August 2018
- Heat event
- Max temp: 35.3 °C (95.5 °F), recorded at Faversham, Kent on 26 July 2018

Overall effects
- Areas affected: British Isles

The 2018 Britain and Ireland heatwave was a period of unusually hot weather that took place in June, July and August. It caused widespread drought, hosepipe bans, crop failures, and a number of wildfires. These wildfires worst affected northern moorland areas around the Greater Manchester region, the largest was at Saddleworth Moor and another was at Winter Hill, together these burned over 14 square miles (36 km^{2}) of land over a period of nearly a month.

A heat wave was officially declared on 22 June, with Scotland and Northern Ireland recording temperatures above 30 °C (86 °F) for the first time since the July 2013 heat wave. The British Isles were in the middle of a strong warm anticyclone inside a strong northward meander of the jet stream, this was part of the wider 2018 European heat wave. The Met Office declared summer 2018 the joint hottest on record together with 1976, 2003 and 2006, until it was beaten by 2025.

== Weather earlier in 2018 ==
Spring started with record cold in early March with the 2018 Great Britain and Ireland cold wave. There were three spells of summer heat afterwards, starting in mid-April. The April 2018 heatwave began on 18 and 19 April. St James's Park in London recorded the country's hottest April day in nearly 70 years when temperatures reached 28.1 °C (82.6 °F). The unseasonably hot weather lasted for four days. On 22 April, the hottest London Marathon ever was recorded, with the temperature reaching 24.3 °C (75.7 °F). No national records were broken, but many places set local record high temperatures for April.

After a cooler period from the end of April, temperatures started to rise again during early May. The May Day bank holiday was the hottest on record, with west London recording 28.9 °C (84.0 °F). A few days later, temperatures began to fall, but were still above average. Temperatures began to rise even higher towards the end of May. It sparked violent thunderstorms leading to flash flooding, giving some parts of the country their first measurable precipitation during May. On 27 May, 81 millimetres (3.2 in) of torrential rain fell at Winterbourne, West Midlands, causing a flash flood. The majority of the country was hot and sunny. May 2018 was one of the warmest and sunniest on record in the UK.

Before the heat wave, anticyclonic conditions prevailed across the UK. May and early June had been much warmer and drier than average, the latter being the driest since 1925 due to a persistently strong Azores High. This high-pressure block prevented Atlantic low-pressure weather systems from reaching the British Isles.

== Summer heat wave ==
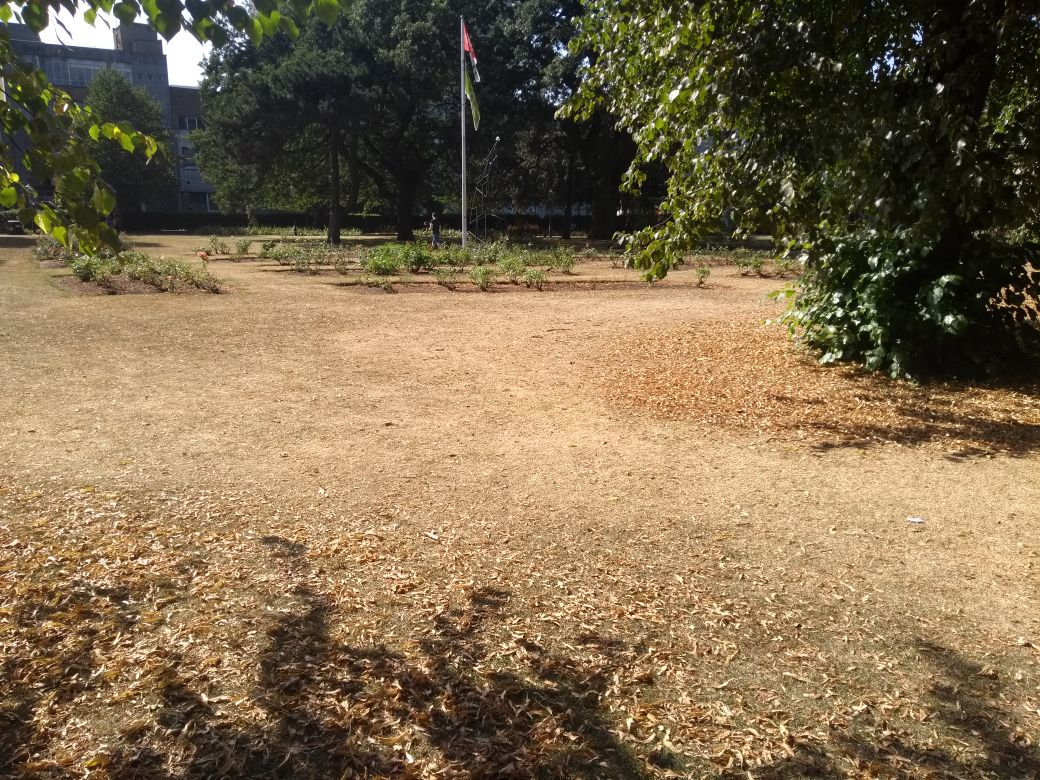
East Park, Southampton on 25 July

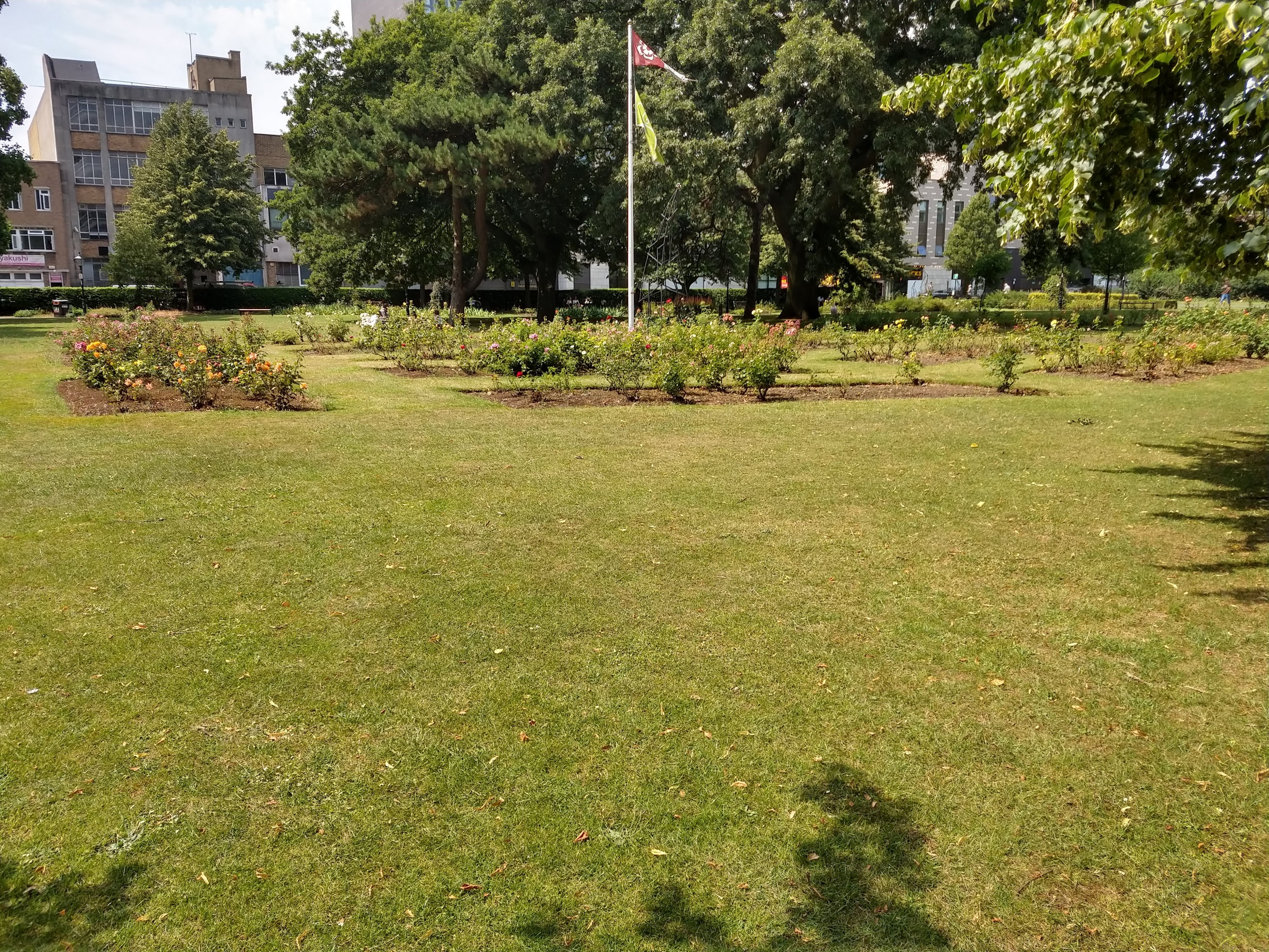
The same location one year later, showing a more typical appearance for the season

The heat wave began on 22 June 2018 as high pressure built across Ireland and the UK. Temperatures gradually rose, and new records were set in towns and cities across Britain and Ireland. These include Glasgow in Scotland, Shannon in Ireland and both Belfast and Castlederg in Northern Ireland.

This temperature rise was part of a heat wave that spanned the entire Northern Hemisphere. The heat wave had seen the hottest night ever recorded on Earth in Oman, with the lowest temperature recorded at 42.6 °C (108.7 °F), and the deaths of at least 33 people in Canada.

Temperatures across Ireland's midwest region rose above 30 °C (86 °F) for five consecutive days in late June, with Shannon Airport recording a peak temperature of 32 °C (90 °F) on 28 June.

Wildfires began to break out across England. The two largest fires broke out at Saddleworth Moor on 25 June, and at Winter Hill on 28 June, the former being England's largest in living memory. As of September 2018, arrests were made on the charge of arson, yet the cause of these fires was undetermined. However, the factor that allowed the fires to establish was the persistently hot and breezy weather conditions. This dried out vegetation and the underlying peat, allowing it to easily burn.

On 2 July, forecasters predicted that high pressure would continue over the UK and that the heat wave could continue for another two weeks. On 5 July, a weak weather front arrived from the west, but was mostly halted over Ireland and the Irish Sea. This caused some scattered showers over the Pennines, and a thunderstorm that caused flash floods in Tunbridge Wells. The weather also affected roads nationwide, and gritters were mobilised due to the asphalt concrete softening under the extreme heat. In Heaton, Newcastle, a man sank into a melted road and required a rescue from firefighters, and a bin lorry sank into a road in Newbury, Berkshire.

On 10 July, a weak cold front crossed Britain from north to south, bringing low cloud levels and scattered showers. However, this cool air was quickly heated by the sun the next day, increasing temperatures yet again. The Met Office announced that the highest temperature on 23 July was 32.5 °C (90.5 °F), recorded at Santon Downham in Suffolk.

Total drought conditions were recorded at 21 of Met Éireann's weather stations in Ireland between 22 May and 14 July, with partial droughts and periods of unusually dry conditions recorded at 15 other locations.

June and July saw many places in the Republic of Ireland receive well below average rainfall. Gurteen in Galway received just 35% of its expected rainfall, while Dublin received just 28% of its expected precipitation.

=== Effects on the economy ===
The long period of dry warm weather, although with unpleasant levels of humidity, strongly boosted the domestic tourism trade during this period. The official Visit Britain body forecast the number of international visitors to the UK would increase by around 15% from the USA alone, as the effect of the worldwide Royal Wedding publicity fed through into fine summer weather and late holiday bookings. Hotels in competing Mediterranean resorts, such as Ibiza, were forced to slash their prices as demand from British and Irish tourists declined sharply as people decided to holiday across Britain and Ireland. Remoter resorts and destinations benefited from visitors' attempts to escape the domestic crowds, and rural Ireland reported a dramatic increase in tourism with an average of 70% occupancy rates at smaller establishments.

Many companies concerned with outdoor activities reported the usual boost in sales that comes from a good summer, and estate agents reported that the warm dry summer was also helping their industry. Fresh produce growers such as the soft fruit sector were largely unaffected by the lack of rain, with British Summer Fruits chairman Nick Marsto telling Horticulture Week trade magazine that the... "soft-fruit sector has largely avoided any adverse effects.

=== Health effects ===
The heatwave added to pressure on the NHS, on A&E departments and elsewhere. Shadow Health Secretary Jon Ashworth said, "I am very worried about the impact on the NHS of this summer. We know that this hot weather, (...) affects very elderly, vulnerable people. We know that asthma sufferers suffer particularly badly in the weather. [Ashworth mentioned his first hand experiences shadowing a hospital consultant] with lots of elderly vulnerable people being admitted to A&E, lying on trolleys because there's no beds in the hospital".

There were fears of over 1,000 excess deaths during the heat wave. The Environmental Audit Committee of MP's reported fears 7,000 heat-related UK deaths annually by 2050 unless the government acts promptly. Chair of the committee, Mary Creagh said, "The government must stop playing pass the parcel with local councils and the NHS and develop a strategy to protect our ageing population from this increasing risk". At risk, groups include elderly people, small children and people with heart and/or lung conditions. There were calls for government regulations to protect an ageing population from the effects of heat, effects include increased risk of death.

During the 2003 European heat wave in some areas of the UK there were 42% increased deaths in nursing homes and the MP's wanted hospitals and care homes to be inspected to find out if they could cope with extreme heat. The TUC and others called for regulations about maximum workplace temperatures. Frances O'Grady of the TUC stated, "With heatwaves becoming more common, we need clear and sensible rules to protect working people. We've had legal minimum temperatures at work for a long time, which work very well. The government must now act quickly on the recommendation by MPs for maximum limits on how hot workplaces can get".

Dress codes for work and school uniform policy should be relaxed during heatwaves to improve work productivity and school learning. Ministers withdrew money for climate change adaptation officers in local authorities. Lack of "joined-up thinking" between government departments and lack of communication between the government and the public added to the death toll. Heatwave alerts are put out only if temperatures are over 30 °C, but heat-related deaths start at 25 degrees. There were excess deaths during the 2018 heat wave but the cause is not yet known.

=== Drought ===
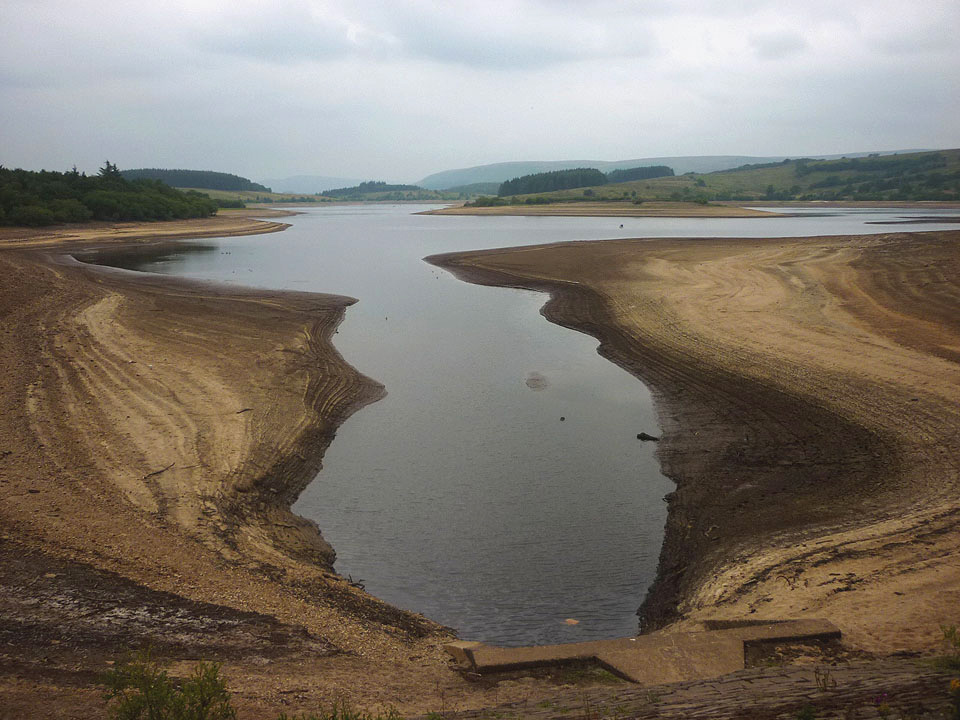
Stocks Reservoir on 12 July

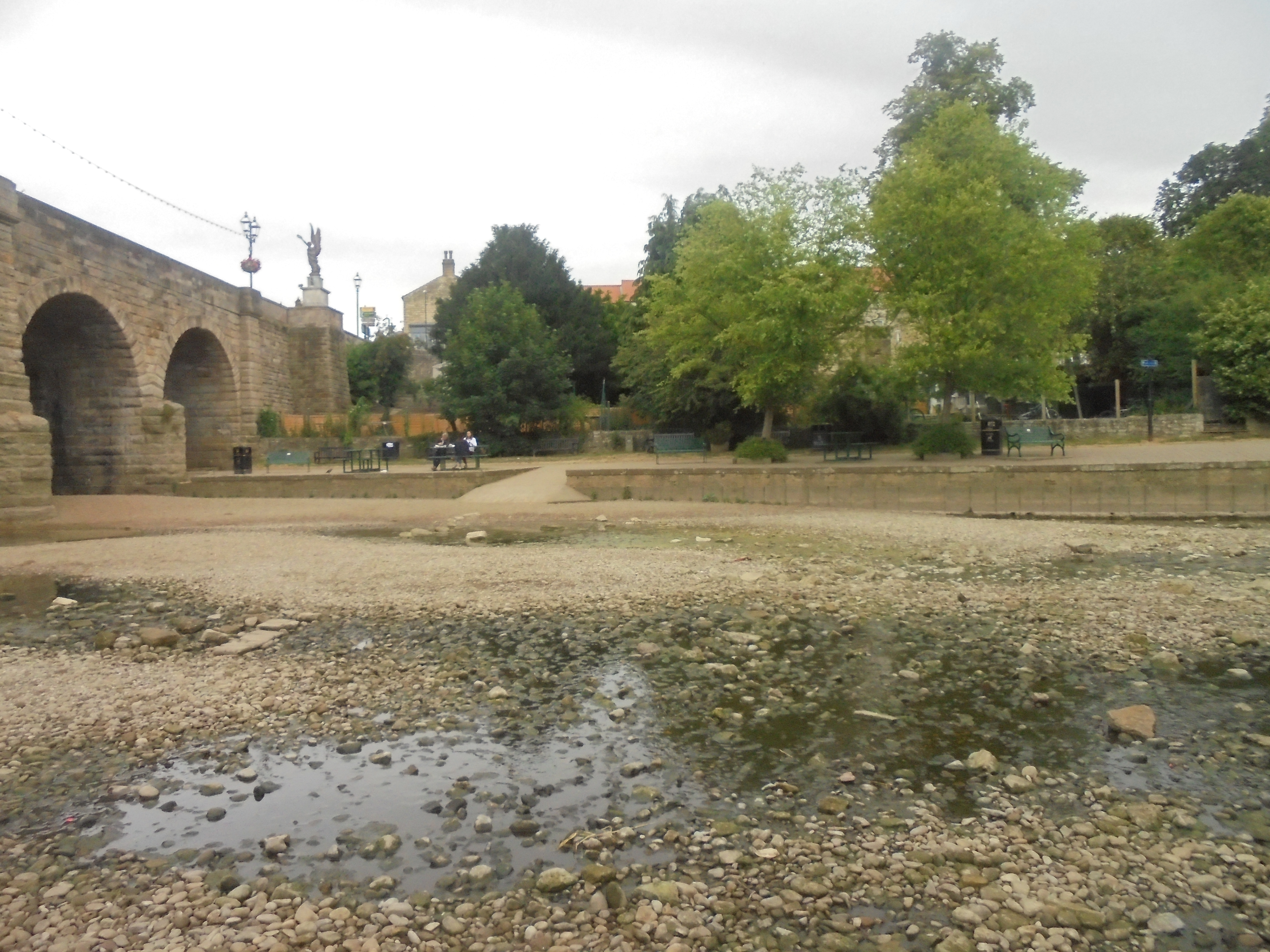
The River Wharfe at Wetherby by Wetherby Bridge having largely dried up

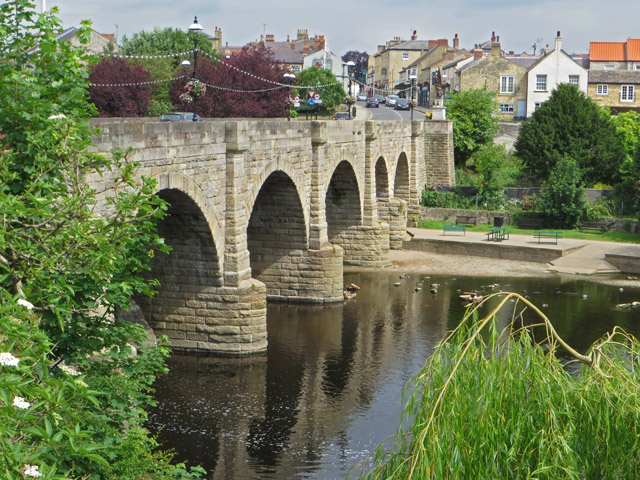
The same location in 2015, showing a more typical appearance for the season

On 29 June, Northern Ireland Water introduced the first hosepipe ban in Northern Ireland since 1995. Other water companies also had supply problems, such as United Utilities, with 500 million litres (110 million imperial gallons) more than usual being used on 1 July.

On 5 July in the Republic of Ireland a state of absolute drought was declared because there had been no rainfall at 96% of its weather stations in the previous two weeks.

On 6 July, a hosepipe ban was put in place across Greater Dublin initially for six weeks, however the ban was extended to include the rest of the country. The ban then remained in place until September. On 19 July, the Northern Ireland ban was lifted.

=== Crop failures ===
Crop	Yield, vs 2012–17 average
Barley (Spring)	▼10%
Barley (Winter)	▼2%
Wheat	▼6%

The heat wave affected many crops, and there was concern for the wheat and barley harvests. Cases included wheat dying of drought before it could set seed, and withering of grass intended for livestock grazing, so that dairy cattle had to be grazed on land intended to grow hay or silage for winter feed for the cows. By July, president of the National Farmers Union Guy Smith described the crops as "being parched to the bone". Smith further discussed the risk posed by depleted reservoirs that would normally be used for irrigation, and stated that there was a potential risk to vegetable production should the weather continue.

=== Sporting events ===
A number of sporting events experienced unusual conditions as a result of the heatwave. The 2018 Open Championship which was held from 19–22 July at Carnoustie, Scotland was played with unusually brown, dry and sunbaked fairways and brown rough. The India cricket team toured England during the heat wave, with their tour match against Essex being reduced from four days to three because of the high temperatures.

=== Archaeological discoveries ===
The dry weather caused patterns of vegetation to be revealed, indicative of Roman and pre-Roman settlements. Drainage ditches that had surrounded Iron Age hillforts and Roman settlements became filled in once those settlements were no longer in use, meaning they have a deeper quantity of topsoil and, thus, retain moisture for plants for longer. The use of aerial images to identify archæological sites through cropmarks has been a methodology employed by archaeologists for decades. The National Monuments Service of the Irish Department of Culture, Heritage and the Gaeltacht said that the increased use of aerial drone photography and the exceptional dry weather was leading to some remarkable discoveries.

The Royal Commission on the Ancient and Historical Monuments of Wales observed such indications of historical settlements across Wales, including at Castell Llwyn Gwinau in Tregaron, Ceredigion, at the Cross Oak Hillfort near Talybont-on-Usk, at Caerwent, Monmouthshire and newly-discovered settlements near Magor, Monmouthshire and Langstone, Newport.

Similarly, the National Monuments Service of the Irish Department of Culture, Heritage and the Gaeltacht announced the discovery of a possible henge, 200-metre (660 ft) in diameter, near the UNESCO World Heritage Site of Brú na Bóinne, near Newgrange, County Meath.

== Statistics ==
=== Rainfall ===
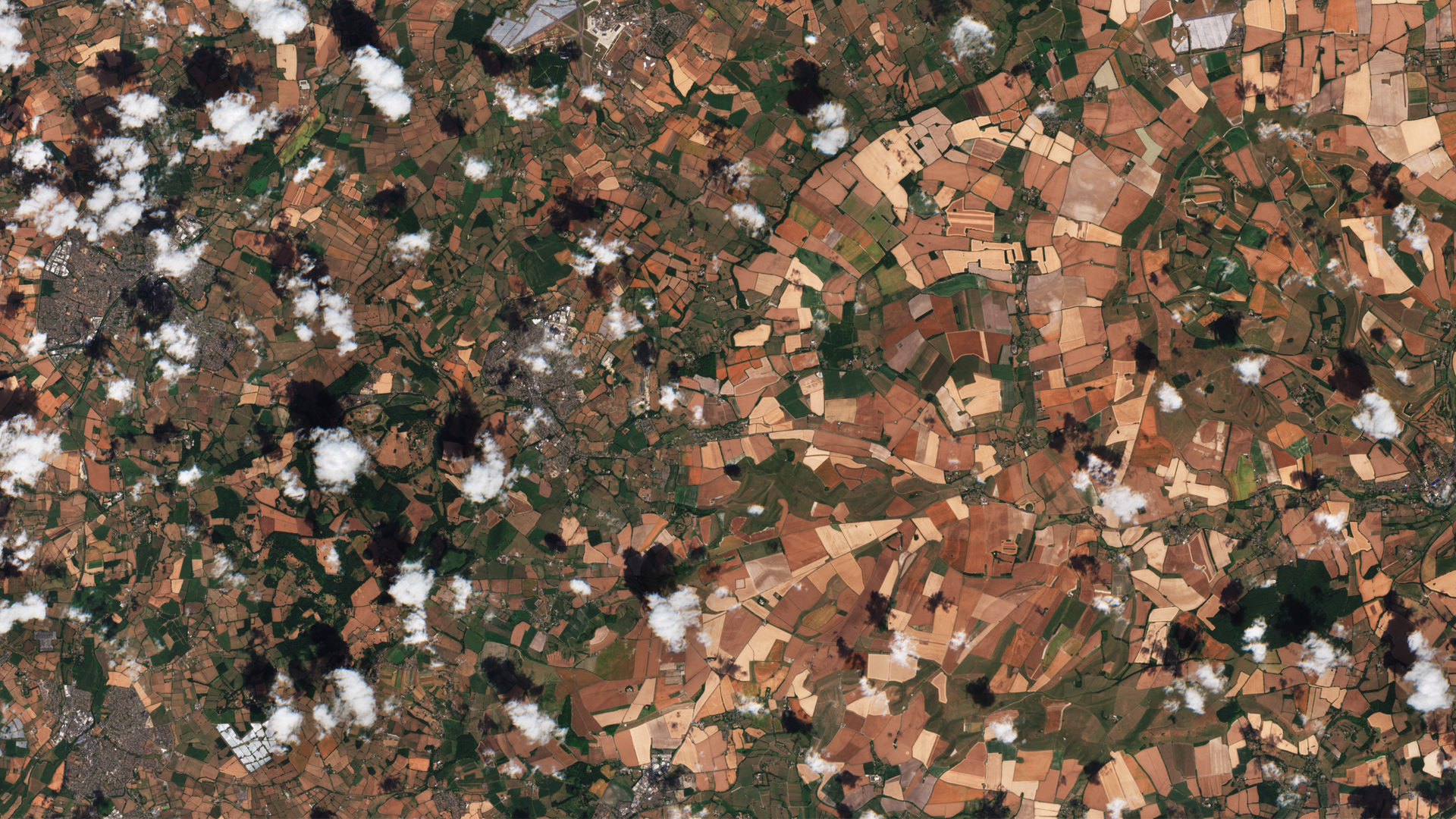
Dry fields around Chippenham, Wiltshire, in July 2018

The drought conditions were not as bad as the mid 1970s drought. June was notably dry, especially after a very dry May. The worst affected regions were England and Wales. Scotland and Northern Ireland also had below average rainfall, but this was unexceptional. Some places had no rain at all.

=== Temperature ===
The Met Office considers the summer of 2018 to be tied with 1976, 2003 and 2006 as the hottest summer on record for the United Kingdom as a whole, with average temperatures of 15.8 °C (60.4 °F). In England, average temperatures for the summer were the highest on record at 17.2 °C (63.0 °F), narrowly ahead of the 17.0 °C (62.6 °F) average in 1976. However, in the CET records (Central England Temperature records that go back to 1659), 2018 comes in 5th behind 2003, 1995, 1826 and 1976.

==== June ====
In Wales and Northern Ireland, June 2018 was the warmest June ever recorded and in England and Scotland, June 2018 ranks within the five warmest on record. In the Central England region, the CET is a long running temperature series, with records back to 1659. 2018's temperature was 16.1 °C (61.0 °F), meaning it ranks as the 18th warmest June recorded in England in the past 359 years, also being the warmest since 1976.

==== July ====
July 2018 was again, a very hot month, with the Central England Temperature showing that July 2018 is the fourth-hottest month recorded since 1659. It also was 138% more sunny than average being the 6th sunniest July since 1929.

== See also ==
- Drought in the United Kingdom
- 1976 British Isles heatwave
- 1955 United Kingdom heatwave
- 2003 European heatwave
- 2006 European heatwave
- 2018 North American heat wave
- 2018 Northeast Asia heat wave
- 2018 European heatwave
