= 2018 Japan floods =

Heavy rain disaster that occurred in July 2018 in Japan

2018 Japan floods 平成 30 年７月豪雨 (Heavy rain in July Heisei 30)
- Radar animation of the event from 3–8 July nationwide; the animation starts with Typhoon Prapiroon affecting western areas of the country followed by successive rounds of heavy rain along the Meiyu front
- Date: 28 June 2018 – 9 July 2018
- Location: Japan, primarily Shikoku and western Honshu
- Deaths: 225 fatalities, 13 missing
- Property damage: ¥1.09 trillion (US$9.86 billion)

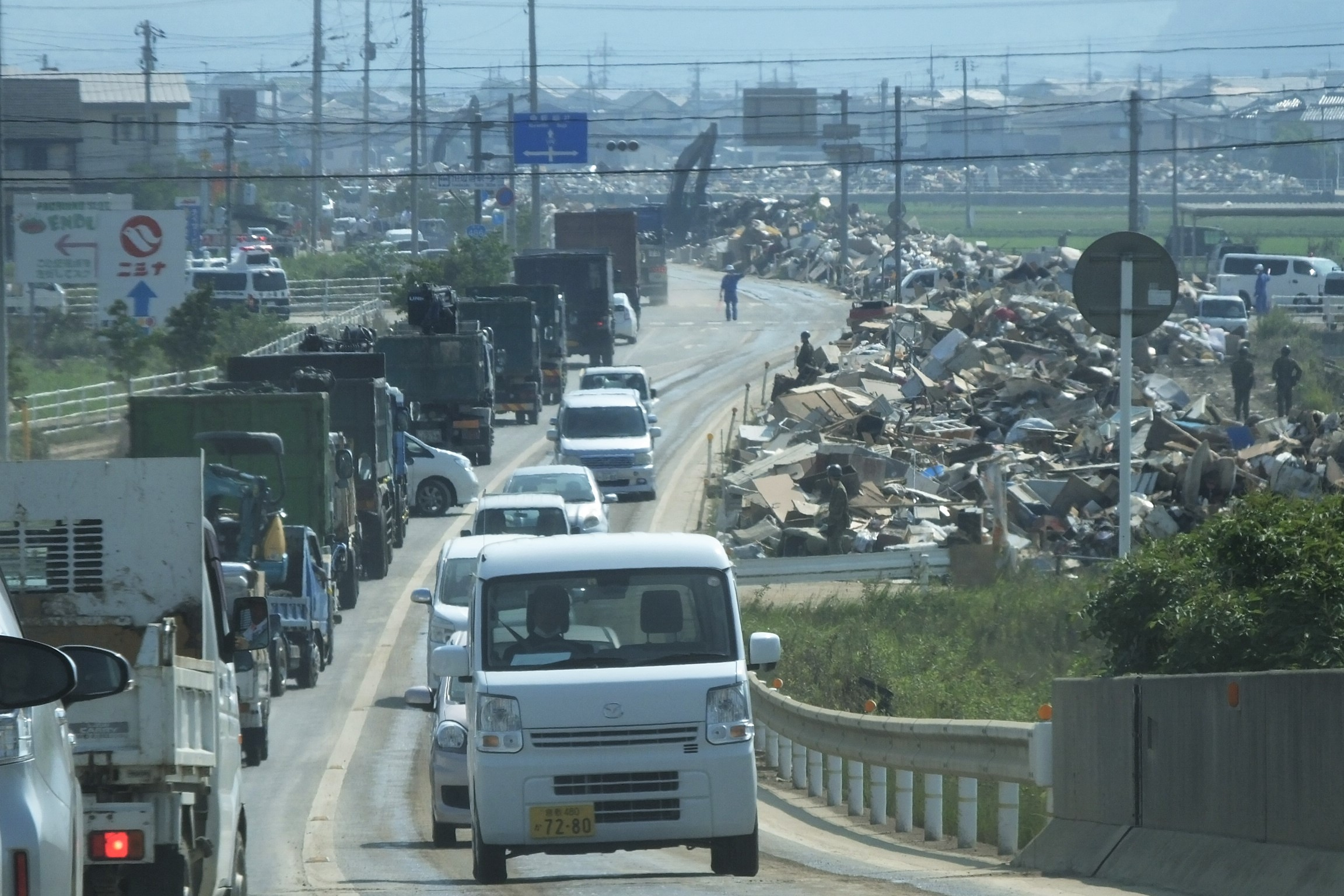
Mabi, Kurashiki, Okayama

In late June through mid-July 2018, successive heavy downpours in southwestern Japan resulted in widespread, devastating floods and mudflows. The event is officially referred to as Heisei san-jū-nen shichi-gatsu gōu (平成30年7月豪雨; "Heavy rain of July, Heisei 30") by the Japan Meteorological Agency. As of 20 July, 225 people were confirmed dead across 15 prefectures with a further 13 people reported missing. More than 8 million people were advised or urged to evacuate across 23 prefectures. It is the deadliest freshwater flood-related disaster in the country since the 1982 Nagasaki flood when 299 people died.

Approximately 54,000 members of the Japan Self-Defense Forces, police and firefighters searched for the people trapped or injured in landslides and flooding triggered by the heavy rain, while the Japanese government set up a liaison unit at the crisis management center of the prime minister's office to gather information.

== Impact ==
Ten-day rainfall summary of the event from 28 June to 8 July (in Japanese)

Rainfall accumulations reached to 1,852.5 mm in Umaji, Kōchi

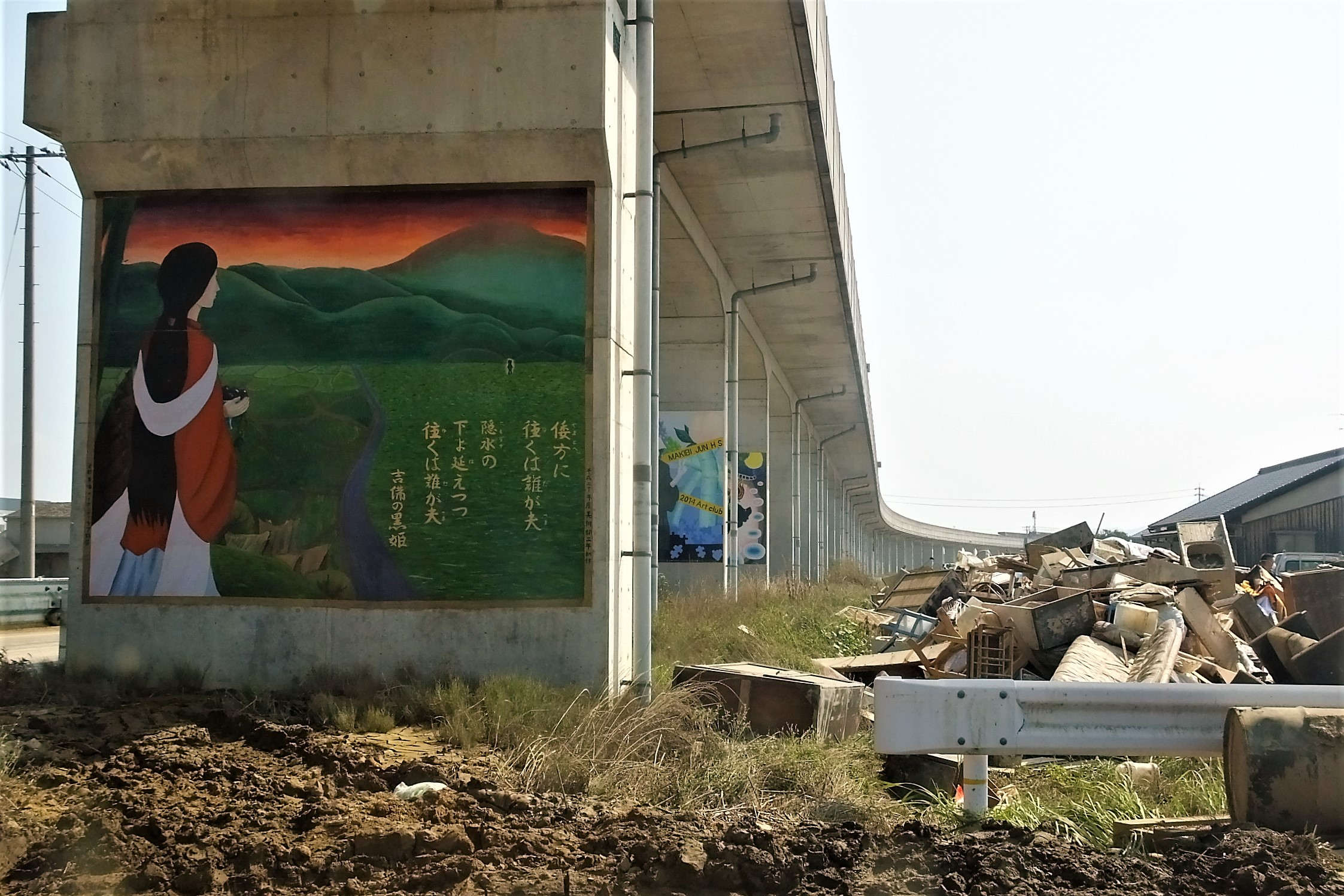
Mabi, Kurashiki, Okayama

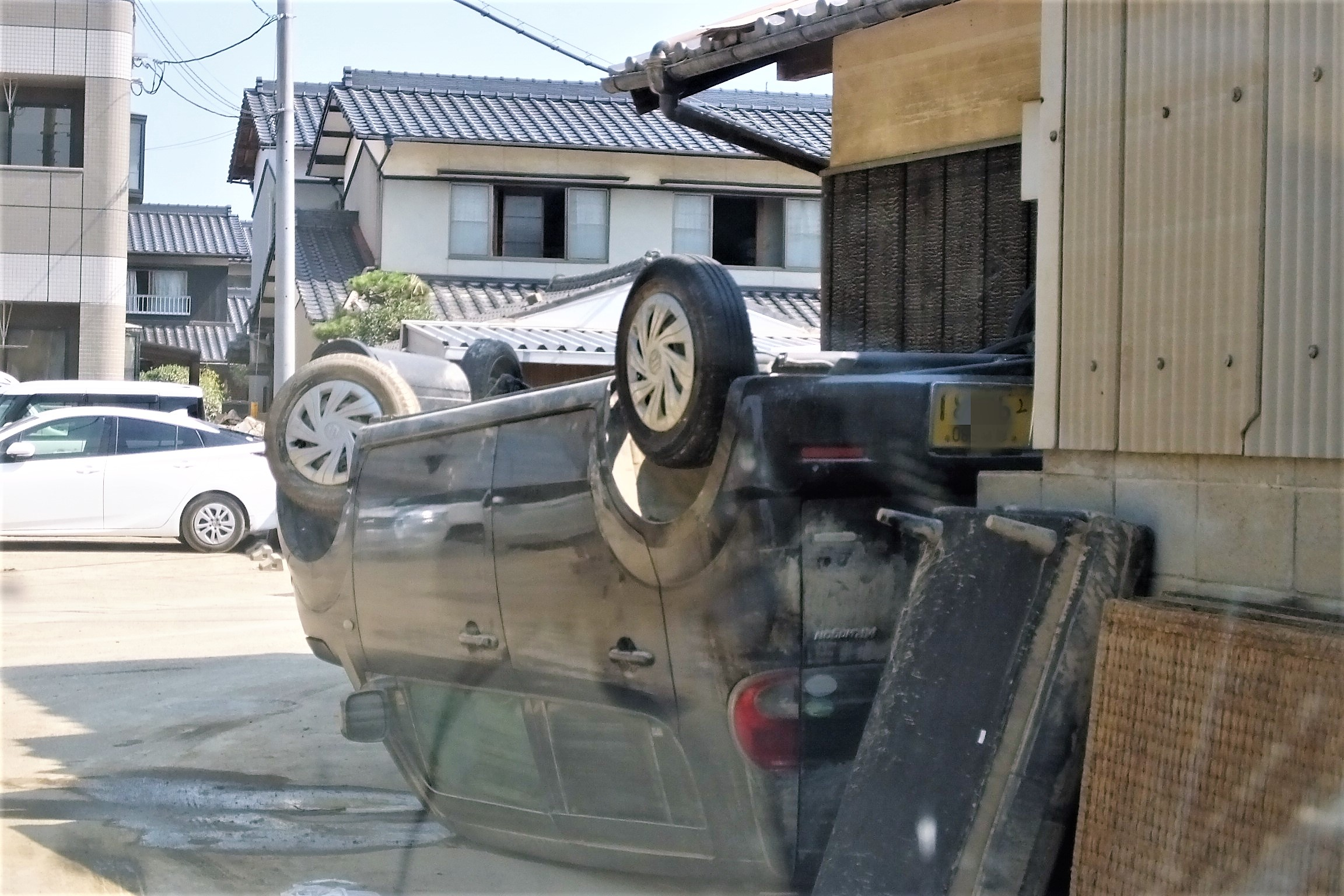
Mabi, Kurashiki, Okayama

On 28 June 2018, a seasonal Meiyu front extending west from a non-tropical low near Hokkaido became stationary over Japan. Multiple rounds of heavy rain occurred in the subsequent days, primarily in northern Kyushu. On the 3rd of July Typhoon Prapiroon brought heavy rains and winds to southwestern Japan. The surge of moisture brought north by the typhoon interacted with and enhanced precipitation along the front in Kyushu, Shikoku, and western and central Honshu. Enhanced rainfall extended as far west as Okinawa Prefecture. Large swathes of these areas saw 10-day rainfall accumulations in excess of 400 mm (16 in). Deadly floods began on 5 July, primarily in Kansai region which was struck by a deadly earthquake three weeks prior. Accumulations peaked at 1,852.5 mm (72.93 in) in Shikoku.

Multiple areas saw their greatest one-hour and three-day rainfall totals on record. Some areas were hit by more than 1,000 mm (39 in) of rain, prompting the Japan Meteorological Agency (JMA) to issue emergency heavy rain warnings (Note: An emergency heavy rain warning is issued in advance of extreme rain events with the potential of being "the worst in decades".) for eight prefectures: Okayama, Hiroshima, Tottori, Fukuoka, Saga, Nagasaki, Hyogo, and Kyoto. This marked the largest issuance of these warnings since their implementation. An official at the JMA described the event as "heavy rain at a level we've never experienced".

The torrential rain caused landslides and flash flooding, with water levels reaching 5 m (16 ft) in the worst hit areas. Motoyama, Kōchi, saw 584 mm (23.0 in) of rain between 6 and 7 July. One town in Kōchi measured 263 mm (10.4 in) of rain in two hours. Mount Ontake observed its greatest three-day rainfall on record at 655.5 mm (25.81 in). Although the Yura River remained within its banks in northern Kyoto Prefecture, an embankment built after Typhoon Tokage in 2004 prevented runoff from flowing into the river. This inadvertently led to flooding in Maizuru after the flood gate was closed.

As the rain lessened on July 9, high temperatures reaching 30 °C (86 °F), coupled with some 11,200 households without electricity, raised concerns over heatstroke and unsafe drinking water.

Hiroshima prefecture alone had 1,243 mudslides in 2018, which is more than the entire nation's total in an average year. Ehime had 419 in 2018, results were not broken down by month, but its inferred that most of these were during this major event.

=== Victims ===
Death toll by prefecture as of 20 July 2018

Throughout the affected areas at least 225 people died in various flood-related incidents, primarily due to mudslides, landslides and vehicles being swept away by the flood waters. Many of the dead had ignored evacuation orders, and chose to stay in their homes despite repeated warnings. Police received numerous reports across the country of people trapped in homes buried by landslides, of people being swept away by swollen rivers, and from people trapped in cars. At least ten people were buried inside their homes in Higashihiroshima; rescuers were able to confirm seven survived but remained trapped as of 7 July.

Fatalities and missing person reports by island and prefecture
Island	Prefecture	Fatalities	Missing
Honshū	Gifu	1	0
Honshū	Hyōgo	2	0
Honshū	Hiroshima	113	—N/a
Honshū	Kyoto	5	0
Honshū	Nara	1	0
Honshū	Okayama	61	—N/a
Honshū	Shiga	1	0
Honshū	Tottori	1	0
Honshū	Yamaguchi	3	0
Kyūshū	Fukuoka	2	0
Kyūshū	Kagoshima	2	0
Kyūshū	Miyazaki	1	0
Kyūshū	Saga	2	0
Shikoku	Ehime	26	—N/a
Shikoku	Kōchi	3	0
Unspecified		0	13
Total		225	13

=== Industry ===
By 7 July no bullet trains were running west of Shin-Osaka Station and the West Japan Railway Company officials were uncertain when the trains would be running again. The widespread cancellation of trains stranded numerous travelers; some bullet trains were utilized as temporary hotels. Some automakers (Mitsubishi Motors & Mazda Motor) halted production as the rain and flooding disrupted the companies' supply chains and risked the safety of workers. Other companies such as Daihatsu and Panasonic suspended operations at plants until debris was cleared and the water receded from the factories. The Asahi Aluminium Industrial Company plant in Okayama exploded on July 6, after workers had evacuated during the flooding.

Delivery companies Sagawa Express Co. and Yamato Transport Co, with cargo service Japan Freight Railway Co. reported that some of their shipments into and out of the affected areas have been either reduced or suspended. Regional supermarkets have also been affected, with outlets closed or hosting shortened service hours due to delivery delays and/or product shortages.

Japan sustained tremendous damage; losses reached an estimated ¥1.09 trillion (US$9.86 billion). Damage to agriculture, forestry, and fishery industries reached ¥629 billion (US$5.69 billion). Losses to public infrastructure, including levees, railways, and roads, amounted to ¥465 billion (US$4.21 billion).

== Rescue efforts ==
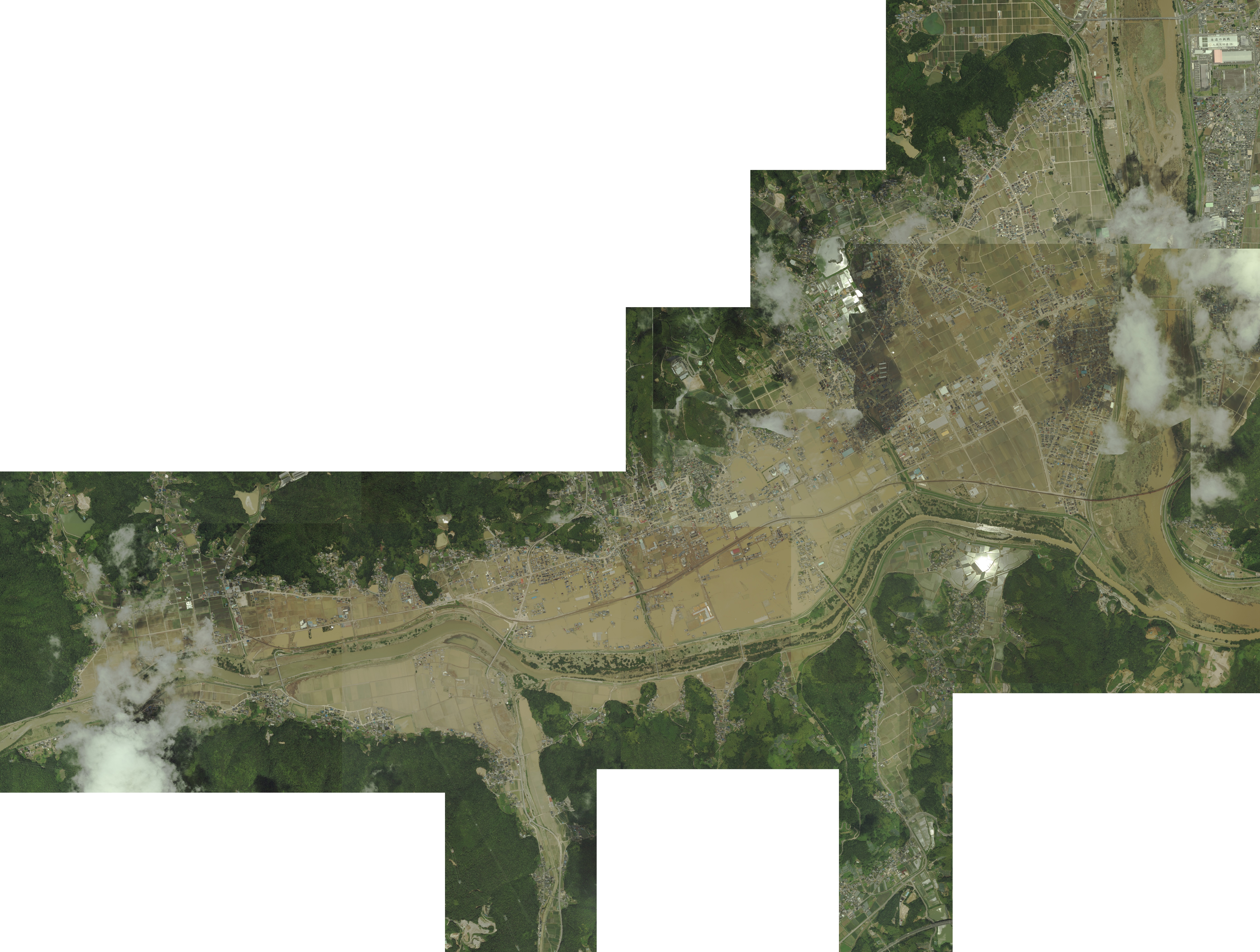
Aerial view of major flooding along the Takahashi River in Kurashiki, Okayama Prefecture on 9 July

Prime Minister Shinzō Abe released a statement ordering ministers to "make an all-out effort" to rescue victims. Abe called for an emergency disaster meeting on 8 July, the first such meeting by the government since the 2016 Kumamoto earthquakes. Chief Cabinet Secretary Yoshihide Suga, reported that the government had set up a task force which was coupled with 2 billion yen ($18 million) to hasten delivery of supplies and other support items for evacuation centers and residents in the region.

Approximately 54,000 personnel from police departments, fire departments, the Self-Defense Forces, and the Coast Guard were deployed across affected areas to rescue stranded people. Evacuations were ordered for 2.82 million and advised for a further 4.22 million people in 23 prefectures at the height of the storms. Japanese soldiers patrolled the neighborhoods during the storms and at the end, knocking on doors and inquiring whether residents were safe or in need of aid.

Helicopters and boats were utilized by rescuers to retrieve individuals trapped on rooftops and balconies. Social media have been employed to let authorities and family and friends know about the individuals' conditions. One woman from Kurashiki, Okayama tweeted "Water came to the middle of the second floor. The kids could not climb to the rooftop ... Rescue us quickly. Help us." Throughout Okayama Prefecture, 1,850 people were rescued from rooftops; 160 patients and staff at Mabi Memorial Hospital required rescue.

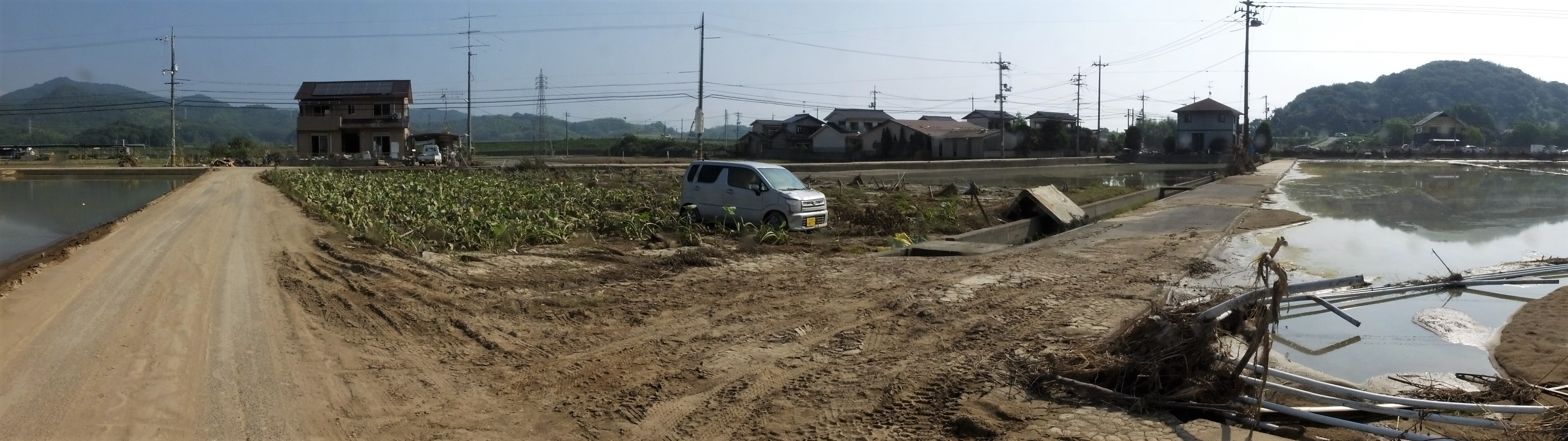
Mabi, Kurashiki, Okayama, 14 Jul 2019

== International aid ==
Taiwan : Taiwan announced that they will donate 20 million yen for disaster relief.

Thailand : Thailand sent a donation of 17 million yen to assist relief efforts. Thai Red Cross Society donated an additional 7 million yen to support those affected.

Philippines : The Philippine Government offered Filipino soldiers, engineers, and doctors for the rehabilitation efforts, along with medical supplies.

Singapore : Singapore-based non-governmental humanitarian organisation Mercy Relief announced on 8 July that they were sending a team to assist in supplying meals to people displaced by the floods, and launched a fundraiser in Singapore on 12 July.

Israel : The Israeli humanitarian aid organization IsraAID sent an emergency response team to Western Japan on 9 July, to distribute urgent relief items, assessing the medical and post-trauma psycho-social needs. The team was equipped to provide psychological first aid and mental health support for evacuees.

Malaysia : The Malaysian government donated RM500,000 to the Japanese embassy in Malaysia for the flood and recent heat wave victims.

== See also ==
- 2018 Japan heat wave
- 2014 Hiroshima landslides
- Typhoon Tokage (2004)
- Tropical Storm Etau (2009)
- Tropical Storm Talas (2011)
- Typhoon Wipha (2013)
- Tropical Storm Nanmadol (2017)
- List of deadliest floods
- 2020 Kyushu floods
