= Bangor Mountain =

Mountain in Bangor, Wales

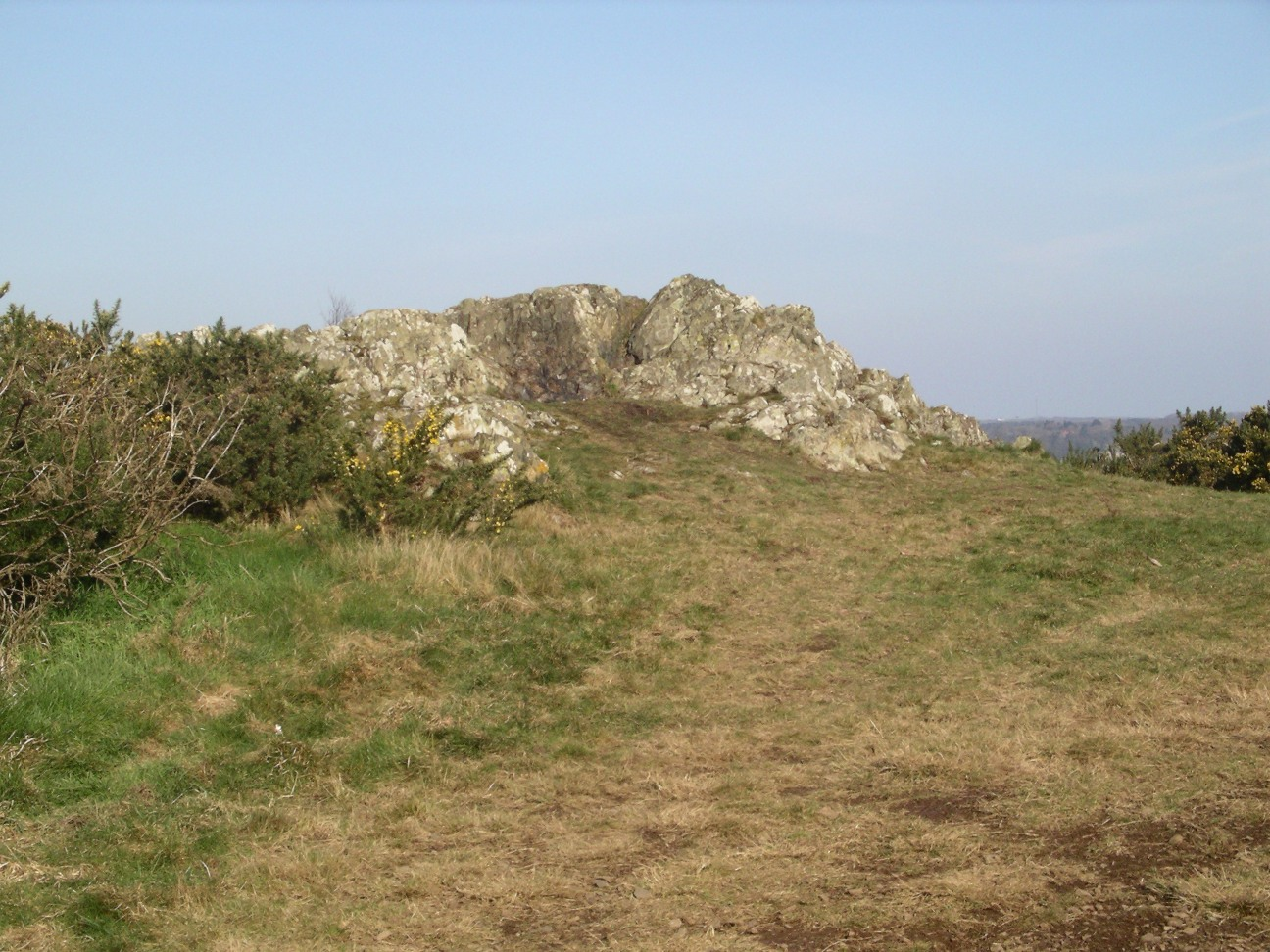
- Top of Bangor Mountain

Highest point
- Elevation: 117 m (384 ft)
- Prominence: 31 m (102 ft)
- Parent peak: Elidir Fawr
- Coordinates: 53°13′37″N 4°07′16″W

Naming
- Native name: Mynydd Bangor (Welsh)

Geography
- Location within Wales
- Location: Bangor, Gwynedd, Wales, UK
- OS grid: SH585721
- Topo map: OS Landranger 115

Bangor Mountain (Welsh: Mynydd Bangor) is a scarp face of a hill below which the city of Bangor in Gwynedd, Wales, sits.

Though not a mountain in the true sense of the word it is so-called because of the way it rears up behind Bangor and appears mountainous, especially from the Glan Adda, High Street and Hirael areas of the city.

The north-facing part of the summit was worked up with a series of paths in the late 19th century when the area was promoted as 'the pleasure grounds' in tourism literature. The Mountain is much less precipitous on its southern side. Along a substantial part of the crest of the mountain is Bangor Golf Club more properly St Deiniol's Golf Club. Because of the shape of the mountain, the golf course is linear and crosses some lanes and minor roads, including Bishop's Mill Road which was once the main route into Bangor from the south. From the south, where access is permitted, there are fine views of Puffin Island, the Great Orme, parts of the coastline, and some of the (true) mountains of Snowdonia.

There are several rocky outcrops at high points on the mountain providing panoramic views of the city centre, the Menai Strait and over to the east of Anglesey, including the town of Beaumaris. This is probably the best location from which to see the buildings of the Bangor University and the cathedral as shown in the image below (the old Students Union building, and the former Theatr Gwynedd to the centre-left of this photo, have been replaced by the new Pontio building).

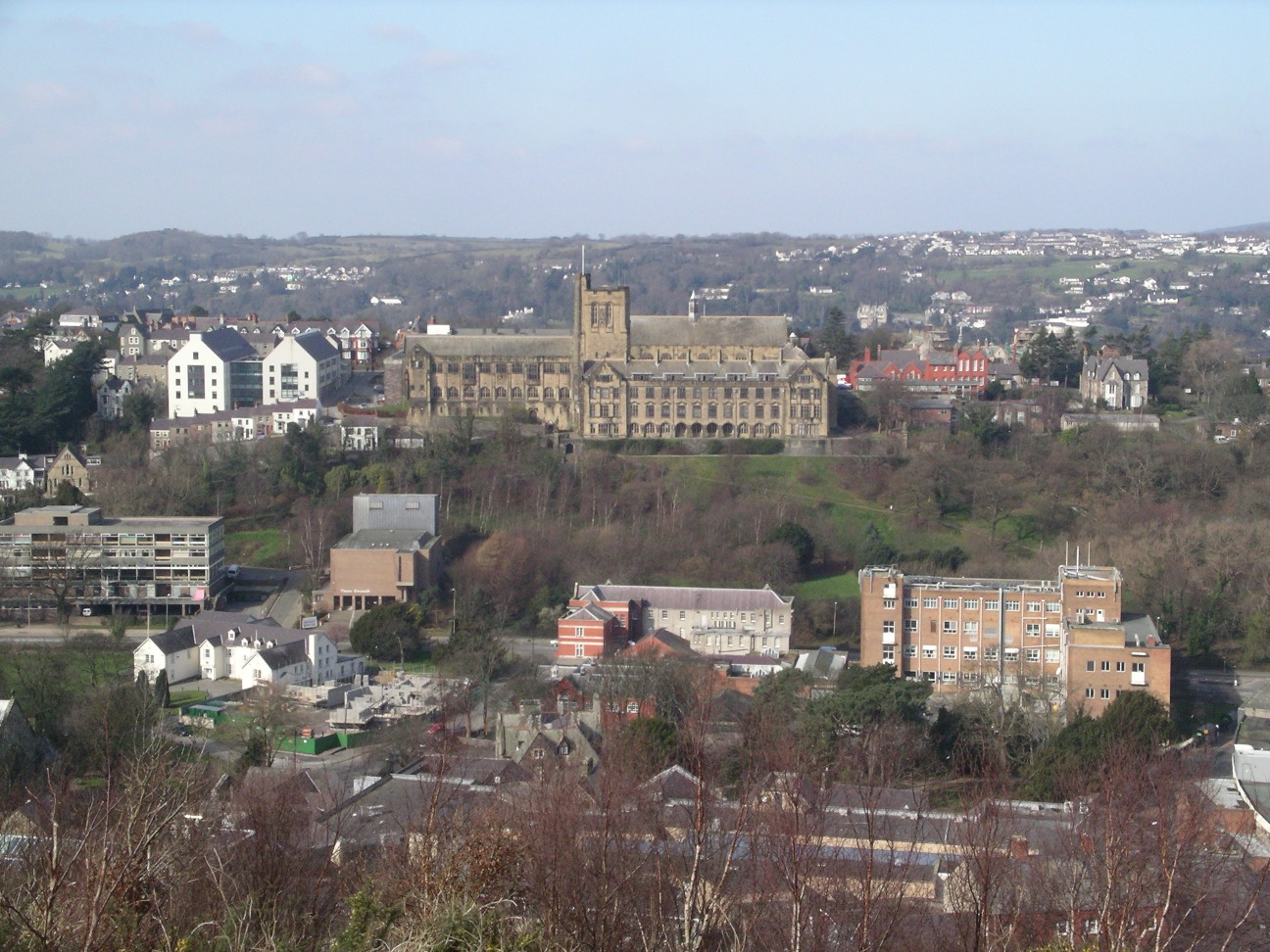
View of Bangor from Bangor Mountain

Along the side of the high street, the scarp slope is nearly vertical and clothed with trees. The slope is so severe and the mountain so close at the North end of the High Street, that one short section does not receive direct sunlight between November and February.

Bangor Mountain has a diverse ecology with a variety of mixed woods, open grassland and extensive areas of gorse although biodiversity appears to be significantly reduced within the confines of the golf course. To the north, there are some stands of Leycesteria formosa, and Japanese knotweed. The latter seems to have been present for many years without invading large areas. Around the rocky outcrops and alongside some of the many paths that weave their way around the mountain are large deposits of litter.

The extensive groves of gorse are often set alight by arsonists in dry summers producing a blaze that can be seen for many miles around. Whilst this may benefit the gorse and the ecosystem-based around gorse, the fires often spread into other areas of established woods where considerable damage is caused. These fires can also threaten gardens and outbuildings lining the base of the hill.

Bangor Mountain provides the main southern watershed for the River Adda, the principal river flowing through Bangor. However, as the river has now been culverted throughout its whole length in the built-up area of the city, it is little known to the city's population.

Part of Bangor Mountain was removed to provide car parking for a new discount supermarket. As a result, the footpath in this area now approaches very close to a precipitous edge protected by two-metre-high railings topped with sawtooth edging. The placement of the car park has occasionally led to vandals damaging parked cars utilising throwing rubble down from the footpath.
