= Admiral Rodney's Pillar =

Monument on Breidden Hill in Powys, Wales

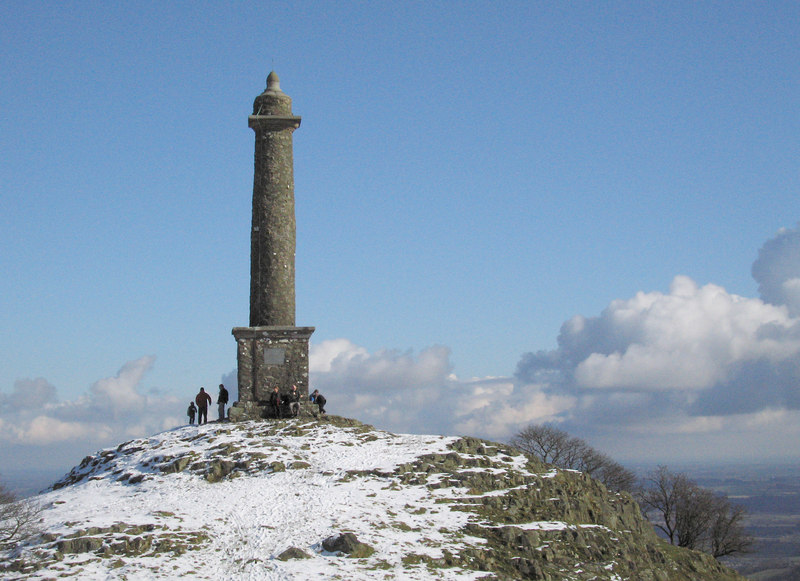
- Rodney's Pillar on Breidden Hill

- Location within Powys
- 52.7228°N 3.0451°W
- Type: Monument
- Location: Powys, Wales
- OS grid reference: SJ 2951 1441

History
- Built: 1781–82

Listed Building – Grade II*
- Official name: Admiral Rodney's Pillar
- Designated: 26 October 1953
- Reference no.: 7667
- Community: Bausley with Criggion

Admiral Rodney's Pillar (Welsh: Pilar Rodney) is a monument on Breidden Hill in Powys, Wales. It was built in 1781–82 to commemorate the naval victories of Sir George Brydges Rodney, Admiral of the White during the American War of Independence. The pillar is of local stone, 54 feet (16 m) high, and topped with a drum and finial, which replaced the original gilded ball after a lightning strike in 1847. A granite panel states that it was erected by the "Gentlemen of Montgomeryshire" to commemorate the naval successes of Admiral Rodney including the Battle of the Saints. The pillar is a conspicuous landmark around the Upper Severn Valley and is a Grade II* listed structure.

An inscription in Welsh, which had disappeared by 1890, translated as "RODNEY'S PILLAR. The highest pillar will fall, the strongest towers will decay: but the fame of Sir George Brydges Rodney shall increase continually, and his good name shall never be obliterated."

== Conservation ==
In the 21st century the monument was reported to be in need of restoration work. By late 2019, cracks had appeared in the monument and a copper lightning conductor had been stolen from its top. Restoration work was valued at £160,000.

A charity group named 'Save Rodney's Pillar' was formed with the purpose of raising funds to aid in the restoration of the monument. The charity estimated that up to £200,000 would be needed in order to restore and preserve the monument.

As of June 2022, the monument has been fenced off pending restoration work.

In September 2023, NRW announced that it had decided to dismantle and rebuild the landmark, despite concerns that some "may be unhappy" about the plans.

== See also ==
- Admiral Hood Monument
