= 2013 Great Britain and Ireland heatwave =

Weather event in the UK and Ireland

The 2013 heatwave in the United Kingdom and Ireland was a period of unusually hot weather primarily in July 2013, with isolated warm days in June and August. A prolonged high pressure system over Great Britain and Ireland caused higher than average temperatures for 19 consecutive days in July, reaching 33.5 °C (92.3 °F) at Heathrow and Northolt.

Following a brief period of cooler weather at the end of July, temperatures temporarily rose again, peaking at 34.1 °C (93.4 °F) on 1 August in the United Kingdom, the warmest the UK had seen since July 2006. Temperatures reached 31 °C (88 °F) in Ireland. At 19 days, the July heatwave was the longest continuous period of hot weather in the UK since August 1997.

== Timeline ==
On 4 July the Met Office predicted a long spell of warm weather over England and Wales to last until the middle of the month, with the south-east set to experience close to 30 °C (86 °F), and Scotland and Northern Ireland expected to avoid the warmest weather. In the following week temperatures reached 29.7 °C (85.5 °F) on the south coast and climbed to 30 °C (86 °F) in Northern Ireland, the highest temperature seen there since 2006.

Heat waves in the United Kingdom are declared when the threshold maximum day temperature and a minimum night temperature are exceeded for at least two consecutive days. The threshold temperatures differ region by region, but the average is 30 °C (86 °F) for the day and 15 °C (59 °F) for the night. On 12 July, the Met Office released heat wave alerts across much of England, with Yorkshire and the Humber placed in the level three category out of four alert levels.

On 17 July, the Met Office upgraded London and South East England to level three following the fifth consecutive day of temperatures over 30 °C (86 °F).

The heatwave ended on 23 July with heavy thunderstorms, bringing flooding and lightning strikes that caused delays on motorways and railways, power cuts and fires. Despite this, temperatures still remained above average for the time of year. On 29 July, another spell of thunderstorms hit the UK. Manchester for example was hit by three thunderstorms in eight hours. Three days later on 1 August, the temperatures rose again, recording the warmest August temperature since 2003.

In some places, 1 August was warmer than all of the days in July. London Heathrow recorded 34.1 °C (93.4 °F), which exceeded the previous record of 33.5 °C (92.3 °F) which was recorded on 22 July. By 2 August temperatures began to return to normal.

== Impact ==
On 18 July, the London School of Hygiene and Tropical Medicine reported that the first 9 days of the heat wave had caused up to an additional 760 deaths in the UK.

=== Emergency services ===
The heat wave led to rises in both the number of calls to the emergency services and admissions to A&E departments. The large numbers of people using rivers, lakes and the sea to cool off led to a large increase in the number of calls to lifeguards. The London Fire Brigade reported having to deal with double the number of grass fires in the capital compared to the previous year. Wildfires were also reported in Epping Forest in Essex, the Dorset coast, the valleys of southern Wales and Tentsmuir Forest in Scotland.

=== Ecology ===
Following declines in the summer of 2012 due to wet and windy conditions, butterfly numbers saw a surge due to the prolonged warm weather. The warmer waters around the British coasts led to an increase in the number of jellyfish sightings, particularly the moon jellyfish.

The death of thousands of fish in rivers and lakes was attributed to the elevated temperatures lowering the amount of oxygen in the water to toxic levels.
