= 2018 Northeast Asia heat wave =

Heat wave affecting Japan, Korea and China

Meteorological history
- Duration: 9 July - 26 August 2018
- Heat event
- Max temp: 41.1 °C (106.0 °F), recorded at Kumagaya, Saitama, Japan on 23 July

Overall effects
- Casualties: ≥70,000 (Japan), 3,440 (S. Korea) hospitalized
- Fatalities: 138 (Japan), 42 (S. Korea)
- Areas affected: Japan, North Korea, South Korea, China

Throughout much of July 2018, a record-breaking heat wave affected large areas of Northeast Asia including Japan, North Korea, South Korea and China. Many areas in Japan experienced temperatures in excess of 35 °C (95 °F), and Kumagaya recorded a maximum temperature of 40.8 °C (105.4 °F) on 23 July – the highest ever observed in the country.

== Synopsis ==
Following flooding and mudslides that lasted from late June through mid-July 2018, an extensive heat wave spread across the Japanese mainland. In the prefectures that had been hit the worst by floods and landslides, Hiroshima, Okayama, and Ehime, 145 people were hospitalized with heat stroke symptoms as temperatures there rose above 35 °C (95.0 °F). On 15 July, 200 out of 927 stations in the nationwide observation network recorded maximum temperatures exceeding 35 °C (95.0 °F). On 23 July, a high temperature of 40.8 °C (105.4 °F) was observed in Kumagaya, 65 km (40 mi) northwest of Tokyo. This constitutes an all-time high for all of Japan. Many cities recorded temperatures near 40 °C (104 °F) on this day. In Kyoto, temperatures stood above 38 °C (100 °F) for seven days in a row for the first time since records began to be kept in the 19th century.

By 24 July, the Japan Meteorological Agency (JMA) called the event a natural disaster and indicated many areas were observing "unprecedented levels of heat". A study depicted the three‐phase lifecycle of the East Asian summer monsoon and the corresponding timing of the 2018 consecutive extreme events (indicated in the bottom). The sequential yet contrasting extreme events in Japan therefore reflect an amplified monsoon lifecycle projected in a warmer climate.(ASL study 2019)

== Effects ==
In South Korea, some 42 people died, while North Korea witnessed crop destruction. In Shenyang, China, air conditioner sales in one company spiked 35-fold over the previous years.

In Japan, at least 138 people have died from heat-related causes and at 71,266 required hospitalization for heat stroke through early August. Fatalities have occurred in 28 of the nation's 47 prefectures. Between 15 and 22 July, 65 people died from the heat, including 11 on 21 July and 13 on 23 July. The number of casualties from the heat was the greatest seen in a single-week period since the government started keeping detailed records in 2008. On 17 July, the Tokyo Fire Department dispatched ambulances 2,900 times—the greatest number in a single day since the department began in 1936. This was surpassed only four days later, 21 July, when ambulances were dispatched 3,125 times.

The Japanese Education Ministry issued a warning to schools to take precautions against heat stroke, following the death of one six-year-old boy who was attending an outdoor event. Fewer than half of schools in the country have air conditioning, and government officials discussed extending school holidays for safety. Furthermore, the government considered covering the cost of installing air conditioners in schools. Kyushu Electric Power offered 10 percent discounts to customers aged 75 years and older for their August and September bills to facilitate the use of air conditioners.

== See also ==
- List of heat waves
- List of disasters in Japan by death toll
- Natural disasters in Japan
- 2018 Japan floods
