= European heatwave =

European heat wave may refer to:

- 1757 heatwave
- 1947 European heat wave
- 1976 European heatwave
- 2003 European heatwave
- 2006 European heatwave
- 2007 European heatwave
- 2018 European heatwave
- 2019 European heatwaves
- 2022 European heatwaves
- 2023 European heatwaves
- 2024 European heatwaves
- 2025 European heatwaves
- 2026 European heatwaves

== See also ==
- 1976 British Isles heatwave
- 2010 Northern Hemisphere heat waves
- 2013 Great Britain and Ireland heatwave
- 2018 British Isles heatwave
- 2021 British Isles heatwaves
- Heat wave (disambiguation)
- List of heat waves
- European drought (disambiguation)
