= Heat wave (disambiguation) =

A heat wave is a prolonged period of unusually hot weather.

Heat Wave or heatwave may refer to:

== Fictional characters ==
- Heat Wave (character), a supervillain from DC Comics
- Heatwave (Transformers), a fictional character in the Transformers universe

== Films ==
- Heat Wave (1935 film), a British comedy
- The House Across the Lake, a 1954 film released as Heat Wave in the US
- Heatwave!, a 1974 film with Ben Murphy and Bonnie Bedelia
- Heatwave (film), a 1982 Australian film directed by Phillip Noyce
- Heatwave (2022 film), directed by Ernie Barbarash
- Heat Wave (1990 film), an American television film
- Heat Wave (2009 American film), a television film featuring Jamie Luner
- Heat Wave (2009 Canadian film), featuring Marie-Thérèse Fortin
- Heat Wave (2011 film), a French drama film
- Heat Wave (2015 film), a French film

== Music ==
=== Groups ===
- Heatwave (band), an international funk/disco music band
- Heatwave (English band), a London-based band active between 1969 and 1972
- Heat Wave Drum and Bugle Corps, Tampa, Florida
- The Heatwave, a dancehall sound system and production crew from London

=== Albums ===
- Heat Wave (Ahmad Jamal album), 1966
- Heat Wave (Cal Tjader and Carmen McRae album), 1982
- Heat Wave (Martha and the Vandellas album), 1963
- Heat Wave (The Jazz Crusaders album), 1963
- Heatwave (Univers Zero album), 1986
- Heatwave, a 2021 EP by ACT
- Heatwave (Bronze Avery album), 2024

=== Songs ===
- "Heat Wave" (Alphabeat song), 2010
- "Heat Wave" (Irving Berlin song), 1933
- "Heat Wave" (Martha and the Vandellas song), a 1963 Holland–Dozier–Holland song recorded by Martha and the Vandellas, and later recorded by Linda Ronstadt and The Who
- "Heatwave" (Robin Schulz song), 2015, featuring Akon
- "Heatwave" (Wiley song), 2012
- "Heat Waves", a song by Glass Animals from the album Dreamland
- "Heat Wave", a song by Snail Mail from the album Lush
- "Heatwave", a song by XTC, the B-side of the single "This Is Pop?"
- "Heatwave", a song by the Blue Nile from the album A Walk Across the Rooftops
- "Heatwave", a song by Bronski Beat from the album The Age of Consent (album)
- "Heatwave", a song by Bronze Avery from the album Heatwave (Bronze Avery album)

== Science ==
- Thermal radiation, electromagnetic waves that carry heat
  - Black-body radiation, an idealized model of thermal radiation
  - Infrared, the wavelengths of thermal radiation at room temperature

== Other arts, entertainment, and media ==
- Heat Wave (novel), a novel attributed to fictional character Richard Castle of the TV series Castle
- Heatwave (festival), a music festival held in 1980 at Mosport, Canada
- Heatwave (magazine), an anarchist magazine in the 1960s by Charles Radcliffe
- "Heat Wave" (Baywatch), a 1989 television episode
- Heat Waves (fan fiction), a fan fiction published between 2020 and 2021
- ECW Heat Wave, a pay-per-view event by the now-defunct Extreme Championship Wrestling

== See also ==
- Heat burst
- Heat haze, a type of mirage caused by refraction of light in hot air
- Wave of Heat, a 2010 album by Izzy Stradlin
