= 1757 heatwave =

In Europe

A very significant heat wave occurred in Europe in July 1757. The heat wave may have been the hottest summer in Continental Europe between the summers of 1540 and 2003.

Over Central England, July 1757 was the hottest month on record since 1659, at the time, and would not be beaten until July 1783. It still is the twelfth-warmest on record in that series.

Temperature readings taken at the Paris Observatory by René-Antoine Ferchault de Réaumur and Joseph-Nicolas Delisle indicate an average temperature in Paris of 22°C for the month of July 1757, with a peak of 37.7°C on July 14, 1757.

== Accounts ==
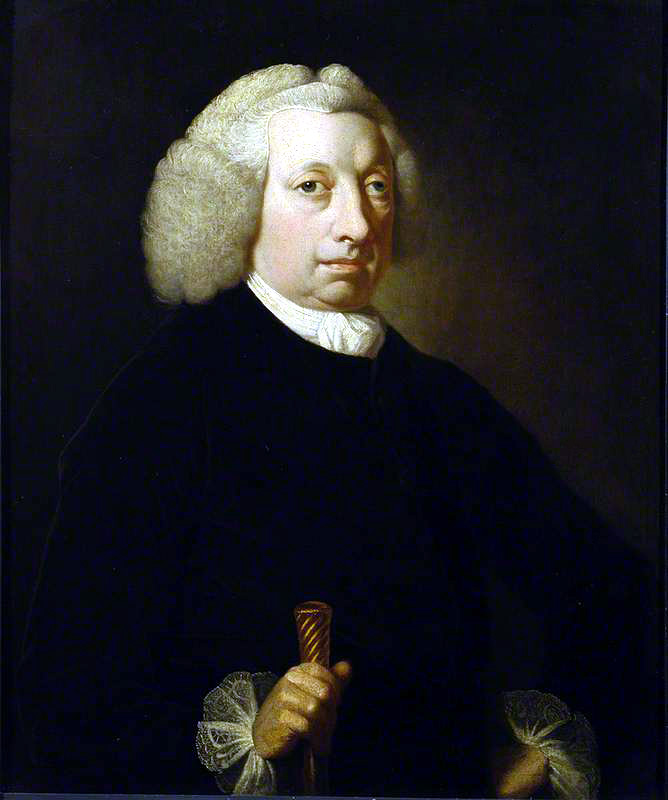
Physician John Huxham reported that the heat caused many maladies.

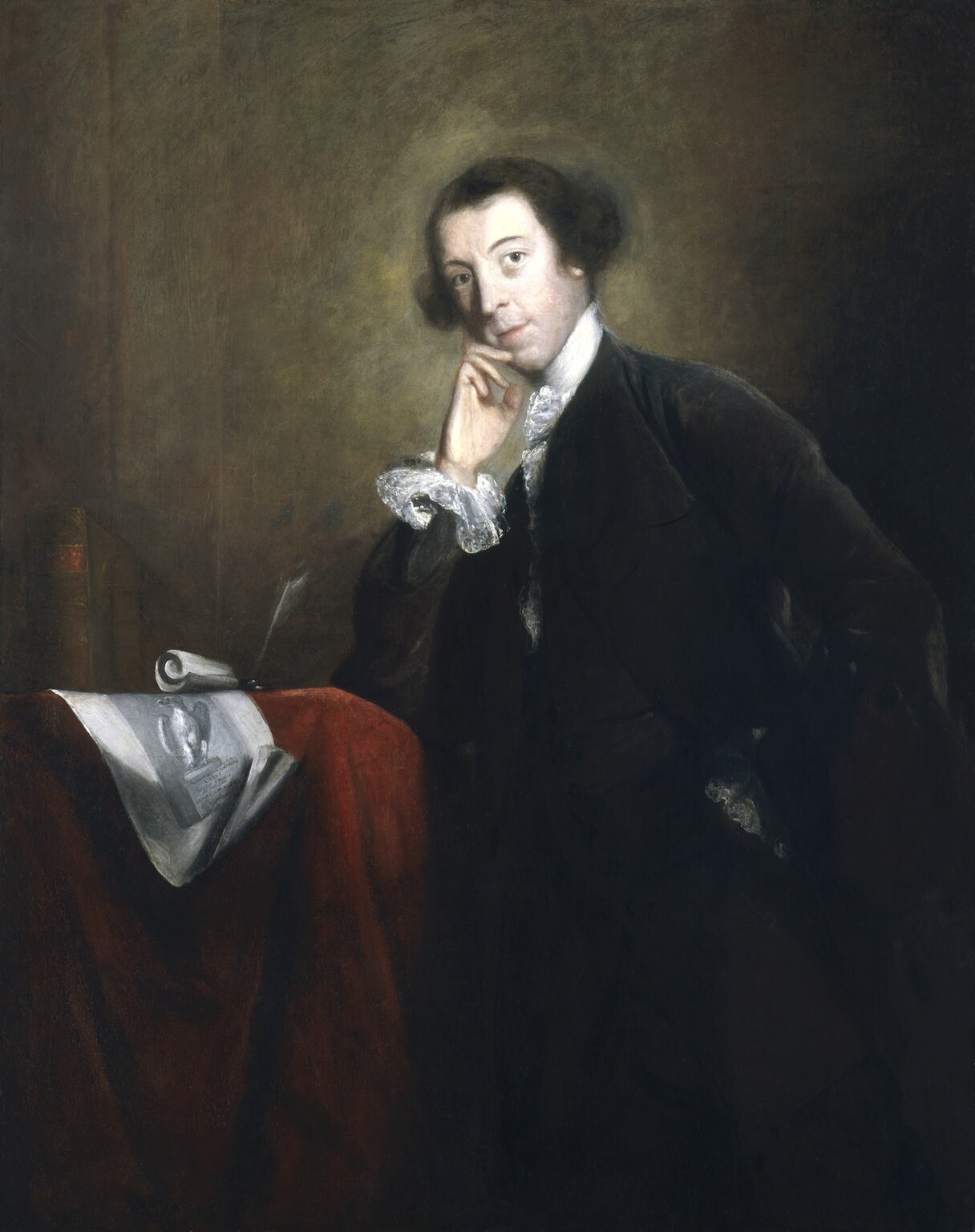
Horace Walpole wrote in July 1757, "for how many years we shall have to talk of the summer of fifty-seven!"

There were contemporaneous accounts of the heat wave noting its effects. Physician John Huxham wrote An Account of the Extraordinary Heat of the Weather in July 1757, and the Effects of It, which appeared in the Philosophical Transactions of the Royal Society in 1758. Huxham reports on the effects in England, writing that it caused "haemorrhages from several parts of the body", including the nose, and the uterus in women. Among other maladies, Huxham described "sudden and violent pains of the head, and vertigo, profuse sweats, great debility and oppression of the spirits, affected many. There were putrid fevers in great abundance." Symptoms consistent with dehydration described by Huxham included that "the urine was commonly high colored, and in small quantity."

Horace Walpole wrote a letter on 12 July 1757 noting "the heat of this magnificent weather, with the glass up to three-quarters of sultry." He also commented that on walking his garden, "I thought I should have died of it" and exclaimed: "For how many years we shall have to talk of the summer of fifty-seven!" Four days later he remarked in another letter that "the weather has been so hot, and we are so unused to it, that nobody knew how to behave themselves. Even Mr. Bentley has done shivering."

Other reports include a letter from Brussels which appeared in the London Chronicle, claiming that the temperature on 14 July reached "a Degree of Heat which hath not been felt in this Country for many years," and a report from Dublin calling it the warmest summer in Ireland in the past 35 years.

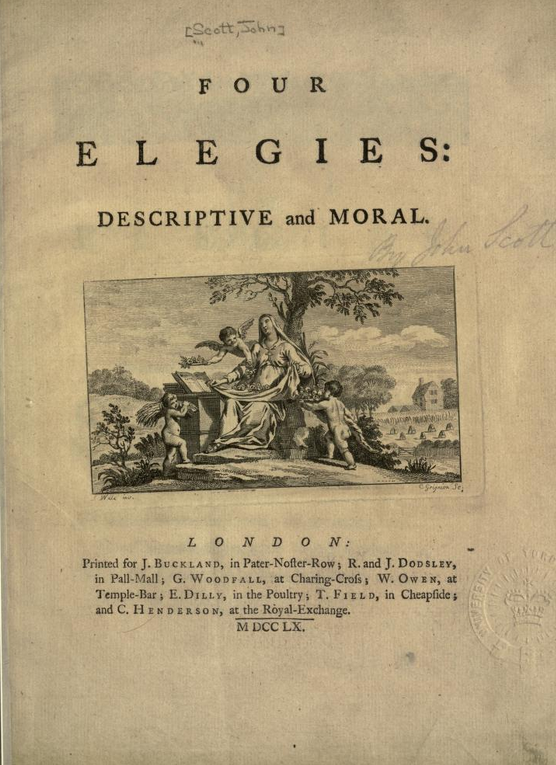
The cover page of John Scott of Amwell's Four Elegies: Descriptive and Moral published in 1760, Elegy II reflects on the 1757 heat wave.

Quaker poet John Scott of Amwell wrote of the heat wave in his 1760 Four Elegies: Descriptive and Moral,, with Elegy II "written in the hot weather, July, 1757." It included stanzas such as "Lost is the lively Aspect of the Ground; Low are the Springs, the reedy Ditches dry; No verdant Spot in all the Vale is found; Save what yon Stream's unfailing Stores supply."

Whether or not Walpole was correct that the 1757 heat wave would be long discussed, it has not been the subject of much subsequent discussion or writing, aside from occasional reprints of accounts such as Huxham's. When the 2003 European heat occurred, the earlier event was noted in the press as holding the prior record.
