= Climate of Belfast =

Belfast, United Kingdom

Climate chart (precipitation, max. and min. temperature)
J	F	M	A	M	J	J	A	S	O	N	D
89 8 2	70 9 2	71 10 3	60 13 5	60 16 7	69 18 10	74 20 12	85 19 11	70 17 10	96 14 7	102 11 4	93 8 2
- █ Average max. and min. temperatures in °C
- █ Precipitation totals in mm
- Source: Met Office
Imperial conversion
J	F	M	A	M	J	J	A	S	O	N	D
3.5 47 36	2.8 48 36	2.8 51 38	2.4 55 40	2.3 60 45	2.7 65 49	2.9 68 53	3.3 67 53	2.7 63 49	3.8 57 44	4 51 40	3.7 47 36
- █ Average max. and min. temperatures in °F
- █ Precipitation totals in inches

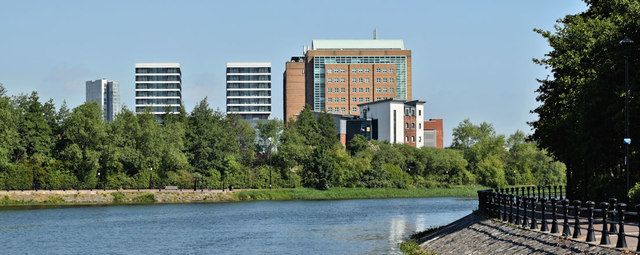
River Lagan in Belfast during the Summer

The climate of Belfast features a temperate maritime climate (Köppen: Cfb) with relatively mild summers, cool winters and abundant rainfall throughout the year. There are several weather stations in Belfast, with the main stations being at Stormont Castle which since 1959 has been recording temperature and rainfall records. Another weather station closer to the city centre at Newforge has been recording observations since 1982. Further afield, another station is located at Belfast International Airport, which has been recording observations since 1930.

Within the Belfast City District, the highest temperature recorded is 31.2 °C (88.2 °F) at Ravenhill Road on 21 July 2021, and the lowest temperature recorded is −13.5 °C (7.7 °F) at Newforge on 22 December 2010. Although at Belfast International Airport located 12 miles west of the city, a temperature of 30.8 °C (87.4 °F) was recorded on 18 July 2022 whilst a temperature of −14.9 °C (5.2 °F) was recorded on 22 December 2010.

== Classifications ==
Belfast Climate according to major climate systems
Climatic scheme	Initials	Description
Köppen system	Cfb	Oceanic climate (Note: Also called marine west coast.)
Trewartha system	Do	Temperate oceanic climate
Alisov system	—N/a	Temperate climate (Note: Mid-latitude temperate maritime climate)
Strahler system	—N/a	Marine west-coast
Thornthwaite system	C2 B'1	Moist subhumid
Neef system	—N/a	West side/maritime climate

== Temperature ==
The average yearly high temperature in Belfast is 13.7 °C (56.7 °F) and the average yearly low is 6.3 °C (43.3 °F). The average daily mean is 9.9 °C (49.8 °F).

=== Averages ===
Climate data for Belfast (Newforge), (Note: Weather station is located 2.6 miles (4.2 km) from the Belfast city centre.) 40 m (131 ft) amsl, 1991–2020 normals
Month	Jan	Feb	Mar	Apr	May	Jun	Jul	Aug	Sep	Oct	Nov	Dec	Year
Mean daily maximum °C (°F)	8.2 (46.8)	8.8 (47.8)	10.5 (50.9)	12.8 (55.0)	15.7 (60.3)	17.2 (63.0)	19.7 (67.5)	19.4 (66.9)	17.3 (63.1)	13.8 (56.8)	10.7 (51.3)	8.4 (47.1)	13.7 (56.7)
Daily mean °C (°F)	5.2 (41.4)	5.5 (41.9)	6.8 (44.2)	8.8 (47.8)	11.4 (52.5)	14.0 (57.2)	15.6 (60.1)	15.4 (59.7)	13.5 (56.3)	10.4 (50.7)	7.4 (45.3)	5.4 (41.7)	9.9 (49.8)
Mean daily minimum °C (°F)	2.2 (36.0)	2.1 (35.8)	3.1 (37.6)	4.7 (40.5)	7.0 (44.6)	9.7 (49.5)	11.6 (52.9)	11.5 (52.7)	9.6 (49.3)	6.9 (44.4)	4.2 (39.6)	2.3 (36.1)	6.3 (43.3)
Source: Met Office

Climate data for Belfast (Newforge), (Note: Weather station is located 2.6 miles (4.2 km) from the Belfast city centre.) 40 m (131 ft) amsl, 1961–1990 normals
Month	Jan	Feb	Mar	Apr	May	Jun	Jul	Aug	Sep	Oct	Nov	Dec	Year
Mean daily maximum °C (°F)	7.3 (45.1)	7.4 (45.3)	9.5 (49.1)	11.7 (53.1)	14.6 (58.3)	17.6 (63.7)	19.0 (66.2)	18.7 (65.7)	16.6 (61.9)	13.6 (56.5)	9.6 (49.3)	8.1 (46.6)	12.8 (55.0)
Daily mean °C (°F)	4.5 (40.1)	4.6 (40.3)	6.1 (43.0)	8.0 (46.4)	10.6 (51.1)	13.5 (56.3)	15.1 (59.2)	14.8 (58.6)	12.9 (55.2)	10.4 (50.7)	6.6 (43.9)	5.3 (41.5)	9.4 (48.9)
Mean daily minimum °C (°F)	1.8 (35.2)	1.8 (35.2)	2.8 (37.0)	4.2 (39.6)	6.7 (44.1)	9.4 (48.9)	11.1 (52.0)	10.9 (51.6)	9.2 (48.6)	7.3 (45.1)	3.6 (38.5)	2.5 (36.5)	6.3 (43.3)
Source: Met Office

=== Extremes ===
Due to Belfast having an oceanic climate, extremes of temperatures are rare. Furthermore, as the city is located on the coast of the Irish Sea, wind chill is enhanced as a result of stronger winds as well as heat indexes being higher than areas further inland as a result of the higher humidity found close to bodies of water.

Climate data for Belfast, 1959–present extremes (Note: Extremes are recorded from all stations within the Belfast City District, including Black and Divis Mountains.)
Month	Jan	Feb	Mar	Apr	May	Jun	Jul	Aug	Sep	Oct	Nov	Dec	Year
Record high °C (°F)	15.0 (59.0)	16.4 (61.5)	20.2 (68.4)	23.1 (73.6)	26.2 (79.2)	30.0 (86.0)	31.2 (88.2)	29.3 (84.7)	25.8 (78.4)	21.5 (70.7)	17.8 (64.0)	15.6 (60.1)	31.2 (88.2)
Record low °C (°F)	−12.6 (9.3)	−12.2 (10.0)	−9.6 (14.7)	−6.0 (21.2)	−5.0 (23.0)	−0.1 (31.8)	1.7 (35.1)	0.8 (33.4)	−1.1 (30.0)	−3.2 (26.2)	−8.0 (17.6)	−13.5 (7.7)	−13.5 (7.7)
Source 1: Met Office
Source 2: Starlings Roost Weather

==== Highest daily temperatures ====
Period	Record temperature	Station	Date
January	15.0 °C (59.0 °F)	Newforge	26 January 2003
February	16.4 °C (61.5 °F)	Newforge; Upper Falls	14 February 1998; 13 February 1998
March	20.2 °C (68.4 °F)	Ravenhill Road	28 March 2012
April	23.1 °C (73.6 °F)	Milltown	25 April 1975
May	26.2 °C (79.2 °F)	Ravenhill Road	22 May 2010
June	30.0 °C (86.0 °F)	Ravenhill Road	29 June 1995
July	31.2 °C (88.2 °F)	Ravenhill Road	21 July 2021
August	29.3 °C (84.7 °F)	Ravenhill Road	21 August 1995
September	25.8 °C (78.4 °F)	Stormont Castle	8 September 2023
October	21.5 °C (70.7 °F)	Oldpark Filters	1 October 1985
November	17.8 °C (64.0 °F)	Malone	1 November 1971
December	15.6 °C (60.1 °F)	Rosetta	20 December 1971

==== Lowest daily temperatures ====
Period	Record temperature	Station	Date
January	−12.6 °C (9.3 °F)	Shaws Bridge; Rosebank	11 January 1982; 12 January 1982
February	−12.2 °C (10.0 °F)	Malone	16 February 1969
March	−9.6 °C (14.7 °F)	Black Mountain	2 March 1965
April	−6.0 °C (21.2 °F)	Divis Mountain	10 April 1978
May	−5.0 °C (23.0 °F)	Divis Mountain	03 May 1967
June	−0.1 °C (31.8 °F)	Divis Mountain; Shaws Bridge	2 June 1975; 2 June 1984
July	1.7 °C (35.1 °F)	Divis Mountain	22 July 1970
August	0.8 °C (33.4 °F)	Shaws Bridge	28 August 1982
September	−1.1 °C (30.0 °F)	Divis Mountain	22 September 1979
October	−3.2 °C (26.2 °F)	Malone	31 October 1988
November	−8.0 °C (17.6 °F)	Malone	27 November 1989
December	−13.5 °C (7.7 °F)	Newforge	20 December 1971

==== Daily record warm minima ====
Period	Record temperature	Station	Date
January	12.5 °C (54.5 °F)	Upper Falls	10 January 1998
February	12.5 °C (54.5 °F)	Ravenhill Road; Upper Falls	12 February 1998; 13 February 1998
March	12.8 °C (55.0 °F)	Ravenhill Road	18 March 2005
April	13.9 °C (57.0 °F)	Newforge; Ravenhill Road	28 April 1994; 6 April 2011
May	15.5 °C (59.9 °F)	Ravenhill Road	31 May 2018
June	17.7 °C (63.9 °F)	Ravenhill Road	29 June 2019
July	19.0 °C (66.2 °F)	Stormont Castle	20 July 1995
August	19.1 °C (66.4 °F)	Ravenhill Road	14 August 2001
September	18.3 °C (64.9 °F)	Ravenhill Road	5 September 1999
October	15.6 °C (60.1 °F)	Ravenhill Road	8 October 2021
November	14.3 °C (57.7 °F)	Stormont Castle	11 November 2022
December	13.3 °C (55.9 °F)	Ravenhill Road	11 December 1994

==== Daily record cold maxima ====
Period	Record temperature	Station	Date
January	−2.8 °C (27.0 °F)	Divis Mountain; Ravenhill Road	1 January 1979; 8 January 2010
February	−2.7 °C (27.1 °F)	Black Mountain	7 February 1969
March	−1.2 °C (29.8 °F)	Black Mountain	1 March 1965
April	0.0 °C (32.0 °F)	Divis Mountain	15 April 1966; 16 April 1966
May	4.4 °C (39.9 °F)	Black Mountain	4 May 1968
June	7.7 °C (45.9 °F)	Divis Mountain	11 June 1977; 23 June 1978
July	8.8 °C (47.8 °F)	Divis Mountain	4 July 1978
August	10.1 °C (50.2 °F)	Black Mountain	15 August 1972
September	6.8 °C (44.2 °F)	Divis Mountain	27 September 1975
October	4.5 °C (40.1 °F)	Malone	17 October 1973
November	−0.6 °C (30.9 °F)	Black Mountain	25 November 1965
December	−8.3 °C (17.1 °F)	Ravenhill Road	21 December 2010

==== Highest Averages ====
Period	Record mean	Year
Year	10.8 °C (51.4 °F)	2025
Spring (March–May)	10.6 °C (51.1 °F)	2025
Summer (June–August)	16.2 °C (61.2 °F)	1995
Autumn (September–November)	11.6 °C (52.9 °F)	2022
Winter (December–February)	6.5 °C (43.7 °F)	1988–89
January	6.5 °C (43.7 °F)	2005
February	7.9 °C (46.2 °F)	1998
March	9.0 °C (48.2 °F)	2012
April	11.3 °C (52.3 °F)	2011
May	13.7 °C (56.7 °F)	2024
June	16.7 °C (62.1 °F)	2023
July	17.7 °C (63.9 °F)	2013
August	17.8 °C (64.0 °F)	1995
September	14.9 °C (58.8 °F)	2021
October	12.4 °C (54.3 °F)	1969
November	9.6 °C (49.3 °F)	1994
December	7.5 °C (45.5 °F)	1988

==== Lowest Averages ====
Period	Record mean	Year
Year	7.9 °C (46.2 °F)	1979
Spring (March–May)	6.0 °C (42.8 °F)	1979
Summer (June–August)	13.1 °C (55.6 °F)	1972
Autumn (September–November)	8.4 °C (47.1 °F)	1974
Winter (December–February)	2.2 °C (36.0 °F)	1962–63
January	0.7 °C (33.3 °F)	1979
February	1.2 °C (34.2 °F)	1963
March	3.1 °C (37.6 °F)	2013
April	5.6 °C (42.1 °F)	1986
May	7.7 °C (45.9 °F)	1979
June	11.1 °C (52.0 °F)	1972
July	12.9 °C (55.2 °F)	1965
August	12.1 °C (53.8 °F)	1986
September	10.8 °C (51.4 °F)	1974
October	7.1 °C (44.8 °F)	1981
November	4.0 °C (39.2 °F)	1969
December	2.1 °C (35.8 °F)	1976

== Precipitation ==
Precipitation is fairly regular throughout the year in Belfast, with no wet or dry season as a result of its oceanic climate. All extreme rainfall records were recorded at Stormont Castle since 1961.

=== Averages ===
Climate data for Belfast (Newforge), (Note: Weather station is located 2.6 miles (4.2 km) from the Belfast city centre.) 40 m (131 ft) amsl, precipitation 1991–2020 normals
Month	Jan	Feb	Mar	Apr	May	Jun	Jul	Aug	Sep	Oct	Nov	Dec	Year
Average precipitation mm (inches)	88.5 (3.48)	70.3 (2.77)	71.4 (2.81)	60.4 (2.38)	59.6 (2.35)	69.0 (2.72)	73.6 (2.90)	85.0 (3.35)	69.6 (2.74)	95.8 (3.77)	102.3 (4.03)	93.3 (3.67)	938.7 (36.96)
Average precipitation days (≥ 1.0 mm)	14.4	12.7	12.6	11.3	11.5	11.4	13.0	13.5	11.6	13.8	15.5	14.8	156.2
Source: Met Office

Climate data for Belfast (Stormont Castle), (Note: Weather station is located 3.9 miles (6.3 km) from the Belfast city centre.) elevation: 56 m (184 ft), precipitation 1991–2020 normals
Month	Jan	Feb	Mar	Apr	May	Jun	Jul	Aug	Sep	Oct	Nov	Dec	Year
Average precipitation mm (inches)	92.5 (3.64)	71.6 (2.82)	73.9 (2.91)	64.4 (2.54)	67.7 (2.67)	74.4 (2.93)	77.0 (3.03)	86.0 (3.39)	74.6 (2.94)	97.2 (3.83)	102.5 (4.04)	95.2 (3.75)	976.9 (38.46)
Average precipitation days (≥ 1.0 mm)	15.3	13.1	13.3	11.6	12.3	11.5	12.4	13.6	11.5	13.3	15.4	14.5	157.8
Source: ECA&D

=== Extremes ===
==== Lowest ====
Period	Record rainfall	Year
Year	711.6 millimetres (28.02 in)	1975
Spring (March–May)	82.0 millimetres (3.23 in)	2020
Summer (June–August)	70.3 millimetres (2.77 in)	1983
Autumn (September–November)	121.2 millimetres (4.77 in)	2004
Winter (December–February)	80.2 millimetres (3.16 in)	1963–64
January	21.3 millimetres (0.84 in)	2006
February	3.9 millimetres (0.15 in)	1986
March	16.7 millimetres (0.66 in)	1961
April	6.0 millimetres (0.24 in)	1980
May	6.2 millimetres (0.24 in)	1991
June	22.1 millimetres (0.87 in)	1992
July	10.5 millimetres (0.41 in)	1982
August	6.0 millimetres (0.24 in)	1995
September	2.4 millimetres (0.094 in)	2014
October	24.9 millimetres (0.98 in)	1978
November	7.2 millimetres (0.28 in)	2004
December	13.9 millimetres (0.55 in)	1971

==== Highest ====
Period	Record rainfall	Year
Year	1,286.1 millimetres (50.63 in)	2002
Spring (March–May)	345.8 millimetres (13.61 in)	1993
Summer (June–August)	464.2 millimetres (18.28 in)	2012
Autumn (September–November)	463.7 millimetres (18.26 in)	2002
Winter (December–February)	464.2 millimetres (18.28 in)	2015–16
January	187.6 millimetres (7.39 in)	2008
February	177.5 millimetres (6.99 in)	1966
March	146.8 millimetres (5.78 in)	2024
April	138.7 millimetres (5.46 in)	1991
May	197.4 millimetres (7.77 in)	1993
June	222.4 millimetres (8.76 in)	2012
July	130.4 millimetres (5.13 in)	2023
August	191.6 millimetres (7.54 in)	2008
September	175.3 millimetres (6.90 in)	1999
October	212.0 millimetres (8.35 in)	2023
November	246.8 millimetres (9.72 in)	2002
December	273.1 millimetres (10.75 in)	1978

== Other Phenomena ==
=== Sunshine, UV and daylight ===
Like most of the British Isles, Belfast sees frequent overcast and cloudy skies due to the oceanic controlled climate and high latitude.

Climate data for Belfast (Newforge), (Note: Weather station is located 2.6 miles (4.2 km) from the Belfast city centre.) 40 m (131 ft) amsl, sun 1991–2020 normals
Month	Jan	Feb	Mar	Apr	May	Jun	Jul	Aug	Sep	Oct	Nov	Dec	Year
Mean monthly sunshine hours	40.1	65.2	97.7	157.1	185.1	151.1	146.3	141.9	112.0	92.4	52.9	35.3	1,277
Mean daily daylight hours	8.0	9.7	11.9	14.1	16.1	17.2	16.6	14.9	12.7	10.5	8.5	7.4	12.3
Average ultraviolet index	2	2	2	3	4	4	4	4	3	3	2	2	3
Source 1: Met Office
Source 2: WeatherAtlas

=== Wind ===
The mean yearly wind speed at 10m in Belfast is 9.8 mph (8.5 kn). Records were recorded at Belfast International Airport.

Period	Mean wind speed at 10m
Annual	9.8 mph (8.5 kn)
January	11.3 mph (9.8 kn)
February	11.3 mph (9.8 kn)
March	10.8 mph (9.4 kn)
April	10.0 mph (8.7 kn)
May	9.4 mph (8.2 kn)
June	8.7 mph (7.6 kn)
July	8.3 mph (7.2 kn)
August	8.3 mph (7.2 kn)
September	8.9 mph (7.7 kn)
October	9.9 mph (8.6 kn)
November	10.2 mph (8.9 kn)
December	10.5 mph (9.1 kn)

== Station Data ==
Climate data for Belfast (Newforge), (Note: Weather station is located 2.6 miles (4.2 km) from the Belfast city centre.) 40 m (131 ft) amsl, 1991–2020 normals, extremes 1982–present
Month	Jan	Feb	Mar	Apr	May	Jun	Jul	Aug	Sep	Oct	Nov	Dec	Year
Record high °C (°F)	15.0 (59.0)	16.4 (61.5)	19.7 (67.5)	22.1 (71.8)	25.4 (77.7)	28.6 (83.5)	30.2 (86.4)	28.1 (82.6)	23.7 (74.7)	20.5 (68.9)	17.1 (62.8)	15.2 (59.4)	30.2 (86.4)
Mean daily maximum °C (°F)	8.2 (46.8)	8.8 (47.8)	10.5 (50.9)	12.8 (55.0)	15.7 (60.3)	17.2 (63.0)	19.7 (67.5)	19.4 (66.9)	17.3 (63.1)	13.8 (56.8)	10.7 (51.3)	8.4 (47.1)	13.7 (56.7)
Daily mean °C (°F)	5.2 (41.4)	5.5 (41.9)	6.8 (44.2)	8.8 (47.8)	11.4 (52.5)	14.0 (57.2)	15.6 (60.1)	15.4 (59.7)	13.5 (56.3)	10.4 (50.7)	7.4 (45.3)	5.4 (41.7)	9.9 (49.8)
Mean daily minimum °C (°F)	2.2 (36.0)	2.1 (35.8)	3.1 (37.6)	4.7 (40.5)	7.0 (44.6)	9.7 (49.5)	11.6 (52.9)	11.5 (52.7)	9.6 (49.3)	6.9 (44.4)	4.2 (39.6)	2.3 (36.1)	6.3 (43.3)
Record low °C (°F)	−10.1 (13.8)	−7.1 (19.2)	−6.5 (20.3)	−3.8 (25.2)	−2.6 (27.3)	1.3 (34.3)	4.2 (39.6)	2.5 (36.5)	0.8 (33.4)	−3.0 (26.6)	−7.6 (18.3)	−13.5 (7.7)	−13.5 (7.7)
Average precipitation mm (inches)	88.5 (3.48)	70.3 (2.77)	71.4 (2.81)	60.4 (2.38)	59.6 (2.35)	69.0 (2.72)	73.6 (2.90)	85.0 (3.35)	69.6 (2.74)	95.8 (3.77)	102.3 (4.03)	93.3 (3.67)	938.7 (36.96)
Average precipitation days (≥ 1.0 mm)	14.4	12.7	12.6	11.3	11.5	11.4	13.0	13.5	11.6	13.8	15.5	14.8	156.2
Mean monthly sunshine hours	40.1	65.2	97.7	157.1	185.1	151.1	146.3	141.9	112.0	92.4	52.9	35.3	1,277
Source 1: Met Office
Source 2: Starlings Roost Weather

Sea temperature data for Belfast
Month	Jan	Feb	Mar	Apr	May	Jun	Jul	Aug	Sep	Oct	Nov	Dec	Year
Average sea temperature °C (°F)	9.1 (48.4)	8.3 (46.9)	8.2 (46.8)	8.9 (48.0)	10.2 (50.4)	11.9 (53.4)	13.7 (56.7)	14.3 (57.7)	14.2 (57.6)	13.4 (56.1)	12.3 (54.1)	10.6 (51.1)	11.2 (52.2)
Source: seatemperature.org

Climate data for Belfast (Stormont Castle) (Note: Weather station is located 3.9 miles (6.3 km) from the Belfast city centre.) CDL ID: 99114; coordinates: 54°36′11″N 5°49′47″W; elevation: 56 m (184 ft); 1991–2020 normals, extremes 1959–present
Month	Jan	Feb	Mar	Apr	May	Jun	Jul	Aug	Sep	Oct	Nov	Dec	Year
Record high °C (°F)	14.7 (58.5)	15.8 (60.4)	20.1 (68.2)	20.9 (69.6)	25.0 (77.0)	29.0 (84.2)	29.7 (85.5)	28.2 (82.8)	25.0 (77.0)	20.6 (69.1)	17.5 (63.5)	15.0 (59.0)	29.7 (85.5)
Mean daily maximum °C (°F)	7.9 (46.2)	8.6 (47.5)	10.3 (50.5)	12.6 (54.7)	15.3 (59.5)	17.6 (63.7)	19.2 (66.6)	18.9 (66.0)	16.9 (62.4)	13.6 (56.5)	10.4 (50.7)	8.3 (46.9)	13.3 (55.9)
Daily mean °C (°F)	5.2 (41.4)	5.5 (41.9)	6.8 (44.2)	8.8 (47.8)	11.3 (52.3)	13.8 (56.8)	15.5 (59.9)	15.3 (59.5)	13.4 (56.1)	10.5 (50.9)	7.6 (45.7)	5.6 (42.1)	9.9 (49.8)
Mean daily minimum °C (°F)	2.5 (36.5)	2.5 (36.5)	3.4 (38.1)	5.0 (41.0)	7.2 (45.0)	10.0 (50.0)	11.7 (53.1)	11.6 (52.9)	10.0 (50.0)	7.5 (45.5)	4.7 (40.5)	2.9 (37.2)	6.6 (43.9)
Record low °C (°F)	−9.9 (14.2)	−6.1 (21.0)	−7.2 (19.0)	−5.6 (21.9)	−1.7 (28.9)	1.7 (35.1)	5.6 (42.1)	4.9 (40.8)	1.1 (34.0)	−0.9 (30.4)	−3.4 (25.9)	−9.1 (15.6)	−9.9 (14.2)
Average precipitation mm (inches)	92.5 (3.64)	71.6 (2.82)	73.9 (2.91)	64.4 (2.54)	67.7 (2.67)	74.4 (2.93)	77.0 (3.03)	86.0 (3.39)	74.6 (2.94)	97.2 (3.83)	102.5 (4.04)	95.2 (3.75)	976.9 (38.46)
Average precipitation days (≥ 1.0 mm)	15.3	13.1	13.3	11.6	12.3	11.5	12.4	13.6	11.5	13.3	15.4	14.5	157.8
Source: KNMI

Climate data for Belfast (Ravenhill Road), (Note: Weather station is located 1.2 miles (1.9 km) from the Belfast city centre.) 8 m (26 ft) amsl, 1991–2020 normals, extremes 1986–present
Month	Jan	Feb	Mar	Apr	May	Jun	Jul	Aug	Sep	Oct	Nov	Dec	Year
Record high °C (°F)	14.5 (58.1)	15.6 (60.1)	20.2 (68.4)	22.7 (72.9)	26.2 (79.2)	30.0 (86.0)	31.2 (88.2)	29.3 (84.7)	24.5 (76.1)	20.0 (68.0)	16.7 (62.1)	15.3 (59.5)	31.2 (88.2)
Mean daily maximum °C (°F)	7.7 (45.9)	8.3 (46.9)	10.4 (50.7)	13.3 (55.9)	16.2 (61.2)	18.6 (65.5)	20.1 (68.2)	19.8 (67.6)	17.4 (63.3)	13.4 (56.1)	10.1 (50.2)	8.0 (46.4)	13.6 (56.5)
Daily mean °C (°F)	5.2 (41.4)	5.5 (41.9)	7.1 (44.8)	9.4 (48.9)	12.1 (53.8)	14.7 (58.5)	16.4 (61.5)	16.1 (61.0)	13.8 (56.8)	10.5 (50.9)	7.4 (45.3)	5.5 (41.9)	10.3 (50.5)
Mean daily minimum °C (°F)	2.7 (36.9)	2.6 (36.7)	3.8 (38.8)	5.5 (41.9)	8.0 (46.4)	10.8 (51.4)	12.6 (54.7)	12.4 (54.3)	10.3 (50.5)	7.6 (45.7)	4.8 (40.6)	3.0 (37.4)	7.0 (44.6)
Record low °C (°F)	−8.3 (17.1)	−5.8 (21.6)	−4.9 (23.2)	−2.2 (28.0)	0.6 (33.1)	2.4 (36.3)	6.1 (43.0)	4.2 (39.6)	2.2 (36.0)	−2.5 (27.5)	−5.0 (23.0)	−11.3 (11.7)	−11.3 (11.7)
Source: Starlings Roost Weather

Climate data for Belfast International Airport WMO ID: 03917; coordinates 54°39′50″N 6°13′30″W; elevation: 63 m (207 ft); 1991–2020 normals, extremes 1930–present
Month	Jan	Feb	Mar	Apr	May	Jun	Jul	Aug	Sep	Oct	Nov	Dec	Year
Record high °C (°F)	14.5 (58.1)	15.6 (60.1)	20.2 (68.4)	23.9 (75.0)	26.1 (79.0)	29.5 (85.1)	30.8 (87.4)	28.0 (82.4)	27.1 (80.8)	21.8 (71.2)	17.1 (62.8)	15.0 (59.0)	30.8 (87.4)
Mean daily maximum °C (°F)	7.3 (45.1)	7.9 (46.2)	9.7 (49.5)	12.3 (54.1)	15.2 (59.4)	17.6 (63.7)	19.1 (66.4)	18.7 (65.7)	16.6 (61.9)	13.1 (55.6)	9.8 (49.6)	7.6 (45.7)	12.9 (55.2)
Daily mean °C (°F)	4.7 (40.5)	4.9 (40.8)	6.3 (43.3)	8.5 (47.3)	11.2 (52.2)	13.8 (56.8)	15.4 (59.7)	15.2 (59.4)	13.2 (55.8)	10.2 (50.4)	7.1 (44.8)	5.0 (41.0)	9.6 (49.3)
Mean daily minimum °C (°F)	2.1 (35.8)	2.0 (35.6)	3.0 (37.4)	4.7 (40.5)	7.1 (44.8)	9.9 (49.8)	11.8 (53.2)	11.7 (53.1)	9.9 (49.8)	7.2 (45.0)	4.4 (39.9)	2.4 (36.3)	6.4 (43.5)
Record low °C (°F)	−12.8 (9.0)	−11.7 (10.9)	−12.2 (10.0)	−5.1 (22.8)	−3.3 (26.1)	−1.2 (29.8)	2.2 (36.0)	1.7 (35.1)	−2.2 (28.0)	−3.9 (25.0)	−8.6 (16.5)	−14.9 (5.2)	−14.9 (5.2)
Average precipitation mm (inches)	77.0 (3.03)	63.3 (2.49)	60.6 (2.39)	55.6 (2.19)	55.9 (2.20)	68.0 (2.68)	78.8 (3.10)	84.5 (3.33)	69.2 (2.72)	88.0 (3.46)	87.7 (3.45)	83.5 (3.29)	872.0 (34.33)
Average precipitation days (≥ 1.0 mm)	14.7	13.2	13.0	12.0	11.6	11.9	14.1	14.2	12.1	14.0	15.5	15.2	161.3
Average snowy days	5	5	4	1	0	0	0	0	0	0	1	3	19
Average relative humidity (%)	89	87	88	89	90	90	90	92	92	91	90	89	91
Mean monthly sunshine hours	48.7	72.1	108.4	157.8	197.9	167.6	152.0	146.4	121.5	91.2	61.3	47.1	1,372
Source 1: Met Office NOAA (relative humidity and snow days 1961–-1990)
Source 2: Servizio Meteorologico (extremes)
