= 1473 heat and drought in Europe =

Natural disaster in Europe

The 1473 heat and drought in Europe was a climatic extreme. The heatwave and drought in 1473–1474 lasted 14 months, affecting Western, Central and Eastern Europe as well as Southern Scandinavia, Ireland, Northern Italy and parts of Spain. This year was the culmination of several years of heat and drought between 1471 and 1474. In terms of its duration and geographical extent, it was probably the most widespread and extreme period of heat and drought in Europe in the past millennium. The weather patterns and their effects were reconstructed based on consistent reports in contemporary historical documents.

The countries affected today are: Southern Sweden, Denmark, England, Ireland, Belgium, the Netherlands, France, Switzerland, Germany, Poland, Ukraine, western Russia, Austria, the Czech Republic, the Slovak Republic, Hungary, Italy, Croatia, Serbia and parts of Spain.

== Data and methods ==
Detailed evidence on weather patterns in 1473 is available in historical documents. Historical climatology deals with the reconstruction of weather and climate, as well as their effects on societies based on documentary evidence, primarily from chronicles. The Palgrave Handbook of Climate History provides an overview of the available methods and data, summarising climatic and socio-economic developments by era and continent.

Here are some basic considerations to take into account: Dating in the 15th century follows the Julian calendar. To align with the Gregorian calendar, nine days must be added to a Julian date. The evidence is obtained from contemporary documents, primarily chronicle weather reports. Narrative data often contain indirect information on temperature conditions (known as proxy data), such as observations of cultivated plants (known as phenology) in the warm season, as well as observations of frozen waters, snow cover, and occasional spring vegetation in the cold season. These narrative and proxy data are summarized in the form of a seasonal index named Pfister index. The Pfister index is the most commonly used temperature and precipitation index. It comprises seven classes on a scale from -3 to +3, indicating deviations from a 20th-century reference period. Seasonal Pfister indices for Central Europe are available for the period 1000–1999.

== Description ==
=== Weather conditions and temperature ===
Parts of Spain remained largely dry during the winter half‑year of 1472–1473, with the area around Seville experiencing drought from September 1472 to May 1473. The winter of 1473 was 'rainy' in Metz and 'without snow or ice' in Basel. In the environment of this town cherry trees began to blossom in early March (Gregorian Calendar) which points to high temperatures in the preceding weeks. April was hot. The vines began to blossom at the beginning of May. The heat was almost unbearable in this month. By the beginning of June, the cherries were ripe, followed by the grapes a month later. Wheat was harvested during the same period. White grapes were picked in Metz starting on 13 August Gregorian Calendar. Red Pinot Noir grapes were picked in Beaune starting on 5 September. Overall, vegetation development began 4–5 months early, as in the 1540 European drought. In autumn, the cherry trees blossomed again. In November, the cherries ripened for the second time. In December, flowers bloomed in Basel amid 'spring-like' temperatures. The following winter, in 1474, was again rainy and frost-free in eastern France and the Baltic Sea was ice-free early on. The 'high mountains' visible from Basel — presumably the peaks of the Black Forest, which are between 1,200 and 1,500 meters high, remained snow-free throughout the winter, as Basel lawyer Johannes Knebel noted in his diary. Snowfall on 2 March 1474 brought an end to the longest warm and dry period recorded until 2024, which had lasted 14 months.

==== Maps of estimated temperatures ====
Spatial reconstruction of temperatures in Europe for the year 1473. Brown‑red shading indicates positive, and blue shading negative temperature anomalies relative to the 1961–1990 climatological baseline. The map is derived from a data‑assimilation (Reanalysis) approach that integrates climate model simulations with documentary evidence and tree‑ring proxy records.

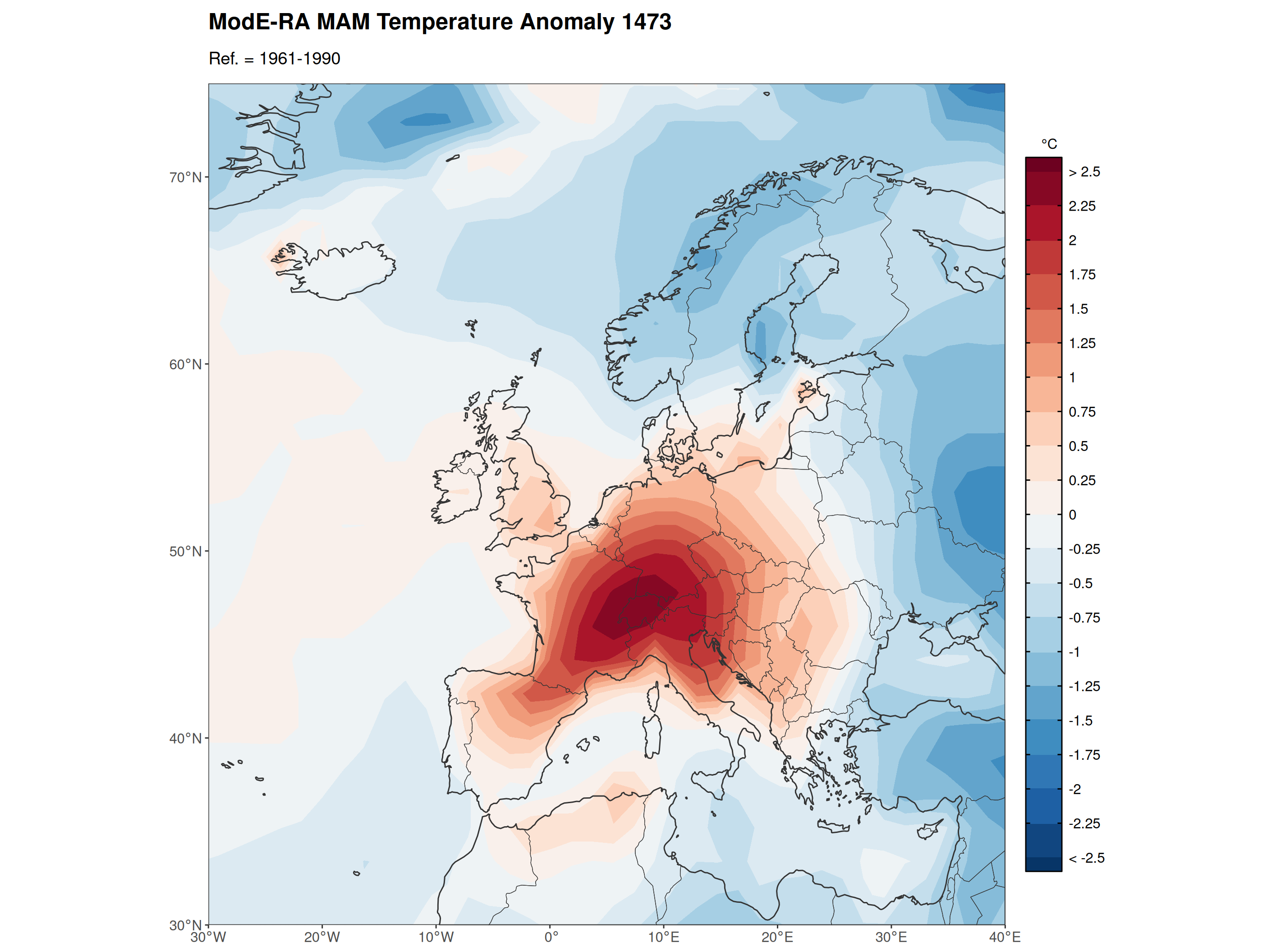
Spatial reconstruction of spring temperatures in Europe for the year 1473

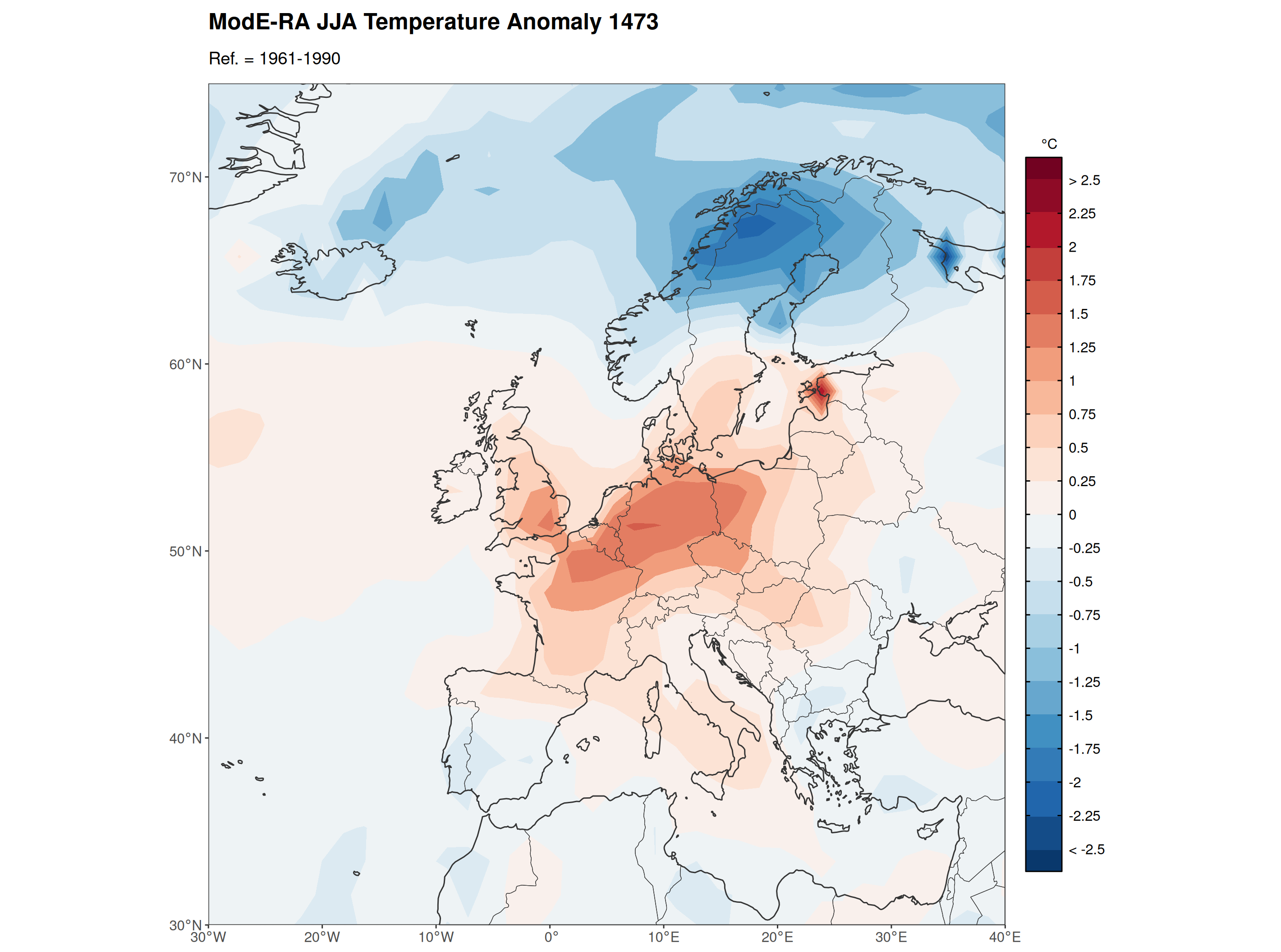
Spatial reconstruction of summer temperatures in Europe for the year 1473

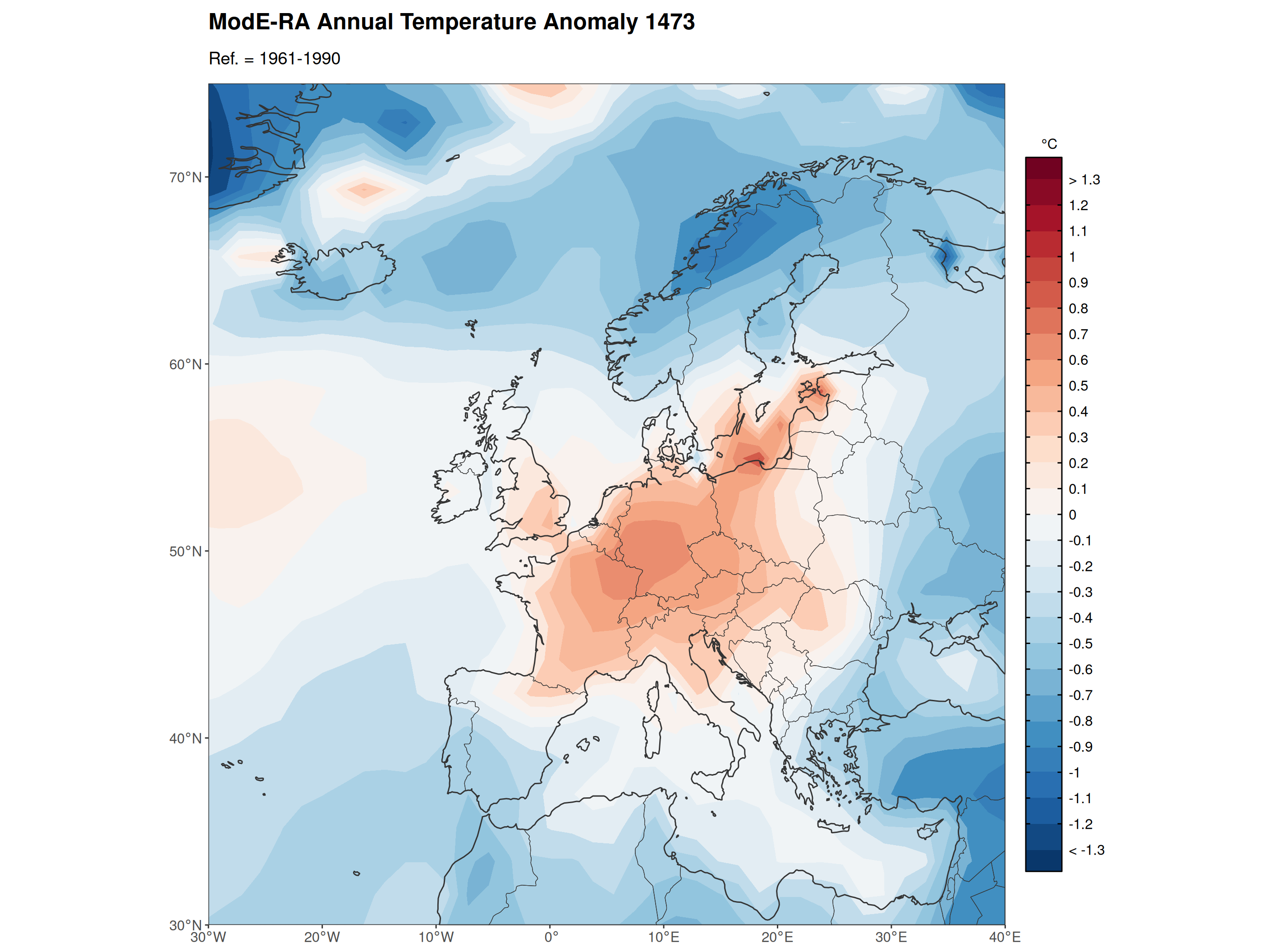
Spatial reconstruction of the annual temperatures in Europe for the year 1473

=== Precipitation ===
Some concerned chroniclers recorded the beginning and end of the period without significant precipitation. Parts of Spain, including the Seville area, were largely dry during the winter months of 1472–73. In Zierikzee in the Netherlands, there was no rain from May to October. The drought in Bohemia lasted three and a half months, from 2 May to 20 November in Wroclaw (then called Breslau) and during the nine weeks from 29 June to mid-September in Basel. The year 1473 marked the culmination of a series of warm winters and hot, dry summers spanning from 1471 to 1474. This multi-year heat surge is unique within the context of the European Little Ice Age, which spanned from 1340 to around 1900. It was probably triggered by dry spring periods which severely dried out the soil, thereby amplifying the effect of summer solar radiation.

=== Hydrological and ecological effects ===
In late summer, deciduous trees in the Basel area shed their leaves and looked 'like Christmas'. Springs, streams, and smaller rivers dried up completely; larger rivers, such as the Moselle, dwindled to trickles; and shallow watercourses in the Netherlands stank terribly. Meandering large rivers such as the Rhine and the Danube could be crossed on foot in places. Rivers in Poland, Ukraine and western Russia also had low water levels. Large swarms of migratory locusts plagued Europe in the following years.

== Scientific discussion ==
An investigation of stalagmites (Speleothem) in north-eastern Hungary concludes that the 1470s were a warm, dry period. In 2015, American climatologist Edward Cook and 54 colleagues published a synthesis of severe droughts in Africa and Eurasia: This study is primarily based on data from tree rings (Palaeoclimatology). The spatial extent of the 1473 drought largely coincides with contemporary weather reports. The authors mention a 15th-century mega-drought in north-central Europe, during which the most intense phase of drought lasted 37 years, from 1437 to 1473.

== Socio-economic and health impacts ==
Most mills stopped working, causing shortages of flour and bread. In some areas, the supply of drinking water also dried up. Widespread forest, bush and settlement fires broke out. Forest fires were very common and, since there was insufficient water to put them out, especially destructive. Numerous beekeeping trees and most spring crops died due to drought. Northern Italy and parts of Spain experienced crop failures and famines following long periods of drought in autumn and winter. In Spain, 'conversos' were scapegoated for the misery and burned at the stake. Numerous deaths in the Netherlands, England and Hungary were attributed to the heat and/or associated infectious diseases ('pestis'). These were probably cases of dysentery. "In the year 1473, on August 9th /18th , there was a procession against sudden death, as well as for rain during a dry and hot period. No one living in these lands remembered such an excessively hot time, with no rain, causing the grapes on the stalks to wither and spoil almost entirely. The drought was deadly throughout the summer, with accounts stating more men died than women. “These illnesses appear to have included episodes of acute fever characterized by pronounced hyperthermia, severe thirst, and inflammatory responses. In addition, bacterial dysentery—transmitted through contaminated water and flies—was widespread and particularly lethal for young children. Following the extreme heat and drought of the summer of 1719, an epidemic of dysentery in France killed 450,000 people, equivalent to 2% of the population at the time.

== Literature ==
- Chantal Camenisch, Rudolf Brázdil, Andrea Kiss et al.: Extreme heat and drought in 1473 and their impacts in Europe in the context of the early 1470s, in: Regional Environmental Change (2020) 20:19 (doi:10.1007/s10113-020-01601-0)
- Christian Pfister, Heinz Wanner, Climate and Society in Europe. The last thousand years. Bern, Haupt 2021. ISBN 978-3-258-08234-9.
