= European drought =

European drought may refer to:

- 1540 European drought
- 2018 European drought and heat wave
- 2022 European drought
- 2023 European drought
- 2026 European drought
