= John Huxham =

English surgeon (1692–1768)

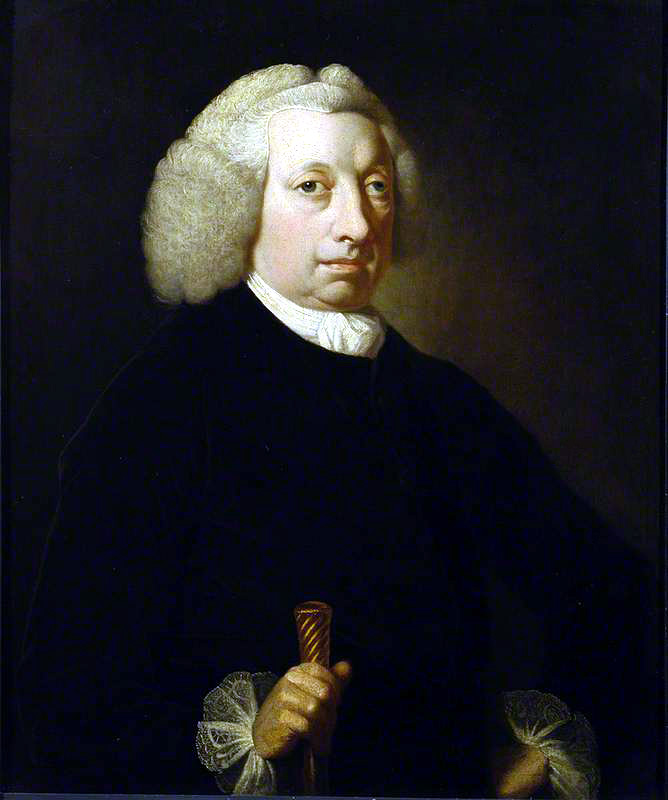
1756 portrait of Huxham by Thomas Reynell

John Huxham (1692–1768) was an English physician, a provincial doctor notable for his study of fevers. In 1750 Huxham published his Essay on Fevers and in 1755 received the Copley Medal for his contribution to medicine.

== Biography ==
Huxham was born close to Totnes, Devon, the son of a butcher from nearby Harberton. He was orphaned in early life and became the ward of a non-conformist minister. He attended Newton Abbot grammar school using funds from his father's will. Huxham then attended Exeter academy, the university of Leyden and finishing his M.D. at the university of Rheims. (Due to his religion he would not have been able to attend Universities in Oxford or Cambridge.)

He returned to Totnes and started a medical practice soon after in Plymouth. His progress to fame was slow but he eventually became the city's most respected medical practitioner.

In 1723, James Jurin, one of the secretaries of the Royal Society, asked for volunteers to keep daily records of their observations of the weather including readings of the barometric pressure, temperature, rainfall, and direction and strength of the wind. Their observations were to be submitted annually to the secretaries of the society for collation and analysis. In 1724 Huxham began to keep such records and, from 1728 on until 1748, he noted monthly the prevalence of epidemic diseases. These records he published in two volumes. He was elected Fellow of the Royal Society in 1739.

Huxham was perhaps the first in Britain to classify the disease influenza. He is also associated with diagnosis of scurvy and for a recommended cure of drinking cider. He is also remembered for Tinct. cort. Peruv. Huxham, a tincture of Cinchona bark used for ulcerous sore throat (possibly diphtheria).

He married Ellen Corham, and after her death Elizabeth Harris, who also died before him. He left two daughters and one son, John Corham Huxham, who graduated at Exeter College, Oxford, became F.R.S., and edited several of his father's works. He died on 11 August 1768.

== Works ==
- Medicinisch und chymische Bemerkungen vom Spießglase . J.A. Lübeck, Leipzig; Bayreuth 1759 Digital edition by the University and State Library Düsseldorf
