= Heatwave (English band) =

British pop group

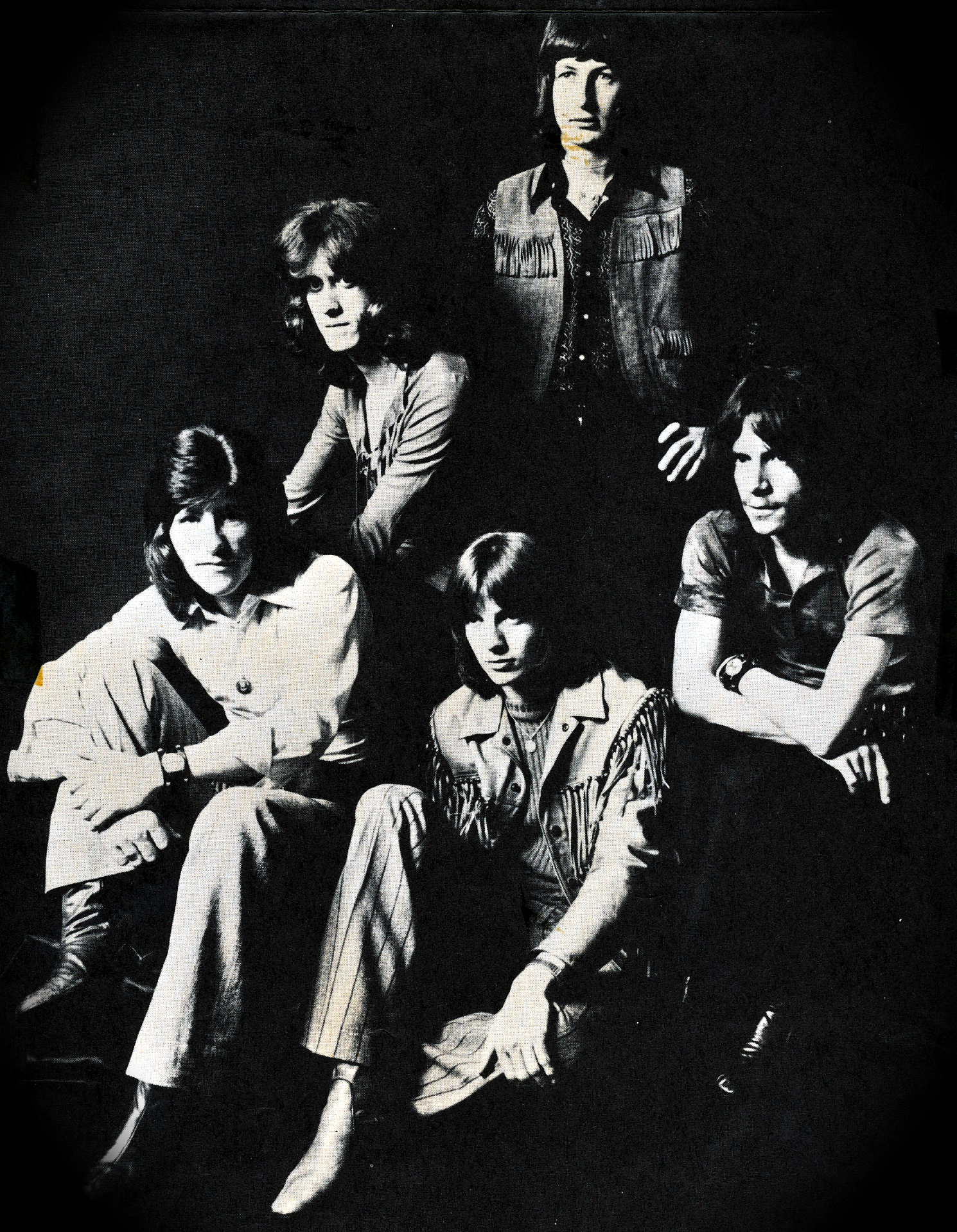
- Heatwave, 1970

Background information
- Origin: London, England
- Genres: Pop, funk
- Years active: 1969–1972
- Labels: Penny Farthing Records
- Past members: John Fellows; Terry Shea; Richard Steen; Martin Samuel; Peter Allatt
- Website: heatwave.n.nu

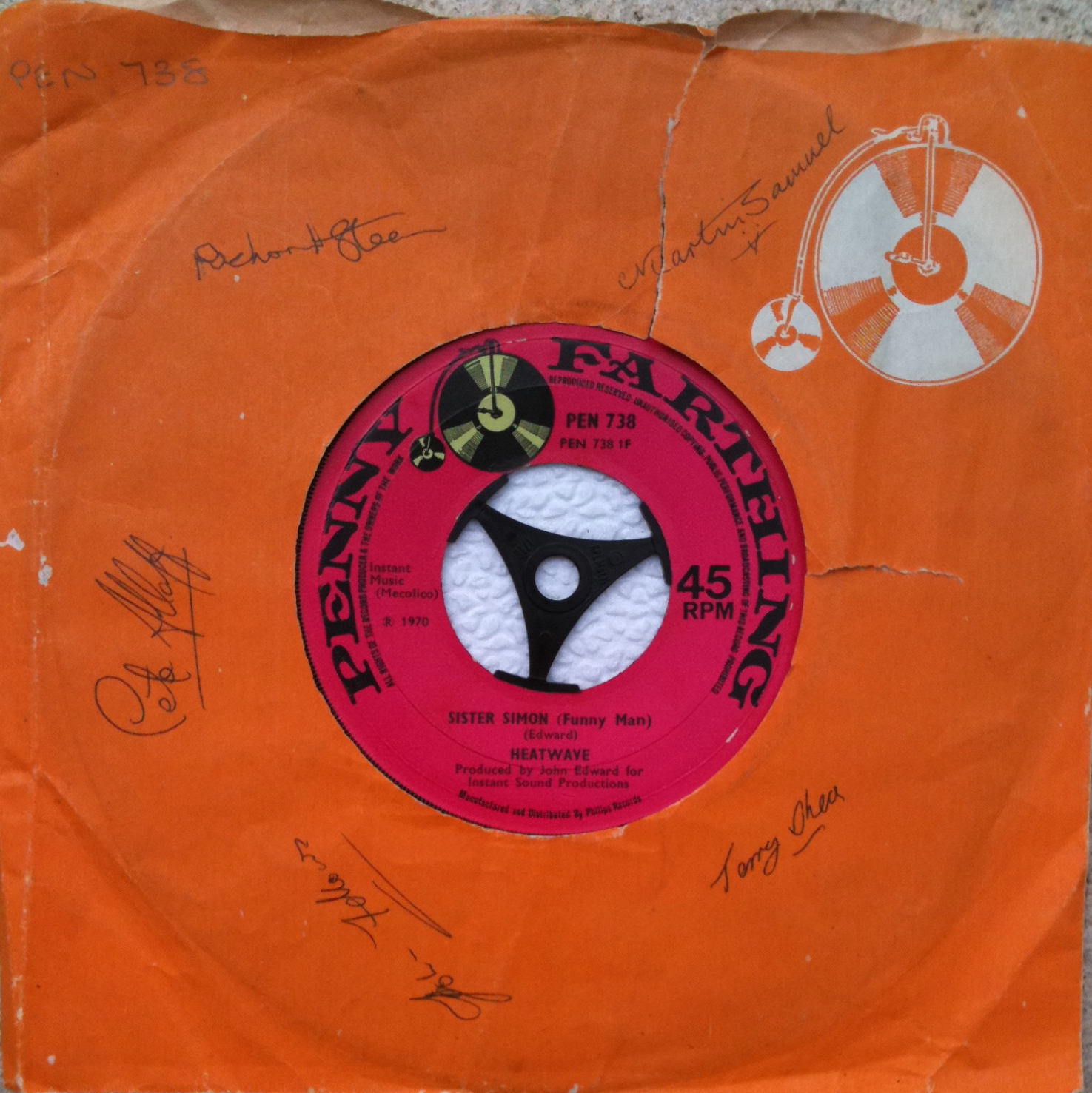
Heatwave autographed single sleeve 1970

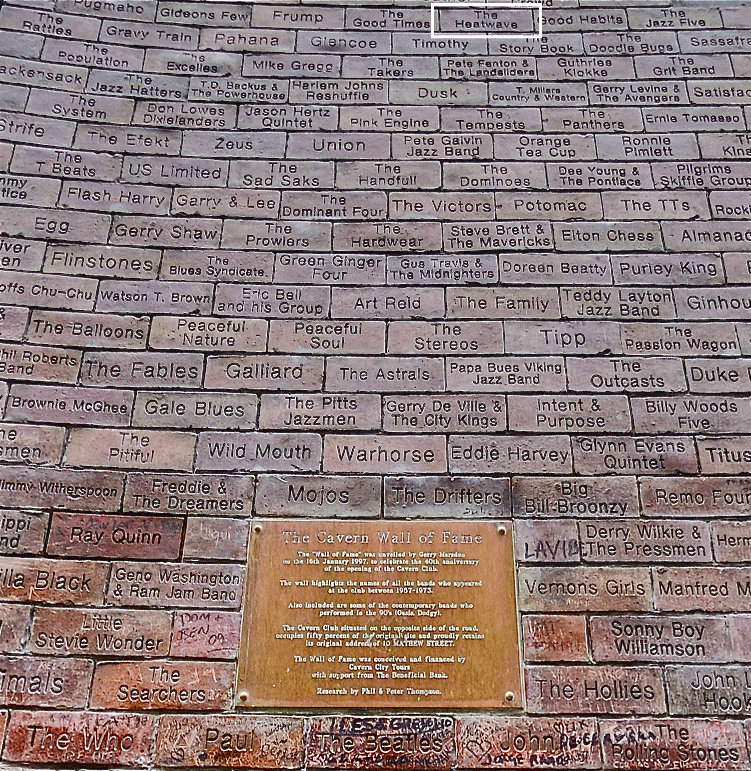
The Heatwave Cavern Club Wall of Fame

Heatwave were an English pop band from London, active from 1969–1972.

Known as The Moving Targets, featuring John Fellows (bass and vocals), Terry Shea (rhythm guitar and vocals); Richard Steen (lead guitar and vocals), they auditioned for a drummer in 1969 and Martin Samuel (drums and pyrotechnics) was signed; they became Heatwave. They were a progressive pop harmony group, doing local gigs, playing cover versions of the popular artists of the day with lead vocals shared between Terry and John with a few songs from Richard.

In the winter of 1969, Johnny Edward Entertainment Agency was looking for pop groups, Heatwave auditioned and the band was asked to sign that same night. Touring the country as a four-piece, playing four sets a night, they became a tight vocal harmony band with a solid dance beat, often 'opening' for 'name' acts while earning a large fan following.

John Edward believed that the band needed a stronger voice to be a successful recording group and set up auditions with an advert in the Melody Maker. Peter Allatt (lead vocals and percussion) then completed the group as a five-piece. Playing one night stands around the country, The Pheasantry (London), California Ballroom (Dunstable) and the Cavern Club (Liverpool), where they have a brick in the Wall of Fame, were three of many favourite venues played. The band's stage gear was made by The Carnaby Cavern in Ganton Street, just off Carnaby Street. A stage act was later suggested whereupon Martin incorporated a pyrotechnic display of fire eating.

Heatwave was invited to appear on the Terry Wogan radio show without having the usual audition; from that, they were given the opportunity to record for the Dave Cash, Kenny Everett, Dave Lee Travis, Jimmy Young, and Radio One Club shows–Heatwave became one of the most-oft heard 'live' professional bands on BBC Radio One between 1969 and 1970.

On 16 October 1970, Heatwave released "Sister Simon (Funny Man)" b/w "Rastus Ravel (Is a Mean Old Man)", (PEN 738) on the Larry Page Penny Farthing Records label. Both songs were written and produced by John Edward for Instant Sound Productions. The single featured Rick Wakeman on keyboards and Doris Troy with Maggie Stredder, Gloria George and Marian Davis, The Ladybirds, as back-up singers.

On 2 April 2013, "Rastus Ravel (Is A Mean Old Man)", was re-released as track 4 on Piccadilly Sunshine, Part Twelve – British Pop Psych and Other Flavours 1967-1971, on the bootleg Particles label. On 11 April 2013, Paul Martin reviewed Piccadilly Sunshine, Part Twelve in Shindig magazine and wrote, "... here's another hamper of low calorie sooth-sayers with pictures to paint. The indulgence food in this particular feast comes from Heatwave's "phat" mod-soul funker, "Rastus Ravel". On 24 April 2013, Newtracks (Germany) selected "Rastus Ravel (Is Mean Old Man)" for the music game, Bands, which was played on Facebook and mobile devices.
