= The Heatwave =

- Origin: Bristol, England
- Genres: Dancehall
- Years active: 2003 – present
- Labels: Heat Wax, Soul Jazz Records
- Website: theheatwave.co.uk

The Heatwave is a dancehall sound system and production crew from London. They have performed at clubs and festivals worldwide since 2003, and produced and released music since 2004.

== Biography ==
The Heatwave, a collective founded by Gabriel Myddelton, comprises DJs, MCs and dancers and are known for their wild parties and informative radio shows. They draw together music from Jamaica and England and work to highlight the importance of dancehall in the UK. The Heatwave's compilations and mixes have shown how dancehall is at the root of British club music genres like jungle, garage, grime, dubstep and funky house.

The Heatwave started out as dancehall promoters, advertising their east London parties with fly posters and selling 7" vinyl records out the boot of Gabriel's car. They presented Rinse FM’s only dancehall show when the station was still a pirate, and their Hot Wuk nights take place across the UK.

=== Production ===
The Heatwave's 2017 single 'Walk Out Gyal' featuring Mr Lexx & Keida was nominated for Track of the Year at Gilles Peterson’s Worldwide Awards. Their 2018 release 'Closer To Me' featuring Stylo G was chosen by Toddla T as his Coldest Record on BBC Radio 1Xtra.

The Heatwave have been known for remixing hit songs in a dancehall style ever since the 2004 release of Trick Me Twice, which blended Trick Me by Kelis with dancehall vocalists Beenie Man and T.O.K. In 2011, they remixed Jamie xx's remix of Adele's hit 'Rolling In The Deep', adding vocals by Cecile, Mr Lexx and Timberlee. The Heatwave have also remixed tracks by artists such as TNGHT, Mosca, Popcaan Stylo G.

=== Live Shows ===
The Heatwave appear regularly at Notting Hill Carnival and in August 2016 they hosted a carnival sound system alongside Different Strokes and Island Records. They have performed at festivals such as Glastonbury, SXSW, Boomtown, Outlook, Bestival and Lovebox and have supported Sean Paul at concerts in London and Bristol.

=== Hot Wuk ===
The Heatwave launched their Hot Wuk party in 2009 and were joined soon after by resident DJ and UK garage producer Sticky. From 2012, the Hot Wuk parties began to tour multiple cities around the UK, including Bristol, Leeds, Nottingham, Manchester, Birmingham, Brighton, Edinburgh, Cardiff, Southampton, and Bournemouth.

Hot Wuk parties are known for high energy live performances, dance crews, whistles and horns, warm and cheerful crowds, carnival trucks, MCs and DJs, and raucous behaviour. The London parties have been held in venues such as KOKO, Kentish Town Forum, Electric Brixton, Oval Space, East Village, The Social, and Electric Ballroom.

=== Showtime ===
In June 2011, The Heatwave organised and promoted an event called Showtime. The show featured MCs such as General Levy, Wiley, Skibadee, Glamma Kid, Stylo G, Lady Leshurr, Stush, YT, Mr Williamz, Lady Chann, Asher Senator, Riko Dan, Flowdan, Serocee, and Rubi Dan sharing the microphone in sound system style. It was recorded and made into a DVD by Rollo Jackson featuring live performances and in-depth interviews that chart an oral history of UK dancehall.

The crew took the Showtime concept to Birmingham in June 2012 with a line-up that included Gappy Ranks, Rodney P, Top Cat, Durrty Goodz, Serocee, Lady Leshurr, RoxXxan, Juki Ranx, RTKAL, Vital, and Rubi Dan.

In June 2019, Showtime returned for a month-long residency at The Jazz Café in London. The events told the story of dancehall in the UK across four decades, featuring MCs and DJs such as Tippa Irie, Ragga Twins, Horseman, Trevor Sax, Top Cat, Sweetie Irie, Glamma Kid, Victor V, Stush, Maxwell D, Bushkin, Sticky, Lisa Mercedez, Mr Williamz, J Kaz, and Sir DJ Corey.

=== Radio & Compilations ===
The Heatwave have been resident on Rinse FM since 2009 and host a quarterly show on NTS Radio. They appear regularly as guests on BBC 1Xtra shows and have also held two residencies on the station's Xtra Talent series.

In 2008, The Heatwave compiled 'An England Story' for Soul Jazz Records. Their 2013 compilation 'Gyal Power', focusing on female dancehall MCs, was favourably reviewed by The Guardian, NME and Independent.

== Selected discography ==
- An England Story: The Culture of the MC in the UK 1984-2008 – Soul Jazz Records, 2008
- Things Change ft Warrior Queen – Soul Jazz Records, 2008
- Mind How You Talk ft Riko Dan – The Heatwave, 2008
- War Dance ft Serocee – Scattermusic, 2012
- Stopwatch ft K More – Heat Wax, 2017
- London City ft Ding Dong – Heat Wax, 2017
- Walk Out Gyal ft Mr Lexx & Keida – Heat Wax, 2017
- Closer To Me ft Stylo G – Heat Wax, 2018
- Tun Ova ft Tippa Irie – Heat Wax, 2018
- Frontline ft Vanessa Bling – Heat Wax, 2019
