= 2021 British Isles heatwaves =

Period of unusually hot weather in the summer of 2021

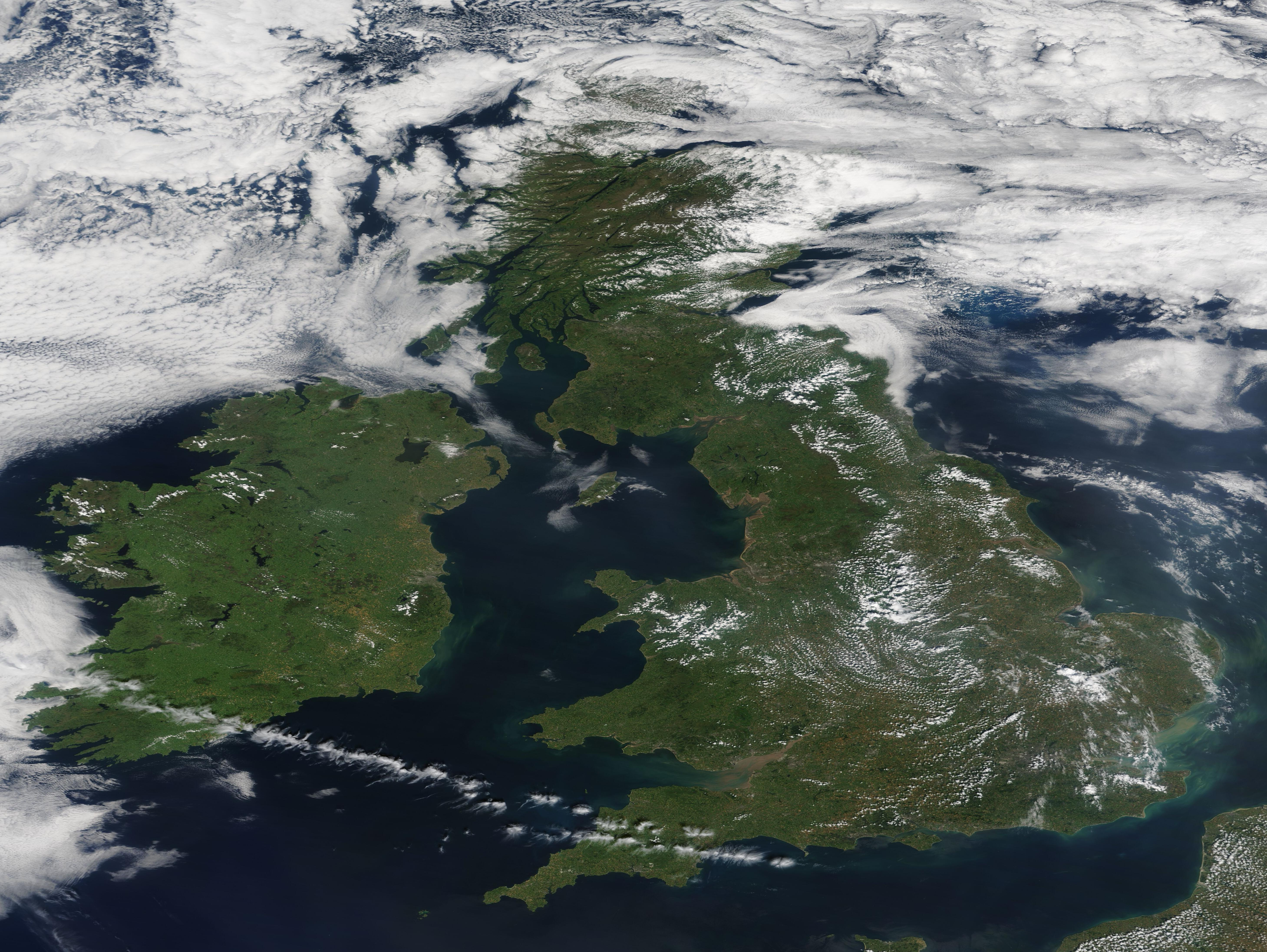
Britain and Ireland from space on 20 July 2021

The 2021 Britain and Ireland heatwaves was a period of unusually hot weather in 2021, with heatwaves in July and September. The July heatwave that led to record-breaking temperatures in the UK and Ireland. Temperatures soared across the United Kingdom over a weekend which saw all four nations record the hottest day of the year. The two heatwaves contributed to the death of more than 1,600 people in England, most of whom were 65 years or over.

== Background ==
The Met Office, the UK's national weather and climate service, introduced extreme heatwarnings in June 2021 due to a greatly increased chance of extreme heat events. The warnings are intended to help people and organisations prepare for the health and infrastructure impacts of extreme heat. There were 2,256 excess deaths during summer heatwaves in England in 2021. At that point, it was the highest figure on record.

== July heatwave ==
July 2021 United Kingdom and Ireland heatwave
Meteorological history
- Duration: 15-25 July 2021
- Heat event
- Max temp: 32.2 °C (90.0 °F), recorded at Heathrow Airport, London on 21 July 2021

Overall effects
- Fatalities: 915 (England)
- Areas affected: British Isles

=== Events ===
On 17 July, temperatures reached 31.2 °C (88.2 °F) in County Down, Northern Ireland. On 18 July, temperatures reached 31.6 °C (88.9 °F) at Heathrow Airport, London and 30.2 °C (86.4 °F) in Cardiff, Wales. On 19 July, the Met Office issued its first ever extreme heat warning for parts of the UK.

In the Republic of Ireland, Met Éireann issued its first ever Status Orange high temperature warning for six counties on 20 July, after temperatures reached 29.5 °C (85.1 °F) in Athenry, County Galway on 17 July.

On 21 July, temperatures reached 32.2 °C (90.0 °F) at Heathrow, London. In Ireland, temperatures reached 30.8 °C (87.4 °F) at Mount Dillon, County Roscommon. In Northern Ireland a new record for maximum temperature was set, with 31.3 °C (88.3 °F) was reached at Castlederg, County Tyrone.

Despite the extreme weather warning, the 2021 July heatwave was relatively mild in comparison to heatwaves in the UK and Ireland of previous and subsequent years, with heatwaves in previous years surpassing the maximum temperature of this heatwave, particularly in the south east.

=== Impact ===
==== Health ====
The heatwave contributed to the death of more than 900 people in England, most of whom were 65 years or over. The Welsh Ambulance Service experienced a 30% increase in the number of calls for life-threatening incidents.

==== Infrastructure ====
The surface of roads including the A396 and B3224 melted during the heatwave. In London, the mayor launched a network to help the public find areas to find free access to cool spaces. The scheme continued running in later years.

==== Environmental ====
Thousands of fish in a pool in Somerset died during the heatwave; it was thought that the heat caused low levels of oxygen in the water.

== September heatwave ==
September 2021 United Kingdom and Ireland heatwave
- Heat event

Overall effects
- Fatalities: 719 (England)

The September heatwave broke the record for consecutive days in September with the temperature reaching 30 °C (86 °F) or above. The night of 7 to 8 September saw Wales break a 72-year-old record for the warmest September night: Aberporth on the Ceredigion Coast Path recorded an overnight low of 20.5 °C (68.9 °F).

=== Impact ===
==== Health ====
The heatwave contributed to the death of more than 700 people in England, most of whom were 65 years or over.

== See also ==
- 2019 European heat waves
- 2018 British Isles heat wave
- 2006 European heat wave
- 2003 European heat wave
- 1995 British Isles heat wave
- 1976 British Isles heat wave
