= The year-round heat and drought of 1540 in Europe =

Natural disaster in Europe

The year round heat and drought in 1540 was the worst climatic event of this kind since the 1473 heat and drought in Europe. It had catastrophic consequences in large parts of the continent, and has been described as an unprecedented eleven-month-long megadrought. From February until the end of the year it was exceptionally warm with sparse rainfall. Following a hot, dry spring, the event was triggered by a high-pressure system (an omega block) in the summer, which blocked the Atlantic air currents for several months while cool, showery weather prevailed in western Russia. Estimated annual temperatures in 1540 were by far the highest between 1500 and 2000, while estimated precipitation was by far the lowest registered until 2025. The effects of this endless heat and drought, the most severe since 1473, on natural areas and human communities are described in detail in over 220 chronicles.

The contemporary countries affected were France, the London Basin in England, Belgium, the Netherlands, Luxembourg, Germany, Switzerland, Austria, the Czech Republic, the Slovak Republic, Poland, Slovenia, northern and central Italy, and southern Spain.

== Weather conditions ==
According to the chronicle of winegrower Hans Stolz, the weather in Guebwiller (Guebwiller) was largely dry from 10 February to mid-June after a moderately cold January. There was some rain at the beginning of March. April and May were almost entirely sunny and very warm. From the end of June to 4 August, there was sweltering heat without a drop of rain. In August and September, it rained several times, but only lightly. From October to the end of December, the weather was similar to that in April, with no frost or snowfall. Similar results are provided by the daily records of the Polish scientist and theologian Marcin Biem in Kraków.

== Data and methods ==
The high-resolution reconstruction of temperature and precipitation conditions is based primarily on data and methods from historical climatology. Temperature conditions are based on a study by Petr Dobrovolny and co-authors about monthly, seasonal and annual temperature reconstructions for Central Europe derived from documentary evidence and instrumental records since AD 1500.

These are mainly based on phenological observations, i.e. the recording of annually recurring growth phenomena in cultivated plants such as flowering, leaf budding and fruit ripening, especially those of vines (phenology). In 2013, a climate history study showed that the temperature in the summer of 1540 was probably higher than that in the hot summer of 2003.

The summer of 1540 was an outlier in terms of climate during the Little Ice Age, as the following four summers were cold. Isolated hot summers were relatively common in Central Europe between 1350 and 1719, occurring after periods of severe soil drying during hot, dry springs. By contrast, such summers were remarkably rare between 1720 and 1987.

The Swiss reformer and scientist Heinrich Bullinger noted that it never rained for a whole day or night in Zurich between February and the end of September. Four considered chroniclers in the Swiss Plateau kept precise records of the timing and, in some cases, the perceived abundance of precipitation. Based on their data, monthly precipitation amounts in the Swiss Plateau have been estimated using model calculations. The evaluation of daily observations in Krakow, Poland yields a comparable result.

== Scientific evaluation and discussion ==
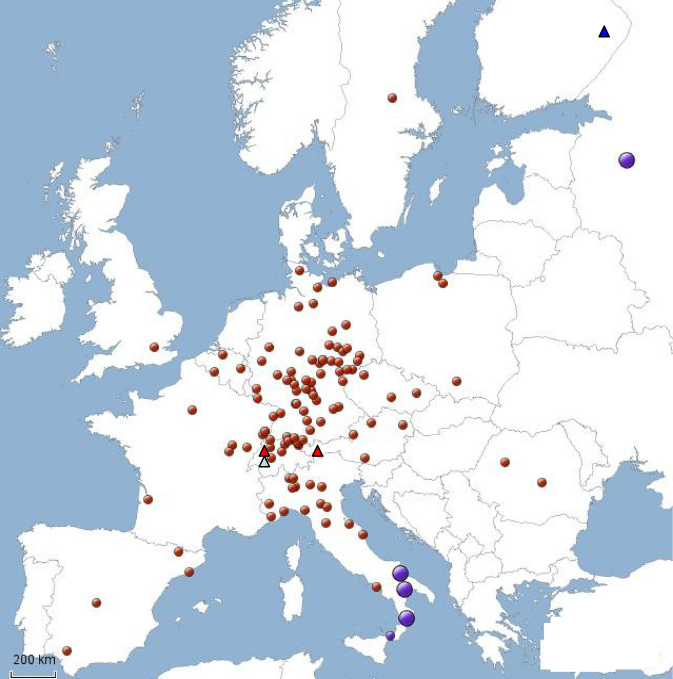
Spatial distribution of 1540 documentary data related to the occurrence of drought. Dots: documentary data evidence (chronicler reports, official letters, rogation ceremonies for rain etc.) of drought (red) and abundance of precipitation (blue; in southern Italy the abundance of precipitation was only during spring).

A 2015 study, based on the evaluation of growth rings from various European tree species (dendroclimatology), concluded that the analyses did not provide evidence of an exceptional drought in 1540.

In their response, the authors of the original 2014 study (Wetter et al.) emphasised that growth rings sometimes reflect hot and dry extremes incompletely or with a delay. They also noted that, in recent times, climatic 'outliers' have often led to discrepancies between instrumentally determined and tree-ring data, a phenomenon known as the "divergence problem".

In 2015, the American climatologist Edward Cook and 54 colleagues presented a synthesis of severe droughts in the Old World (Africa and Eurasia). It is based primarily on data from tree rings . The spatial distribution of the drought of 1540 (Figure 2) largely coincides with the observations of chroniclers.

The year 1540 was probably the hottest and driest in western and central Europe between 1500 and 2000. In Spain, 1540 marked the start of a longer period of very low rainfall, while conditions in the eastern Mediterranean may have been comparatively favourable.

A 2016 publication assumes that the average summer temperature in 1540 was above the corresponding average values for the 1966–2015 time series and, with a 20 per cent probability, exceeded the 2003 heatwave. In this context, the existing uncertainties in the available data were also mentioned, making it difficult to reliably reconstruct temperatures for short-term anomalies that occurred during the last millennium. A reanalysis of the Central European climate from 1421 to 2008 found, by contrast, that the summer of 2003 was hotter. However, the 1540 heat and drought lasted longer than in 2003 and extended over a larger area, and the years preceding 1540 had already been very dry. Only the summer of 1590 was probably even hotter, but its heat spell was much shorter, falling within an otherwise cool and wet decade.

The hot summer 2003 was long considered historically unique since the Middle Ages. However, this assessment has since been put into perspective. The summer 2015 and the summer 2018 were similarly intense but longer lasting and more widespread than that of 2003 . Furthermore, it was revealed that the extremely early date set for the grape harvest in summer 2003 was based on a misleading order by the prefect. The prefect had set the official date far too early.

In the decade from 1531 to 1540, summers were on average as warm as those in the period 1961-1990. However, the subsequent summers from 1541 to 1544 were rather cold. Relatively common in Central Europe between 1350 and 1719, isolated heat summers followed severe soil drying in hot, dry springs

The estimated annual temperatures, the highest between 1500 and 1999, were 2.4 °C (± 0.39 °C) higher in 1540 than in 1961–1990.

The weather conditions of 1540 present a paradoxical situation since this exceptional year occurred during the Little Ice Age, which lasted approximately from the early 15th to the mid-19th century. However, the question raised by some studies focuses more on whether this singular event could serve as a "blueprint" for future climatic developments in this geographical context. According to several scientific studies, there has been a clear tendency worldwide towards the formation of warm and dry climates in recent decades. With further warming, the disappearance of existing climate zones and the establishment of new ones in Central Europe will likely occur, similar to what happened at least to some extent almost 500 years ago.

== Description ==
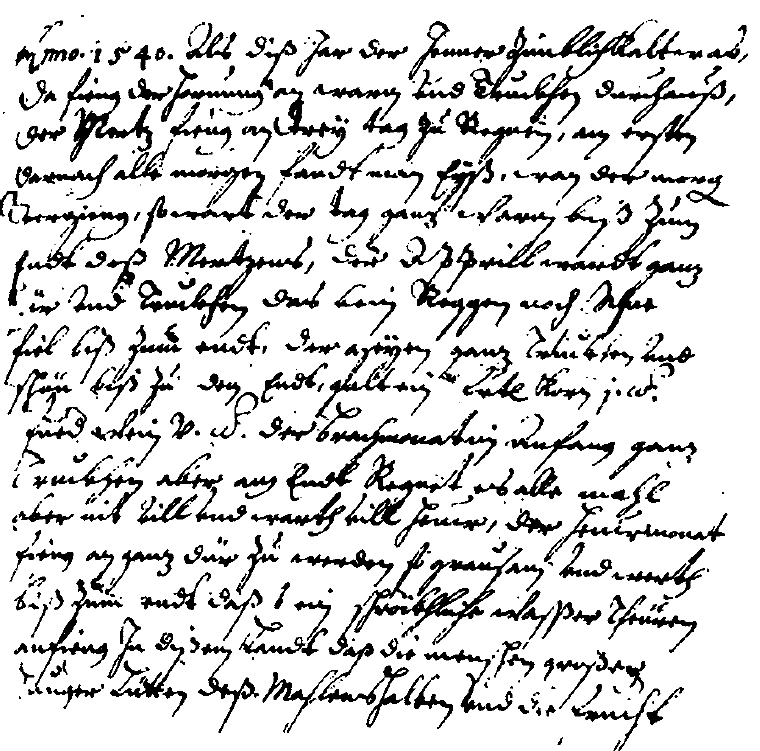
German-language chronicle kept by the winegrower Hans Stolz from Guebwiller (France) for 1540: "Anno 1540 January [from 10th Jan to 9th Feb] was rather cold. February was warm and dry until the end. In March it rained for three days. Then ice was found every morning, but days were warm. April was completely without rain or snow, Likewise, May was sunny and dry, June was dry, except that some rain fell in the end [...]. July [10 July to 9th Aug] was terribly hot and dry throughout so that water became scarce and expensive."

According to the chronicle of winemaker Hans Stoltz of Guebwiller (Gebweiler) today in France, it was largely dry from 10 February until mid-June, following a moderately cold winter. There was some rain at the beginning of March. April and May were sunny and very warm almost all the time, and from the end of June to 4 August it was scorching hot with no rain at all. August and September saw several rainy days, but only a little rain fell. From October to the end of December, the weather was comparable to April with no frost nor snow. In England no rainfall was registered from June to early October

=== The endless heat ===
The monthly and seasonal differences compared to the 1961–1990 period in Germany, Switzerland and the Czech Republic were estimated using plant phenological (phenology) and cold-related proxy data alongside detailed reports (historical climatology).

Cherry trees were in full bloom around 10 April. One month later, the cherries were ripe. The vine blossom ended before 10 June. The first ripe grapes were picked in Zurich a month later, corresponding to a vegetation lead of 4–5 weeks. By the beginning of August, the grapes were ripe in many vineyards, but the berries had dried up. Therefore, many vine growers decided to wait until September, when there would be more abundant rainfall, before harvesting.

Extremely high temperatures were experienced in April, May. Reconstructed April-to-July temperatures were an estimated 4.7 to 6.8 °C above the 1901–2000 regional mean. In July, maximum temperatures of over 40 °C were probably reached.

==== Maps of estimated temperatures ====
Spatial reconstruction of temperatures in Europe for the year 1540. Brown‑red shading indicates positive, and blue shading negative temperature anomalies relative to the 1961–1990 climatological baseline. The map is derived from a data‑assimilation (Reanalysis) approach that integrates climate model simulations with documentary evidence and tree‑ring proxy records.

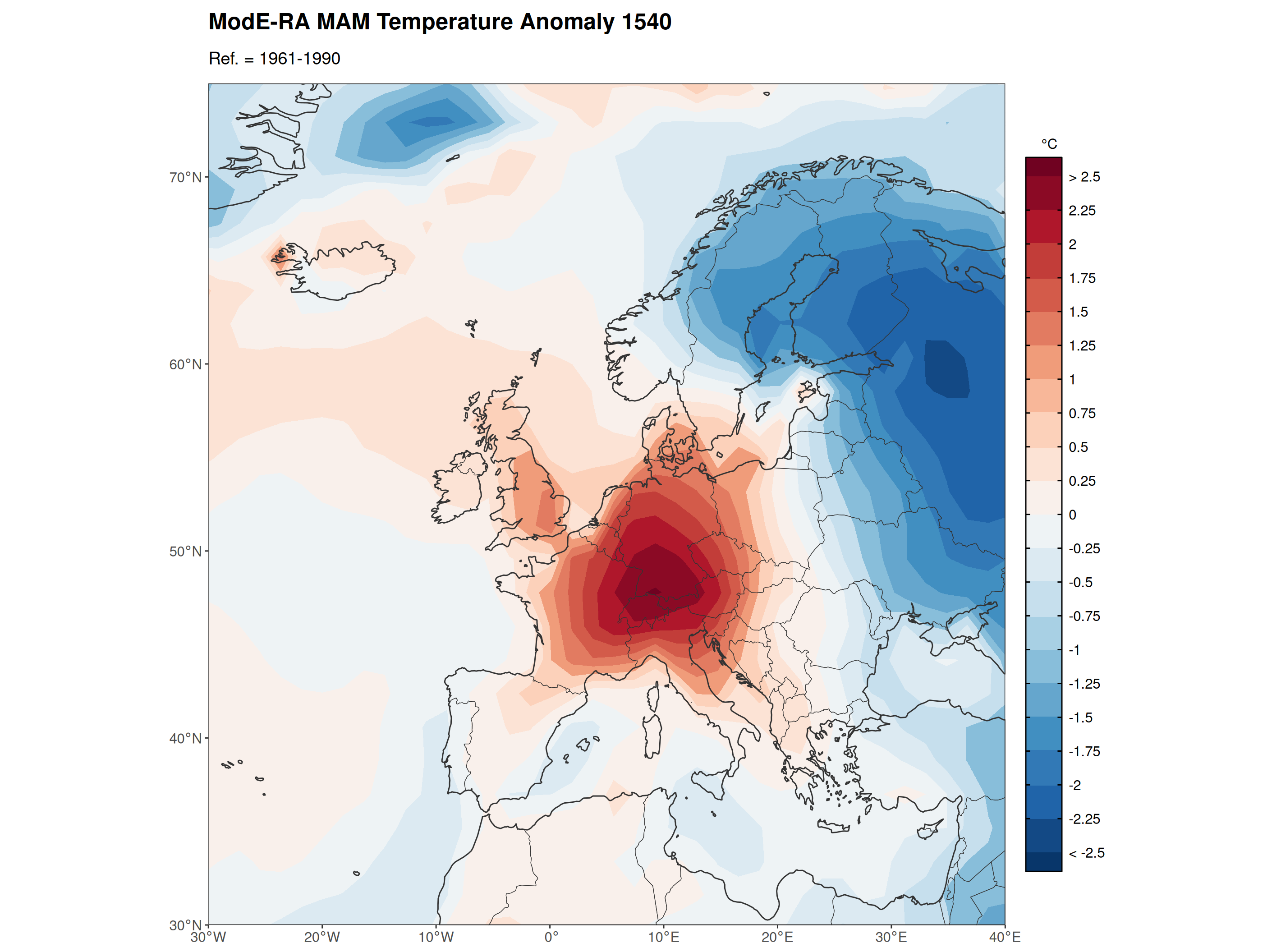
Temperature anomaly Spring 1540

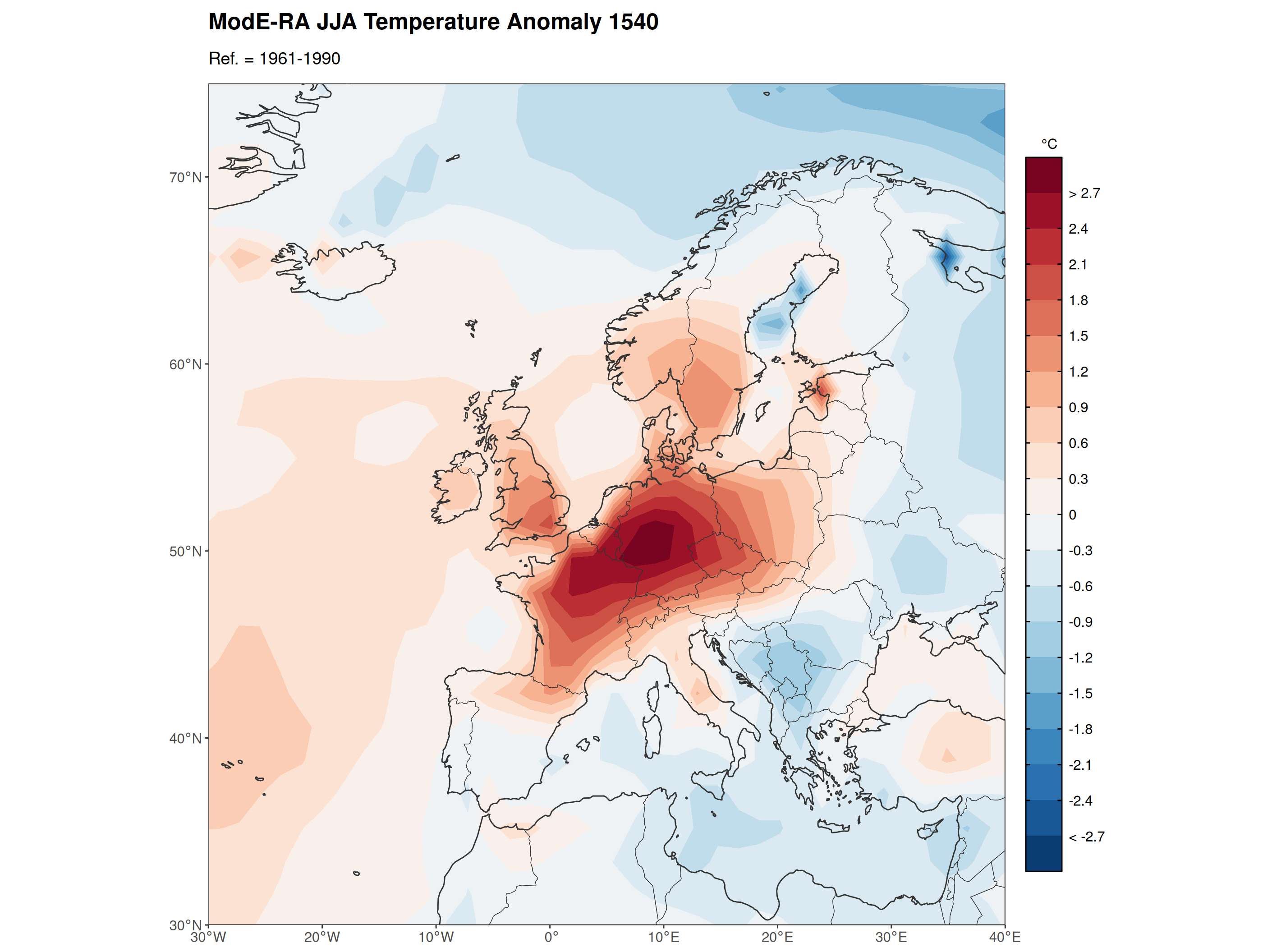
Temperature anomaly Summer 1540

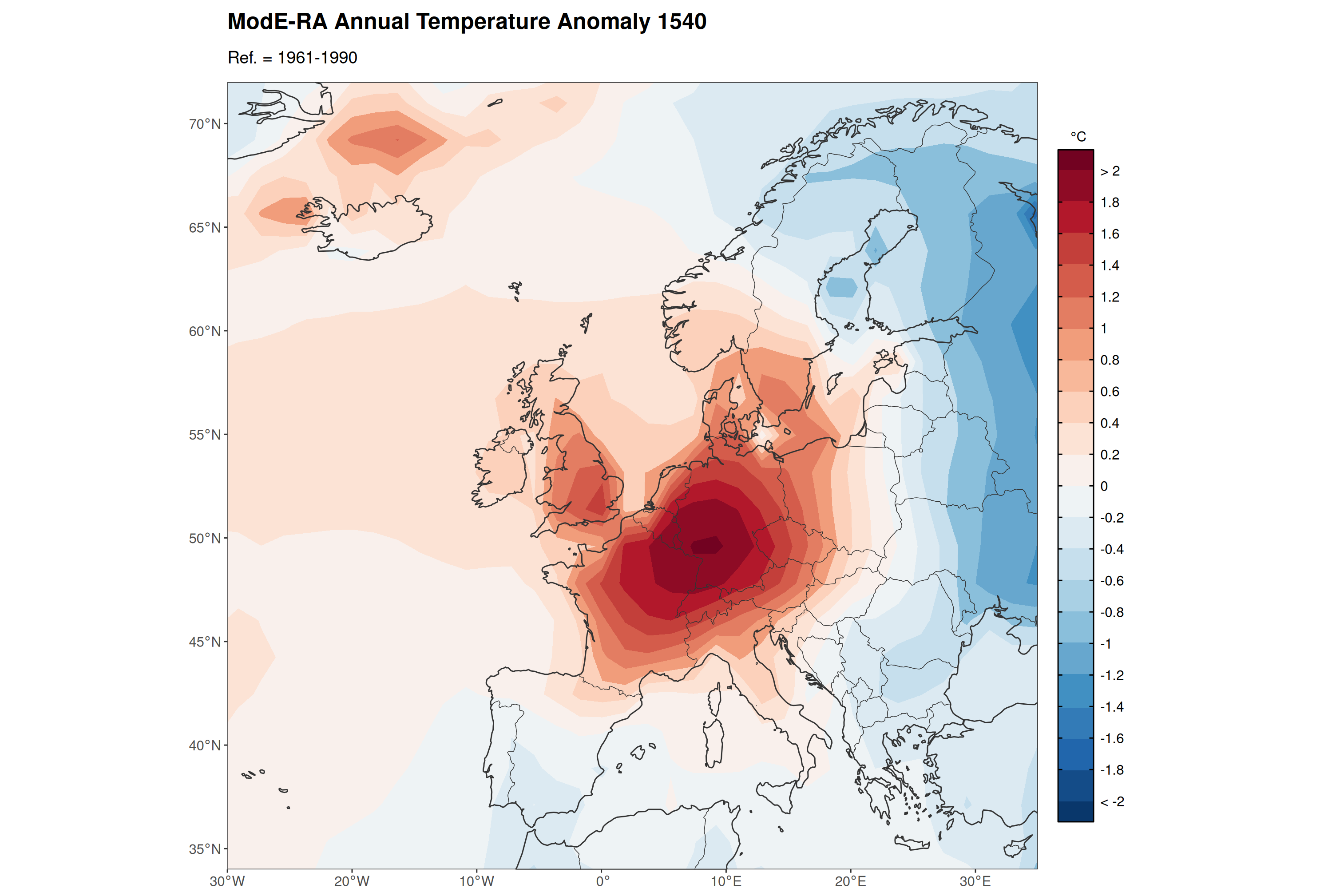
Annual temperature anomaly 1540

At the beginning of September, the cherry trees blossomed for a second time in Alsace, and in October the vines flowered again in Lindau on Lake Constance, where cherries reached ripeness for a second harvest. The warm weather continued until the end of the year. Around Christmas (6 January according to the Gregorian calendar), some gown-ups swam across the Rhine at Schaffhausen, which suggests that the water-temperature was still unusually high due to prolonged high temperatures and record-low water levels. The winter was also warm in Poland

The estimated annual temperatures, the highest between 1500 and 1999, were 2.4 °C (± 0.39 °C) higher in 1540 than in 1961–1990. Statistically speaking, the summer 1540 was an outlier, as the following four years were cold. Isolated hot summers were relatively common during the Little Ice Age (in Central Europe between 1350 and 1900) largely as a result of repeated severe soil drying in hot, dry springs before 1720. In contrast, they were rare between 1720 and 1987.

Long-term annual temperature trends and anomalies in Central Europe from 1500 to 1999. Deviations from the mean 1961-1990 (°C). Standard error prior to 1760 +/- 0.37 °C) Pfister, Wanner 2021. Data:

=== The endless meteorological drought ===
The estimated number of days with precipitation in the Swiss Plateau was 81% below the 20th century average. The model-estimated precipitation amounts in spring, summer, and autumn were significantly lower than 20th century minimums. Assuming average winter conditions, annual precipitation was around a quarter of the 20^(th) century average. The figure for Krakow, 900 km away, is in the same range. An event of this severity cannot be simulated using climate models.

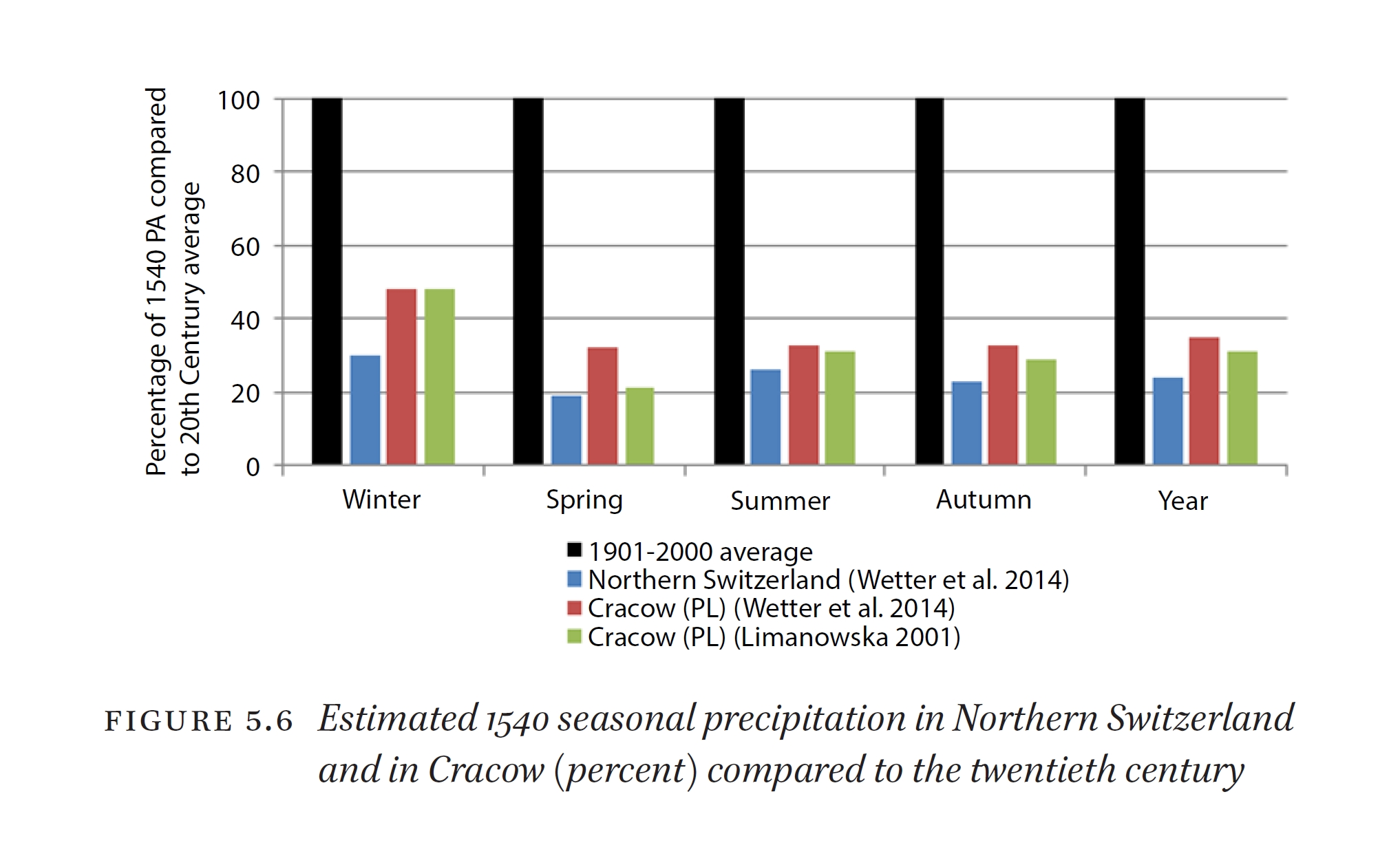
Estimated seasonal and annual precipitation in the Swiss Plateau and Krakow, Poland, in 1540. The figures are given as a percentage of the average for the period 1901–2000.

=== The disastrous hydrological drought ===
The year 1540 marked the peak of a European drought period from 1531 to 1540, which was probably unique in the last 500 years. Most springs, brooks and small rivers dried up completely. Digging for water more than 1.5 metres deep in the dried-out bed of the small Suhre river in Canon Lucerne, Switzerland, did not yield a drop. In the Swiss village of Goldiwil, "desperate people went over 500 m [1,600 ft] up and down in elevation every day, only to fill a few barrels of water in Lake Thun". Foot-wide cracks gaped up in the ground. Medium-sized rivers, such as the Meuse, which is a major European river with an average discharge of 325 m^{3}/s became almost stagnant. Near the Belgian city of Liège, cows sought refreshment in the warm water of the river. Based on detailed descriptions, the autumn discharge of large rivers such as the Rhine in Basel and Cologne, and the Elbe in Meissen, was estimated at 10% of the average discharge volumes from May to October. Unlike in 2003, no thunderstorm was observed in Switzerland during the summer of 1540.

Large quantities of fish (mostly grayling) were caught by hand in the Swiss Plateau in July. The extremely low water levels combined with extremely high water-temperatures and the complete drying up of smaller watercourses are likely to have severely decimated fish stocks in Europe. Large swarms of migratory locusts plagued Europe in the following years.

The water of the Moselle and Oder rivers was contaminated with toxic green algae (algal bloom). Many deciduous trees shed their leaves. In autumn it was still possible to wade or ride through these still meandering rivers in some places. Lake Constance fell to its lowest ever recorded level in the summer and autumn months. Roman coins were found on the dry lakebed near the coast. At that time, it was possible to wade through large still meandering rivers on horseback or on foot in some places. At the end of 1540, the Upper Rhine had fallen to its lowest level ever recorded. This was evidenced by a low water mark. Most Alpine glaciers still extended into the valleys in the early sixteenth century. In 1540 they likely lost a substantial part of their ice mass

=== Socio-economic and health impacts ===
Heat and drought particularly affected three branches of the economy: agriculture, transportation and energy production. The winter grain harvest, the main food crop, was satisfactory in Central Europe because yields and water requirements were lower than today but in Northern and Central Italy where drought already began in autumn 1539 the crop failed. This led to severe famine and widespread migration. Spring grains, fruit, legumes and the hay harvest failed completely north of the Alps. Watering cattle and small livestock became critical. Cattle were driven to water from sources up to ten kilometres away. All over Europe they died of thirst and heatstroke, as chroniclers from England, Alsace (France), Cologne (Germany) and northern Italy reported. Many others were probably slaughtered. Consequently, prices for milk and dairy products surged. Drawing on English manorial accounts, historian Kathleen Pribyl describes the disruptive effect of severe drought on medieval livestock management. Actual water shortage became a danger for cattle. In particular cows with calves were in need of high amounts of water to maintain milk production. Cattle were driven to water from sources up to ten kilometers to the nearest water source. For summer 1540 it is reported that much cattle in England died due to a shortage of water, perhaps also from consuming poisonous weeds, when no grass was left. The restraint of feed and water led to a collapse of milk production in dairy cattle herds in July and August and to a surge of prices, which is also described in many sources. It took months to recover even with the return of rain. These impacts would impair the diet of the poor by reducing their access to protein and fat.

Likewise, the transportation sector was affected. Prior to the creation of railway networks, waterways were the backbone of the transport system. For example, pre-industrial river transport accounted for 90% of goods transported on the Middle Rhine before the early 19th century. Higher priced goods made up the lion's share of the upstream cargo, while bulky goods dominated the downstream cargo. River navigation on the Middle Rhine was impossible during 'extreme low flows which were, however above those described in 1540. The situation for river navigation was not much better on the Upper Rhine. Small transport ships on the stretch of the Rhine between Lake Constance and Schaffhausen carried less than half of their usual cargo,

The main energy source collapsed with the ebbing of water. Trades such as hammermills became idle leaving the workers unemployed and dependent on begging. For pre-industrial societies, the worst effect of this situation was a standstill of mills except the ship mills within big rivers. Horse driven capstans were set up as a substitute in some places. In others, people resorted to the use of hand-mills. Surging prices for flour and bread and the lack of water resulted in life-threatening circumstances, especially for the poor.

The prolonged heat and drought led to a widespread epidemic called 'Big Death'. For England the records mention that hot agues, dysentery and plague were afflicting the English. “Hot agues” is a historical term used for acute, feverish illnesses. Dysentery is another cause for increased mortality levels in and after drought summers. It particularly affected young children after weaning. The various forms of transmission, via contaminated water and food or via flies, were all enhanced during dry and warm summers, when water levels were low- Most of the additional deaths would fall to late summer and autumn, since the impact of summer heat on mortality was delayed by 1–2 months. Following the extreme heat and drought of the summer of 1719, an epidemic of dysentery in France claimed 450,000 lives, equivalent to 2% of the population at the time. Assuming the same mortality rate in 1540 for an estimated population of 40 Million in Central Europe the 'Big Death' may have claimed about one million lives.

=== The arsonist scare ===
Forty-eight chroniclers report forest and settlement fires. Some of the forest fires could not be extinguished for months. Fires in German towns were more frequent in 1540 than in any other peaceful year since AD 1000, according to a unique statistic of 8,200 events compiled by Cornel Zwierlein. In many cases, it was probably because there was a lack of water to extinguish the fire. There are records of 32 additional city fires in German territory for the year 1540. The fires occurred during a time of political and religious conflicts surrounding the Reformation. In many cases, arson was suspected as the cause of the conflagrations, allegedly motivated by anti-Protestant sentiments. Vagabonds and beggars were often scapegoated, leading to a genuine paranoia regarding arsonists. The year 1540 also became known as the "Mordbrenner-Jahr" (year of arsonists). Numerous villages also burned down. Large parts of the continent were covered by forest and settlement fires, as evidenced by smoke plumes stretching from the Swiss Plateau to Krakow, among other places. Some chroniclers attributed the outbreak of wildfires to extreme heat and drought. Others blamed the fires on arsonists. According to the corresponding conspiracy theory, arsonists were marginalised men who were accused of setting fires on behalf of representatives of the enemy territory in exchange for payment. In religiously charged Germany, Protestants or Catholics were targeted as the alleged instigators by their opponents. Suspects were arrested, tortured and expelled from the country. In contrast to witches, who were accused of consorting with the devil, arson was considered a typically male crime. At the height of a heatwave on 26 July (Julian Calendar) which corresponds to 4 August 1540 (Gregorian calendar) the Protestant town of Einbeck burned down in a fire that became known as the Einbeck town fire. In his own 1541 defence addressed to Emperor Charles V, Duke Heinrich der Jüngere of Brunswick-Wolfenbüttel – the Catholic prince the Protestants accused of orchestrating the arson – pointed out that fires had also broken out in Catholic-held territory, including the diocese of Mainz, Magdeburg, Halberstadt, and his own lands, arguing this told against a one-sidedly anti-Protestant plot.

=== The grape harvest 1540 ===
At the beginning of August, the grapes were ripe in many vineyards, but the berries had dried up, so that vine-growers waited until September for more rain before harvesting. The delayed harvest produced a large quantity of inexpensive, honey-sweet wine, which tempted even the less wealthy to excessive alcohol consumption. In Limoges, the church capitular Pierre de Teysseulh noted that "the grapes were like roasted"; the resulting sweet, late-harvested vintage yielded a sherry-like wine that made people rapidly drunk. At Lake Constance, well water became more expensive than wine. Contemporary chronicler Hermann von Weinsberg wrote in his autobiographical diary that many people in Cologne lay 'like pigs' in the gutters and behind hedges, dead drunk. From the city of Münden there is a description of how in the year 1540 the ducal wine from the vineyard at Questenberg was "so excellent" that it was preferred to foreign wine. In Würzburg, the so-called 'Kaiserwein' (emperor's wine) became one of the best of the past millennium, probably comparable to today's dried berry selection. The last bottle of this rarity is viewed in the Würzburg Bürgerspital zum Heiligen Geist as part of guided tours.

== City fires ==
In the year 1540, there was an unusually high number of city fires, surpassed only during the height of the Thirty Years' War, in a year without major war damages. In Einbeck, the Krummes Wasser, a small river flowing through the city, was likely dried up. On "Annentag" (the day of Saint Anne), Julian calendar July 26, Gregorian calendar Aug 4th) a fire broke out, and the entire city was destroyed in the Einbeck city fire, with between 100 and 500 people dying. There are records of 32 additional city fires in German territory for the year 1540. The fires occurred during a time of political and religious conflicts surrounding the Reformation. In many cases, arson was suspected as the cause of the conflagrations, allegedly motivated by anti-Protestant sentiments. Vagabonds and beggars were often scapegoated, leading to a genuine paranoia regarding arsonists. The year 1540 also became known as the "Mordbrenner-Jahr" (year of arsonists).

== See also ==
- 1473 heat and drought in Europe
- 2022 European drought
- List of town and city fires
