= List of floods in Europe =

This is a list of notable recorded floods that have occurred in Europe.

Year	Details	Countries	Fatalities	Causes
120 BCE	Cymbrian flood	Denmark, Norway	probably many thousands	Storm tide
589	Breach at Cucca	Italy		
1170	All Saints' Flood (1170)	Netherlands	probably many thousands	Storm surge
1287	South England flood of February 1287	England	probably many thousands	Storm surge
1287	St. Lucia's flood	Netherlands, Northern Germany, England	50,000–80,000	Storm surge
1304	All Saints' Flood (1304)	Germany	271	Storm surge
1342	St. Mary Magdalene's flood	Germany, Austria, Italy	6,000	heavy rain
1362	(1st) Grote Mandrenke	England, the Netherlands, northern Germany, and Schleswig	>25,000	Storm surge
1404	St. Elizabeth's flood (1404)	Netherlands		Storm surge
1421	St. Elizabeth's flood (1421)	Netherlands	2,000-10,000	Storm surge
1436	All Saints Day Flood of 1436	Germany	>180	Storm surge
1530	St. Felix's Flood	Netherlands	many thousands	Storm surge
1570	All Saints' Flood (1570)	Netherlands	>20,000	Storm surge
1609	Bristol Channel floods, 1607	England	3,000	disputed - possible tsunami
1634	Burchardi Flood	Germany	8,000–15,000	Storm surge
1651	St. Peter's Flood	Netherlands, Northern Germany	15,000	Storm surge
1703	Great Storm of 1703	United Kingdom, Belgium, Netherlands, Germany	8,000–15,000	Storm surge
1717	Christmas flood of 1717	Netherlands, Germany, Denmark, Norway	14,000	Storm surge
1738	Holmfirth Floods (1738)	England	0	Heavy rain
1777	Holmfirth Floods (1777)	England	3	Heavy rain
1789	Storofsen	Norway, Denmark	63	heavy rains and snowmelting
1821	Holmfirth Floods (1821)	England	0	Heavy rain
1824	Saint Petersburg (1824)	Russia	10,000	Flood
1825	February flood of 1825	Germany, Netherlands	800	Storm surge
1829	Muckle Spate (1829)	Scotland		Heavy rain
1852	Holmfirth Floods#1852	England	81	Heavy rain
1859	Grenoble flood 1859	France		Rain + meltwater
1864	Great Sheffield Flood	United Kingdom	270	failure of the Dale Dike Reservoir
1865	1865 flooding of Bucharest	Romania	Unknown	Heavy rain
1872	1872 Baltic Sea flood	Denmark, Germany, Norway	271	Storm surge
1878	Flood in Miskolc, 1878	Hungary	400	Heavy rain
1879	Segura flood	Spain	?	?
1892	Mont Blanc glacier flood	France	175	subterranean glacial lake burst
1899	Oathbreaker's flood	Finland	0	heavy rain, snowy winter and warm spring
1910	1910 Great Flood of Paris	France	0	heavy rain and meltwater
1910	1910 European Floods	Austria, Belgium, Germany, Hungary, Serbia, Switzerland	1,200	Heavy rain
1928	1928 Thames flood	United Kingdom (England)	14	meltwater + heavy rain + storm surge
1934	1934 flood in Poland	Poland	55	heavy rain
1944	Holmfirth Floods#1944	United Kingdom (England)	3	Heavy rain
1947	1947 Thames flood	United Kingdom (England), Spain, Germany, Poland, Czechoslovakia		meltwater + heavy rain
1952	Lynmouth Flood	United Kingdom	34	heavy rain
1953	North Sea Flood of 1953	Netherlands, United Kingdom	2,551	Storm surge
1957	1957 Valencia flood	Spain	81	heavy rains and Turia flood
1959	Malpasset Dam	France	423	Dam failure
1962	North Sea flood of 1962	Netherlands, United Kingdom and Germany	318	Storm surge
1962	1962 Vallés floods	Spain	700	Heavy rain
1963	Vajont disaster	Italy	1,917	a landslide caused a seiche wave and a megatsunami
1963	Guadalquivir flood in Cordoba and Sevilla	Spain	?	
1964	1964 Zagreb flood	Yugoslavia	17	Heavy rain
1965	Danube floods in 1965	Germany, Austria, Czechoslovakia, Hungary, Yugoslavia	10	heavy rains, Alps snowmelting and dike failure at Číčov
1966	1966 Flood of the Arno River	Italy	35	heavy rains and snowmelting
1967	1967 Portugal floods	Portugal	The official death toll was 495 deaths. Unofficial estimates are of at least 700 deaths.	heavy rains
1968	Great Flood of 1968	United Kingdom, France	0	heavy rains and thunderstorms
1970	1970 floods in Romania	Romania	209	heavy rains and snowmelting
1976	Gale of January 1976	Ireland, Netherlands, United Kingdom, Denmark, Norway, Germany	82	Storm surge
1978	1978 North Sea storm surge	United Kingdom (England)	1	Storm surge
1981	December 1981 windstorm	United Kingdom (England, Wales), France		Storm surge + meltwater
1985	Val di Stava dam collapse	Italy	268	the reservoir breached its dam.
1987	Valtellina disaster	Italy	53	heavy rain
1994	Piedmont flood	Italy	77	heavy rain for three days lead to extreme discharge of tributaries of Po river
1997	1997 Central European flood	Czech Republic, Poland, Germany	114	extensive rain periods
1997	1997 Badajoz Flash Flood	Spain	25	heavy rain
1998	Jarovnice flood	Slovakia	63	heavy rainfall plus collapse of dam formed by debris
1999	1999 Pentecost flood	Austria, Germany		heavy rainfall plus Alpine meltwater
1999	1999 Blayais Nuclear Power Plant flood	France	0	Storm tide
2000	Autumn 2000 western Europe floods	United Kingdom, Italy, France, Switzerland, Spain, Netherlands, Ireland, Denmark, Norway, Slovenia	20	heavy rains
2002	2002 European floods	Czech Republic, Austria, Germany, Slovakia, Poland, Hungary, Romania, Croatia	232	heavy rains
2002	2002 Glasgow floods	United Kingdom	0	heavy rains
2004	Boscastle flood of 2004	United Kingdom	0	heavy rains
2005	2005 European floods	Romania, Switzerland, Austria and Germany		Record rain
2006	2006 European floods	Bulgaria, Romania, Serbia, Macedonia, Germany, Czech Republic, Hungary	0	poorly constructed dikes and levees and an unusual long and hard winter
2007	North Sea flood of 2007	Belgium, Denmark, Germany, Netherlands, Norway and United Kingdom	0	storm tide
2007	2007 United Kingdom floods	United Kingdom	13	heavy rain
2008	2008 Western Ukraine floods	Western Ukraine	30	Heavy rain
2008	2008 Irish flash floods	Ireland	1	Heavy rain
2008	2008 Morpeth floods	United Kingdom	0	heavy rain
2009	2009 Great Britain and Ireland floods	United Kingdom, Republic of Ireland	4	heavy rains
2009	2009 European floods	Austria, Czech Republic, Hungary, Poland, Romania, Slovakia, Turkey	33	heavy rains
2009	2009 Workington floods	United Kingdom	1	heavy rain
2009	2009 Messina floods and mudslides	Italy	31	Heavy rain
2009	2009 Turkish flash floods	Turkey	31	Heavy rain
2010	2010 Central European floods	Poland, Hungary, Czechia, Slovakia, Serbia, Ukraine, Austria	37	Heavy rain
2010	2010 Slovenia floods	Slovenia	3	Heavy rain
2010	2010 Var floods	France	25	Heavy rain
2010	2010 Albania floods	Albania	0	Heavy rain
2011	2011 European floods	Ireland, Italy, France	17	Heavy rain
2011	Cyclone Berit	United Kingdom (England)	4	Storm surge
2012	2012 Russian floods	Russia	171	Heavy rain
2012	2012 Great Britain and Ireland floods	United Kingdom, Ireland	9	Heavy rain
2012	2012 Romanian floods	Romania	5	Heavy rain
2013	2013 European floods	Germany, Czech Republic, Austria, Switzerland, Slovakia, Belarus, Poland, Hungary	25	Heavy rain
2013	2013 floods in Rhodes, Greece	Greece	3	Heavy rain
2014	2014 Southeast Europe floods	Bosnia and Herzegovina, Croatia, Serbia, Romania	86	Heavy rain
2014	2014 Bulgarian floods	Bulgaria	16	Heavy rain
2016	2016 European floods	Austria, Belgium, France, Germany, Moldova, Romania	21	Heavy rain
2016	2016 Macedonian floods	Republic of Macedonia	21	Heavy rain
2016	2016 Italian flood	Northwestern Italy	1	Heavy rain
2017	2017 West Attica floods	Greece	24	Heavy rain
2018	2018 European floods	Spain, France, Italy	69	Heavy rain
2019	2019 Yorkshire Dales flooding	United Kingdom	0	Heavy rain
2019	2019–2020 United Kingdom floods	United Kingdom	11	Heavy rain
2020	2020 floods in Evia, Greece	Greece	8	Heavy rain
2020	Storm Gloria	Spain, France	14	Heavy rain, storm surge
2020	Storm Dennis	United Kingdom	7	Heavy rain
2020	2020 Western Ukraine floods	Ukraine	4	Heavy rain
2021	2021 Evros floods	Greece, Turkey	1	Heavy rain
2021	2021 European floods	Austria, Belgium, Czech Republic, Croatia, France, Germany, Italy, Luxembourg, Netherlands, Romania, Switzerland, United Kingdom	243	Heavy rain
2021	2021 Turkish floods	Turkey	97	Heavy rain
2021	2021 floods in Bosnia and Herzegovina	Bosnia and Herzegovina	0	Heavy rain
2023	2023 Emilia-Romagna floods	Italy (Emilia-Romagna)	17	Heavy rains caused by Storm Minerva
2023	Destruction of the Kakhovka Dam	Ukraine (Kherson Oblast)	200+	Destruction of a dam during the Russian invasion of Ukraine
2023	2023 Carinthia and Slovenia floods	Slovenia	7	Heavy rains
2023	2023 Danube floods	Hungary	12	Heavy rains
2024	2024 Germany floods	Germany	9	Heavy rains
2024	2024 Central European floods	Czech Republic, Poland, Austria, Slovakia, Germany, Hungary and Romania	27	Heavy rains
2024	2024 floods in Bosnia and Herzegovina	Bosnia and Herzegovina	27	Heavy rain
2024	2024 floods in Spain	Spain	242	Heavy rain
2025	2025 Odesa floods	Ukraine (Odesa)	10	Heavy rain

== See also ==
- Drought
- Floods Directive
- List of floods
- 2021 European floods
- List of flash floods
- Storm tides of the North Sea
