= 2018 European floods =

Natural disaster in Europe

- Date: October–November 2018
- Location: Spain; France; Italy; United Kingdom; Portugal
- Deaths: 69
- Property damage: €200 million (France)

From 4 October 2018 to early November, heavy floods affected Europe. The floods started in the Italian region of Calabria. Then, on 9 October, the island of Mallorca, Spain was struck by floods and in the next days some cities in Southwest France, the region of Sardinia, Italy and some parts of Portugal and the United Kingdom were also struck by flash floods. At the end of the month, Italy was struck again by heavy floods and strong winds. A total of 69 people were killed: 36 in Italy, 16 in France, 13 in Spain, 2 in the United Kingdom and 2 in Portugal.

== Flooded countries ==
Countries	Deaths	Details
Italy	36	On 4 October, the region of Calabria was struck by floods. A woman and her two children died when their car crashed. A bridge collapsed and roads were also damaged. Later, on 10 October, in the city of Cagliari, Sardinia a woman died when her car was swept away. Her husband and their three children were rescued alive. Another man is currently missing in the city. At the end of October and the beginning of November, heavy floods affected the entire country, killing 32 people, thirteen of whom in the region of Sicily. Several others were injured. Venice flooded due to an exceptionally high tide of 156 cm (5.12 feet) (the 4th highest acqua alta since 1923), leaving 70% of the city underwater. The Dolomites mountain range, an UNESCO World Heritage Site, and most of the mountainous region in the North-Eastern Italy (for example at the Asiago plateau) suffered many landslides and flooding due to heavy rain, with extensive communication and basic services disruption, and a great percentage of its woods was levelled by hurricane-force winds up to 190 km/h (120 mph; 100 kn) during the late afternoon of 29 October.
France	16	France was also struck by the floods, causing damage. Two people died when their vehicle was swept away by floodwater in Sainte-Maxime on 10 October. On 15 October, at least 14 people died after floods affected the Aude region. A bridge also collapse in the locality of Villegailhenc, while all roads were inaccessible in Carcassonne. Damage in the region were about €200 million.
Spain	13	On 9 October, Mallorca was severely struck, leaving 12 dead, including six foreign tourists: three from Germany, two from the United Kingdom and one from the Netherlands. Spanish Prime Minister Pedro Sánchez has said it will take months to return the disaster-hit towns to normality. More than 300 rescue workers were active, including 200 that were searching for a missing boy, that was found dead days later, bringing the final death toll to 13. On 11 October, Rafael Nadal opened his tennis academy centre to the flood victims.
United Kingdom	2	On 13 October, two people died in United Kingdom: the first victim was a man who died in a landslide in Wales, the second victim was a man who died after entering the sea in Brighton.
Portugal	2	On 14 October, two men were found dead during the storms in Portugal, one near a church. Twenty-eight others were injured.

== See also ==
- Hurricane Leslie (2018)
- Autumn 2000 western Europe floods
- 2007 United Kingdom floods
- 2009 European floods
- 2009 Messina floods and mudslides
- 2009 Turkish flash floods
- 2010 Central European floods
- 2010 Var floods
- 2011 European floods
- 2012 Krasnodar Krai floods
- 2013 European floods
- 2014 Southeast Europe floods
- 2014 Bulgarian floods
- 2016 European floods
- 2016 Macedonian floods
