= Lycastus (disambiguation) =

Lycastus is the name of some figures in Greek mythology.

Lycastus or Lykastos (Ancient Greek: Λύκαστος) may also refer to:

- Lycastus (Crete), a town of ancient Crete, Greece
- Lycastus (Pontus), a town of ancient Pontus, now in Turkey
- Lycastus (river), a river of ancient Pontus, now in Turkey
