= Chadisius (river) =

River in ancient Pontus

Coordinates: 41°16′00″N 36°33′00″E

The Chadisius or Chadisios (Ancient Greek: Χαδίσιος), or Chadisia (Χαδισία), was a river of ancient Pontus, near the mouth of which sat the town of Chadisia. Menippus, in his Periplus of the two Ponti, quoted by Stephanus of Byzantium, says: "from the Lycastus to the village and river Chadisius is 150 stadia, and from the Chadisius to the river Iris 100 stadia."

Modern scholars identify the Chadisius with the modern Abdal Dere or Abdal Çayı in Samsun Province, Asiatic Turkey.
