= Chadisia =

Town in ancient Pontus

Coordinates: 41°17′17″N 36°34′32″E

Chadisia (Ancient Greek: Χαδισία), also Chadisius or Chadisios (Χαδίσιος), was a town of ancient Pontus, not far from the coast on a river of the same name. Hecataeus, quoted by Stephanus of Byzantium, speaks of Chadisia as a city of the Leucosyri, that is, of the group the Persians called the Cappadocians; and he says, "the plain Themiscyra extends from Chadisia to the Thermodon." Menippus, in his Periplus of the two Ponti, also quoted by Stephanus, says: "from the Lycastus to the village and river Chadisius is 150 stadia, and from the Chadisius to the river Iris 100 stadia."

Its site is located near Karabahçe in Asiatic Turkey.
