= 2016 Macedonian floods =

- Date: 6-10 August 2016
- Location: Republic of Macedonia
- Deaths: 21+

In August 2016, several rainstorms hit the western and northwestern parts of the Republic of Macedonia. On 6 August, a storm with strong winds and flooding hit Skopje and the western parts of the country, leaving at least 21 people dead and dozens injured or missing.

== Events ==
In the afternoon of 6 August 2016 at 5:30 pm CEST, heavy rains began falling in the area of the country's capital Skopje, resulting in strong winds and floods. The rain was reported to have stopped around 9:30 am CEST the next day, with the peak of the storm in the middle of the night, around 3:30 am CEST. Macedonia's weather service reported that 93 litres per square metre (1.9 imp gal/sq ft) fell in two hours on Skopje, which is equivalent to the average for an entire month of August. The water level of some of the areas affected reached a height of 1.5 metres (4 ft 11 in), which was being combed by Macedonia's police and army for survivors and other victims. Meteorologists reported that more than 800 lightning strikes were recorded in the first two hours of the storm, which went on for about five hours in total. At least 21 people died, with dozens of others injured or missing. The local media reported that ambulances were called 65 times in the city area, while more than 20 people were treated and the army were called in to help. Three villages to the northeast of the city were cut off due to landslides.

== Reactions ==
The deputy prime minister Nikola Todorov called the storm a "catastrophe of unprecedented proportions". The Mayor of Skopje Koce Trajanovski said that the city never experienced such a disaster. The government declared a state of emergency and 8 August was declared a national day of mourning.

== See also ==
- 2014 Bulgarian floods, a similar localized and deadly event triggered by extreme rainfall
- 2014 Southeast Europe floods, which affected 10 countries, causing 86 deaths and at least 1 billion euros in damages
- 2016 European floods
- List of floods in Europe
