= Lycastus (Pontus) =

Lycastus or Lykastos (Ancient Greek: Λύκαστος), also known as Lycastum or Lykaston, was an ancient Greek city in ancient Pontus, on a river bearing the same name. It was situated 20 stadia southeast of Amisus. Pomponius Mela calls the town Lycasto. Pherecydes spoke of a town of Lycastia, inhabited by Amazons, and situated between Themiscyra and Chalybia. The river Lycastus was but a small stream, which after a short course emptied itself into the Euxine close by the town of Lycastus.

The Lycastrus River is identified with the modern Mert River, in Samsun Province, Turkey, but the townsite is treated as unlocated, but likely along that river.
