= 2020 Western Ukraine floods =

Natural disaster in Ukraine

2020 Western Ukraine Floods
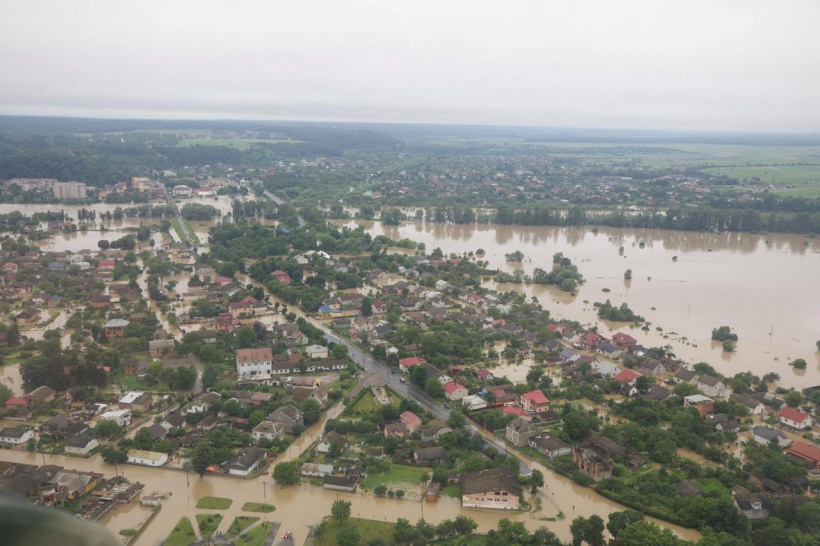
- Consequences of the flood in the city of Halych
- Date: 23 June 2020–15 July 2020
- Location: Western Ukraine
- Cause: Heavy Rains
- Deaths: 4
- Property damage: $345 million

The 2020 Western Ukraine Floods was a natural disaster that caused a significant increase in the water level of the rivers of the western regions of Ukraine, in particular, the Dniester, Prut, Cheremosh, and Bystrytsia rivers, which occurred on the 20th of June 2020 as a result of intense thunderstorm rains.

The peak of the flood fell on June 23–27, and it is considered the largest in the history of Western Ukraine over the past 60 years. The total damage from the flood was estimated at $345 million.

== Weather events and impact ==
Intense rainfall during June 22–24 led to the complication of the flood situation in Ivano-Frankivsk, Chernivtsi, Lviv, Zakarpattia and Ternopil regions.

On June 23, more than 50 settlements were flooded in Zakarpattia due to bad weather.

On Tuesday, June 23, due to worsening weather conditions, a "red" level of danger was declared in Prykarpattia and Bukovina. As a result of heavy downpours, mountain rivers in the Carpathians damaged local roads.

In the Ivano-Frankivsk region, the Dniester river flooded the city of Halych, in particular, the district hospital in the city, where patients with coronavirus infection are treated. According to Vitaly Fedoriv, the head of the Regional State Administration, the peak of bad weather will occur on June 24. Due to the flood, a road collapse occurred in Yaremchi, which destroyed the main water pipeline, as a result of which the city was left without water supply.

In the Chernivtsi region, the Cheremosh River broke through two dams and cut off the entrances to several villages on its banks. An increase in the water level was also recorded on the Prut and its tributaries.

Near the village In the Ustya-Zeleny Monastyris district in Ternopil Oblast, the Dniester overflowed the dam, as a result of which local residents were partially resettled, agricultural lands were flooded, and there is a threat of Koropets, Ustya-Zeleny and Luka being flooded.

As of June 25, the following were flooded:

- 285 settlements (Ivano-Frankivsk — 234, Chernivtsi — 37, Lviv — 12, Ternopil — 2);
- 9,994 houses (Ivano-Frankivsk — 9,157, Chernivtsi — 728, Lviv — 72, Ternopil — 37);
- 9 social and household objects;
- 117 km of highways were destroyed (Ivano-Frankivsk — 116, Chernivtsi — 1), 64 bridges in the Ivano-Frankivsk region,
- 500 km of highways and 135 bridges were damaged (Ivano-Frankivsk — 487 km of roads and 118 bridges, Lviv — 2 km of highways, Chernivtsi — 12 km of roads and 17 bridges) and 280 m of dams in the Chernivtsi region [1 ] .

The head of the Chernivtsi Regional State Administration Serhii Osachuk noted that the water level in the Prut River has started to decrease in recent hours, in particular, at 7:00 p.m. on June 24, the water level in the Prut near Chernivtsi reached 6.56 m, and at 1:00 a.m. on June 25, it reached 5.89 m.

As of June 25, a total of 110 km of highways were destroyed in Ivano-Frankivsk region as a result of bad weather, and 427.5 km were damaged, 90 bridges were destroyed, 130 were damaged, 285 people were displaced, and 1,850 meters of coastal fortifications were destroyed.

As of June 26, at least 2 people died in Ivano-Frankivsk region.

The Prime Minister of Ukraine, Denys Shmyhal, said that the flooding exceeded the scale of 2008 [3] . At the peak of the flood, 14,500 houses were flooded, as of June 27, 4,500 houses were flooded, and 8 settlements in the Ivano-Frankivsk region were also cut off. In general, according to the prime minister, at least 250 settlements in five regions were affected, the Ivano-Frankivsk region was the most affected.

On June 28, 20 days' worth of rain fell in two hours after lunch in Mizhhirsky district. In the villages, the flow of water and the landslide destroyed the road and damaged the houses.

As of June 29, 70 settlements in Ivano-Frankivsk, Chernivtsi, Lviv, and Ternopil regions were flooded, the flood destroyed 150.5 km of highways, 83 bridges and damaged 582 km of highways and 220 bridges. In the Ivano-Frankivsk region, rescuers completed the search for the driver of the car that fell into the White Cheremosh River during the flood. The man's body was found in a nearby area by local residents.

As of June 30, as a result of worsening weather conditions (rain, gusts of wind) due to the operation of power transmission line protection systems, power was cut off in 35 settlements in two oblasts: 31 in Zakarpattia, 4 in Volyn. In the western oblasts (Ivano-Frankivsk, Chernivtsi, Lviv and Ternopilsk) works are ongoing to eliminate the consequences of the flood.

On July 2, it became known that the floodplains along the lower Dniester were filled with water, the water level reached dangerous levels and continued to rise. In the low sections of the Odesa-Reni highway, the water rose to the road surface.

As of July 7, 5 settlements in the Chernivtsi region remain flooded.

As of July 9, four people became victims of floods in the Ivano-Frankivsk region.

On July 15, the flooding of residential premises was eliminated, more than 750 km of roads and almost 300 bridges remained damaged.

== Reasons ==
- Oksana Maryskevich, a leading researcher at the Carpathian Ecology Institute of the National Academy of Sciences: "The forest is one of the factors of the flood, but not the main one. No one could have canceled the flood, but its consequences could have been much smaller. The rampant clogging of rivers also had an effect, which is the fault of both local residents and the local authorities, because not all mountain villages have established collection of household waste. Undoubtedly, deforestation also has an effect. If there is a natural virgin forest, then the scale of washing, water erosion, is an order of magnitude lower" [21] .
- Yuriy Debryniuk, professor of the Department of Forest Crops and Forest Selection of the National Forestry University: "Current floods are not related to deforestation. Forests have always been cut down and much more than now. Today, the volumes of logging are smaller than they were before - I worked in the Carpathians in the 1980s, and then the volumes of logging were much larger."
- Weather forecasters call heavy prolonged rains the cause of the flood.

== Reaction to events ==
=== Local ===
In the city of Halych, Ivano-Frankivsk region, a scandal broke out due to the unfair distribution of monetary compensation, which was previously aimed at overcoming the consequences of large-scale floods in the region.

Damaged houses were divided into three categories:

- For completely destroyed - 300,000 hryvnias.
- For buildings in need of major repairs — 50,000 hryvnias.
- Partially destroyed houses - 20,000 hryvnias (most of the houses were assigned to this category).

=== International ===
- The Pope called to pray for the improvement of the fate of the peoples of the Middle East who are suffering from wars, "as well as those who were affected by heavy floods in Western Ukraine".
- European Union: To combat the consequences of the devastating flood, the European Union will provide assistance to Ukraine through the EU civil protection mechanism.
  - Italy: sent pumping equipment, personal protective equipment, gasoline saws, generators and tents for the victims to Ukraine by plane.
  - Sweden: has announced its intention to send anti-flood barriers, water pumping hoses and technical experts to Ukraine.
- The Embassy of Israel handed over 500,000 hryvnias and 25,000 one and a half liter bottles of drinking water. They will be delivered to Ivano-Frankivsk and Chernivtsi to eliminate the shortage of drinking water [27] .
- Slovakia handed over humanitarian aid for the settlements of the Ivano-Frankivsk region that were affected by the flood, namely: tents, pumps, generators and other rescue equipment.
