= 2014 Bulgarian floods =

June 2014 flood in Bulgaria and Romania

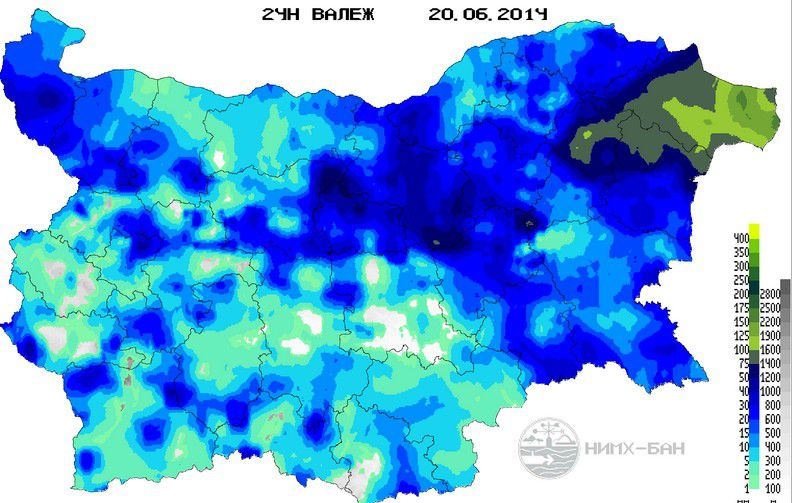
- 24-hour rainfall totals in Bulgaria for June 19, 2014
- Date: 17–20 June 2014 (3 days)
- Location: Bulgaria; Varna Province; Dobrich Province; Veliko Tarnovo Province; Shumen Province Romania; Constanța County
- Deaths: 16
- Property damage: 311,000,000+ Euros

On June 19, 2014, torrential rains caused severe flash flooding across northeastern Bulgaria leaving dozens of villages without electricity and submerging large parts of several cities in the region. At least 16 people were reported killed – 13 (4 of which children) in the Asparuhovo district of Varna, one in Dobrich and two in the village of Tsani Ganchevo in Shumen Province.

Abundant rainfall, the result of a Mediterranean cyclone, also caused damage on the Romanian shore of the Black Sea, especially in Constanța County.

== Meteorological history ==
In the days leading up to the event, large parts of the country had been battered by heavy rain and hailstorms. On June 18, the Varna office of the country's forecasting service (NIMH) sent an official memo to the local administration warning of intensive rain and hailstorms on the following day. According to the NIMH, the average 24-hour for Varna Province was between 60 and 85 L/m^{2}, while in neighboring Dobrich Province it was from 90 to 155 L/m^{2}. The average amount for the whole month of June is around 50-60 L/m^{2}. A single weather station in the north of Varna recorded values of 35 L/m^{2} in a two-hour period between 6pm and 8pm on June 19. In the far northeastern parts of Bulgaria, rainfall rates reached 140–200 mm/h. On June 20 the NIMH warned that further rains up to 20 L/m^{2} could be expected throughout the weekend.

According to data presented by the Inspectorate for Emergency Situations of Constanța County, the most affected areas in the county were Brebeni, wherein the amount of water was 92 L/m^{2}, Adamclisi – 80.2 L/m^{2}, Deleni – 60 L/m^{2}, Albești – 64 L/m^{2} and the municipality of Mangalia, with 31 L/m^{2}.

== Affected regions ==
=== Bulgaria ===
The worst-hit area was in Varna's low-lying district of Asparuhovo, where dozens of houses were swept away and streets were virtually unrecognizable due to piles of mangled cars and debris. At least 11 people were initially confirmed killed in Asparuhovo, with at least two others missing. Much of the area remained without electricity for more than 24 hours before official restored it in the afternoon of June 20. It was not immediately clear if most of the victims drowned inside houses or were swept away in their vehicles. On June 23 emergency services located the body of a 3-year-old girl in the ruins of a house in Asparuhovo, raising the death toll in Varna to 12. A six-year-old boy remained missing and was presumed dead. His body was discovered on June 26, bringing the final death toll from Asparuhovo up to 13.

A further three casualties were reported from the city of Dobrich, were water levels rose to almost 2 meters in some parts of the town. The mayor of the city Detelina Nikolova later announced that only one person had been confirmed dead, after 2 people initially thought missing were found to have escaped unharmed.

On June 20 the government declared a state of emergency in the provinces of Varna, Shumen, Dobrich, Veliko Tarnovo and Pazardzhik. The Pass of the Republic was closed after a 200-meter section of the road was swept away by rushing floodwaters. The Batova river burst its banks near the Black Sea resort of Albena, prompting the evacuation of six hotels. Roads leading out of Albena towards Varna and Balchik were damaged and temporarily closed.

=== Romania ===
In Constanța County, a popular summer destination for Romanians and foreigners, the authorities established red code of flooding. Wind gusts of 94 km/h caused significant damage in the summer resorts. Tens of kilometers of roads were flooded, disrupting traffic in the localities of Adamclisi, Abrud, Urluia and Zorile. Likewise, dozens of houses and 70 hectares of pasture were affected by floods.

In Constanța, the sewage system couldn't cope with the large amount of rain, boulevards and streets being covered by water. In Mamaia, the rain destroyed a cafe on the seafront.

== Response and aftermath ==
Bulgarian Prime Minister Plamen Oresharski travelled to Varna, where he called the disaster a "great tragedy". The government declared Monday, June 23, a day of national mourning. In a message to the Bulgarian President Rosen Plevneliev, the President of the European Commission José Manuel Barroso promised to mobilize all available instruments to help the country. According to EU legislation, for emergency funds to be activated a disaster needs to inflict damage of three billion Euros (by 2002 inflation rates) or more than 0.6% of the country's GDP. In the case of Bulgaria this means confirmed damages of at least 232,5 million Euros. On June 24, officials announced that preliminary damage estimates in Veliko Tarnovo Province alone were over 10 million leva (5,1 million Euros). Damage to the country's road infrastructure was estimated at around 15 million leva (7,7 million Euros), including about 1.5 million leva to reopen the Pass of the Republic. On June 27, Varna Province officials announced that damage to local infrastructure there was estimated to be at least 30 million leva (15.25 million Euros).

Starting from June 24, officials in Varna began evacuating around 250 Asparuhovo residents from 85 buildings deemed too dangerous to live in, including at least 11 that would be demolished immediately. Due to the extreme amount of precipitation, measures were taken to stabilize parts of the hillside in the area for fears it might collapse in a landslide. Water service was fully restored to Asparuhovo on June 25, although officials announced they will continue to monitor the chemical composition of water within the city of Varna for at least a few weeks. By June 27, the number of evacuation orders in Asparuhovo had risen to 132, covering more than 1,000 residents of the neighborhood.

On June 20 the organizers of Sofia Pride announced they would postpone the 7th edition of the event, scheduled for the day after, in solidarity with the victims of the floods. They also appealed to citizens to actively contribute to the ongoing relief effort. Dozens of fans of Levski (Sofia) and CSKA (Sofia) both urged supporters to donate via the text-messaging campaign and promised to organize help on the ground as well. On June 23 a spokesman for the Bulgarian Army announced that a total of 860 people had been rescued or evacuated by various units across the country.

Relatives of people killed in the floods were to receive an immediate one-time government package of 10,000 leva (~5,113 Euros). Within hours of the event, a donation campaign was set up through which citizens could contribute funds by sending text messages to a special numbers. By mid-afternoon on June 20 over 190,000 such texts had been sent, raising a few hundred thousand leva for victims of the floods. By June 24, a total of 832,948 Leva (~425,600 Euros) had been gathered as part of the relief efforts, with about 80% of those coming from text messages and the rest being donated via bank accounts. Authorities estimated the total numbers of families that would require long-term help at around 800, spread across Varna, Dobrich and Veliko Tarnovo provinces.

Several dozen Syrian refugees traveled from camps in the capital Sofia and Harmanli to Varna, answering a call by the local municipality for volunteers to help with the clean-up effort.

== See also ==
- 2013 European floods
- 2013 Sardinia floods
- 2014 Southeast Europe floods, killed 86 people in the Western Balkans a month earlier
- Flood control
- List of floods in Europe
