= European Union Solidarity Fund =

The European Union Solidarity Fund (EUSF) was founded in 2002. Its objective is to provide assistance to European Union member states when large-scale disasters occur. Catastrophes are considered to be large-scale if the estimated direct cost of damage exceeds 3 billion euros or 0.6% of gross national income of the country concerned. Since its inception, the Fund has provided assistance to member states as a result of 56 disasters including earthquakes, forest fires, drought, storms and floods. According to a European Commission report, Italy and Germany have been the leading beneficiaries of these emergency funds, though in total 23 states have received support.

== Scope and eligibility ==
The Solidarity Fund serves mainly to provide assistance in the event of a major natural disaster with serious repercussions for living conditions, the natural environment or the economy in one or more regions of a Member State or of a country applying for accession. A natural disaster is regarded as 'major' if: in the case of a State, it causes damage whose estimated cost is either in excess of EUR 3 billion (2002 prices) or more than 0.6% of the gross national income of the beneficiary State; exceptionally, in the case of a region (with particular attention paid to remote and isolated parts of the EU, such as outermost and island regions), it causes damage affecting a majority of the population, with serious and lasting repercussions for living conditions and economic stability, in which specific case the annual aid available may not exceed 7.5% of the annual amount allocated to the Solidarity Fund (i.e. EUR 75 million).

== Measures ==
Assistance from the Fund takes the form of a grant to supplement public spending by the beneficiary State and is intended to finance measures to alleviate damage which, in principle, is non-insurable. Urgent measures eligible for funding are: the immediate restoration to working order of infrastructure and plants providing energy, drinking water, waste water disposal, telecommunications, transport, health and education; the provision of temporary accommodation and the funding of rescue services, to meet the immediate needs of the population affected; the immediate consolidation of preventive infrastructure and protection of cultural heritage sites; the immediate cleaning-up of disaster-stricken areas, including natural areas.

== Submission of the application ==
The State affected must submit an application for assistance from the Solidarity Fund to the Commission no later than 12 weeks after the first effects of the disaster become clear. It must estimate the cost of the measures required and indicate any other sources of funding.

== Implementation ==
The procedure for allocating a grant, followed by a budgetary procedure, can take several months. Once the appropriations have been made available, the Commission concludes an agreement with the beneficiary State and makes a grant. The beneficiary State is responsible for using the grant and auditing the way it is spent. Emergency measures can be financed retrospectively to cover operations from the first day of the disaster. It is not possible to double-finance measures by defraying from the Solidarity Fund costs already covered by the Structural Funds, the Cohesion Fund, the European Agricultural Guidance and Guarantee Fund (EAGGF), the Instrument for Structural Policies for Pre-Accession (ISPA) or the Special Accession Programme for Agriculture and Rural Development (SAPARD).

== Use of the grant ==
The Solidarity Fund grant must be used within 18-month, starting from the date on which it was allocated. The beneficiary State must pay back any part of the grant that remains unused. Six months after the expiry of the one-year period, it must present an implementation report to the commission. This document must provide details of the expenditure eligible for support from the Solidarity Fund and of all other funding received, including insurance settlements and compensation from third parties.

== Annual report and checks by the Court of Auditors ==
The Commission presents an annual report on the activities of the Fund. In June 2008, the European Court of Auditors presented the results of a performance audit of the Fund, concluding that, while it had achieved its goal of demonstrating solidarity with Member States at times of disaster, the conditions governing the approval of applications were rather vague, especially for regional disasters. The Court was also critical of the slow pace of the allocation process. A special report of the Court of Auditors in 2012 dealt with the 2009 L’Aquila earthquake in the Abruzzo region of Italy. This was the most serious natural disaster that the Solidarity Fund has had to deal with since it was created. The assistance provided totalled over EUR 500 million. The report found that, with the exception of one particularly complex project (CASE), all financed projects complied with the regulation.

== Commission proposal presented in July 2013 to amend Regulation (EC) No 2012/2002 ==
In 2005 the Commission put forward proposals to broaden the Fund's scope of intervention and lower the intervention thresholds that trigger the release of funding. Since then, these proposals have been blocked by a majority of Member States. To unblock the situation, the Commission proposed, in its communication on the Future of the European Union Solidarity Fund of 6 October 2011, ways to improve the functioning of the Fund, but this did not lead to a reboot of the debate. On 25 July 2013, the Commission presented a new legislative proposal, including the following proposed modifications: speeding-up of payments; the introduction of possible advance payments (10% of anticipation, capped at EUR 30 million); a clearer definition of the scope for intervention through the Solidarity Fund, both in general terms and in the event of slowly unfolding disasters such as droughts; a new and simplified definition of 'regional disasters', introducing a damage threshold of 1.5% of GDP; a simplification of the administrative procedures by combining decisions on the award of grants with the implementation agreement. The proposal, negotiated under the ordinary legislative procedure, led to the entry into force of the amending Regulation (EU) No 661/2014 of 15 May 2014
