= 1865 flooding of Bucharest =

Natural disaster in Romania

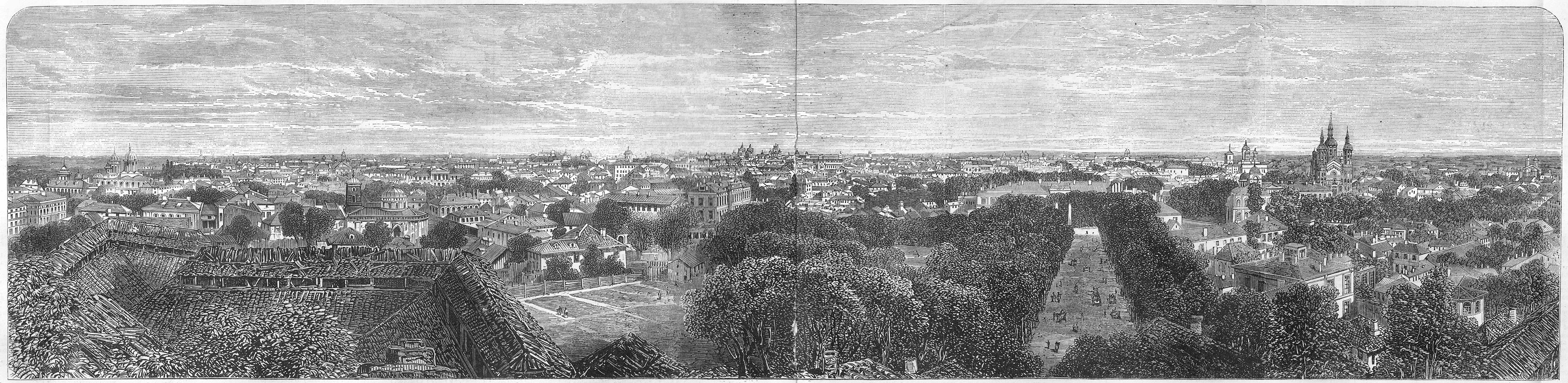
- Panorama of Bucharest after the flooding. The image was made by Carol Szathmari and published in The Illustrated London News, on 1 April 1865
- Date: 13–20 March 1865
- Location: Bucharest
- Deaths: Numerous
- Property damage: Huge

As a result of snowmelt, Bucharest, the capital of Romania, was hit by the worst flooding in its history. Although the death toll is unknown, documents attest a large number of dead and displaced people. At people's pressure, Prince Alexandru Ioan Cuza started a project of sewering the Dâmbovița River, which concretized only in 1880, after the plans of engineer Grigore Cerkez. Modern facilities were built to supply water to the city and 12 bridges.

== Flooding ==
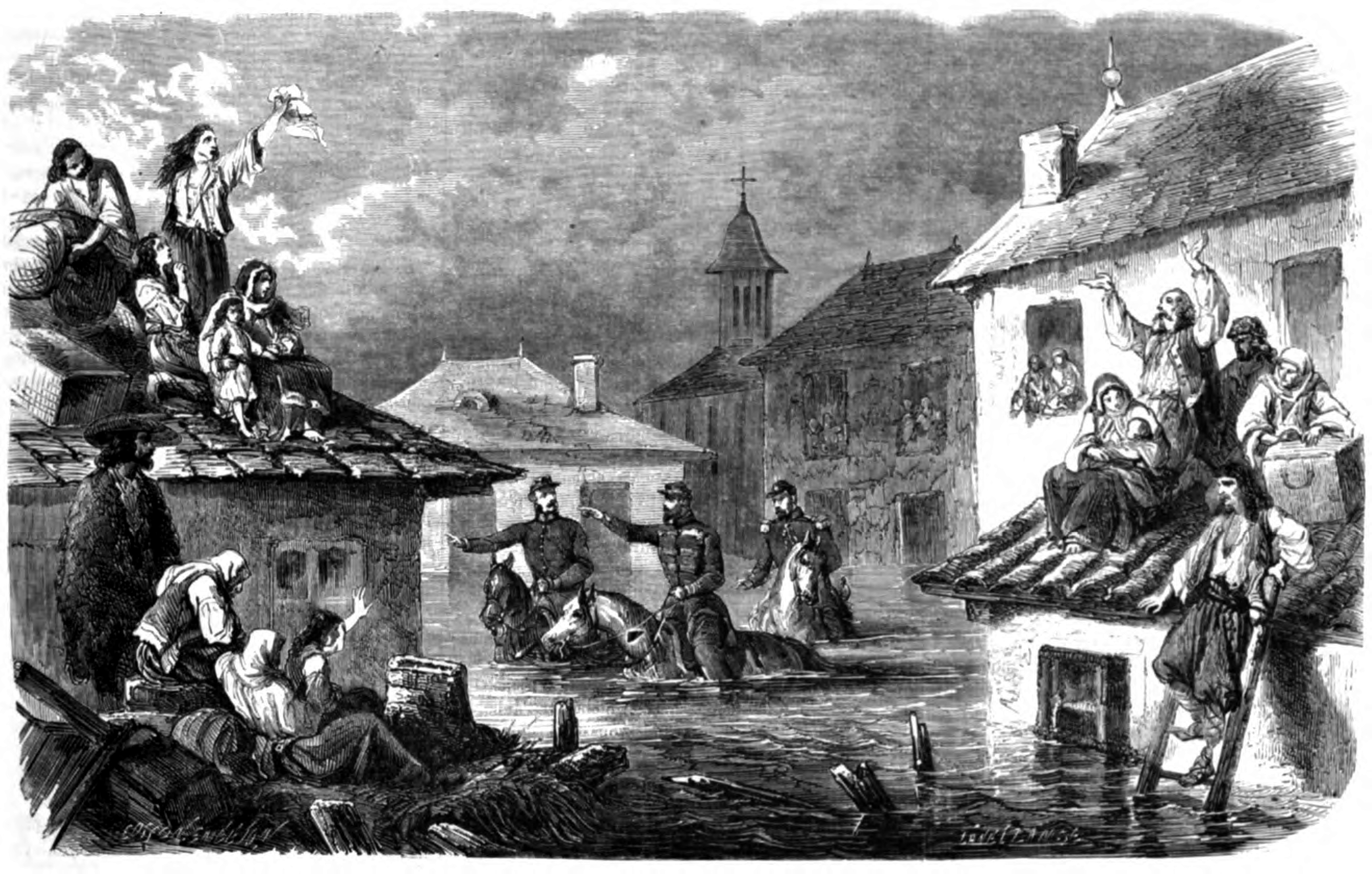
Prince Alexandru Ioan Cuza and Dr. Carol Davila visiting the Tabaci neighborhood during the flooding of Bucharest, three years before the catastrophe of 1865. The period between 1862 and 1865 was marked by severe flooding in this part of the country.

The sixth decade of the 19th century was marked by severe flooding in the area surrounding the capital, mainly caused by torrential rains. Additional snowmelt in the spring of 1865 caused one of the most devastating natural disasters in the history of Bucharest. Then, the Dâmbovița River flooded large parts of Bucharest, lying from Grozăvești to Vitan. According to some documents cited by historian Dan Falcan, the water level reached up to three meters in some areas, ravaging Calea Rahovei, the Manuc's Inn and the Mihai Vodă Hill. Moreover, the circulation was totally interrupted, and water and food supply were made with great difficulty.

In an article from The Illustrated London News appears that "nearly one-half of the straggling extent of Bucharest is submerged", showing the ampleness of the flood.

== Reactions ==
The troops, especially the artillery and engineers, were deployed on the spot with boats. Bread, meat, wine and spirits were voluntarily furnished by the wealthier inhabitants of the upper districts.

The press began a violent campaign against the government, accused that spent the money from taxes on unnecessary things, such as theaters, gardens, cattle breed improvement, etc., although the population was exposed to such calamities.

At the request of Prince Cuza, the government passed a law to dismantle the manorial mills that hindered the flow of Dâmbovița River. Likewise, it's passed a law according to that all mills and sluices that "throttle" waters to be dismantled, in order not to repeat the catastrophe. Historians note that work began immediately, with hundreds of prisoners taken to work from prisons around Bucharest. The river bed was cleaned and widened to 20 meters, and bridges with pylons in water were destroyed.
