= Mert River =

River in Turkey

Coordinates: 41°16′44″N 36°21′07″E

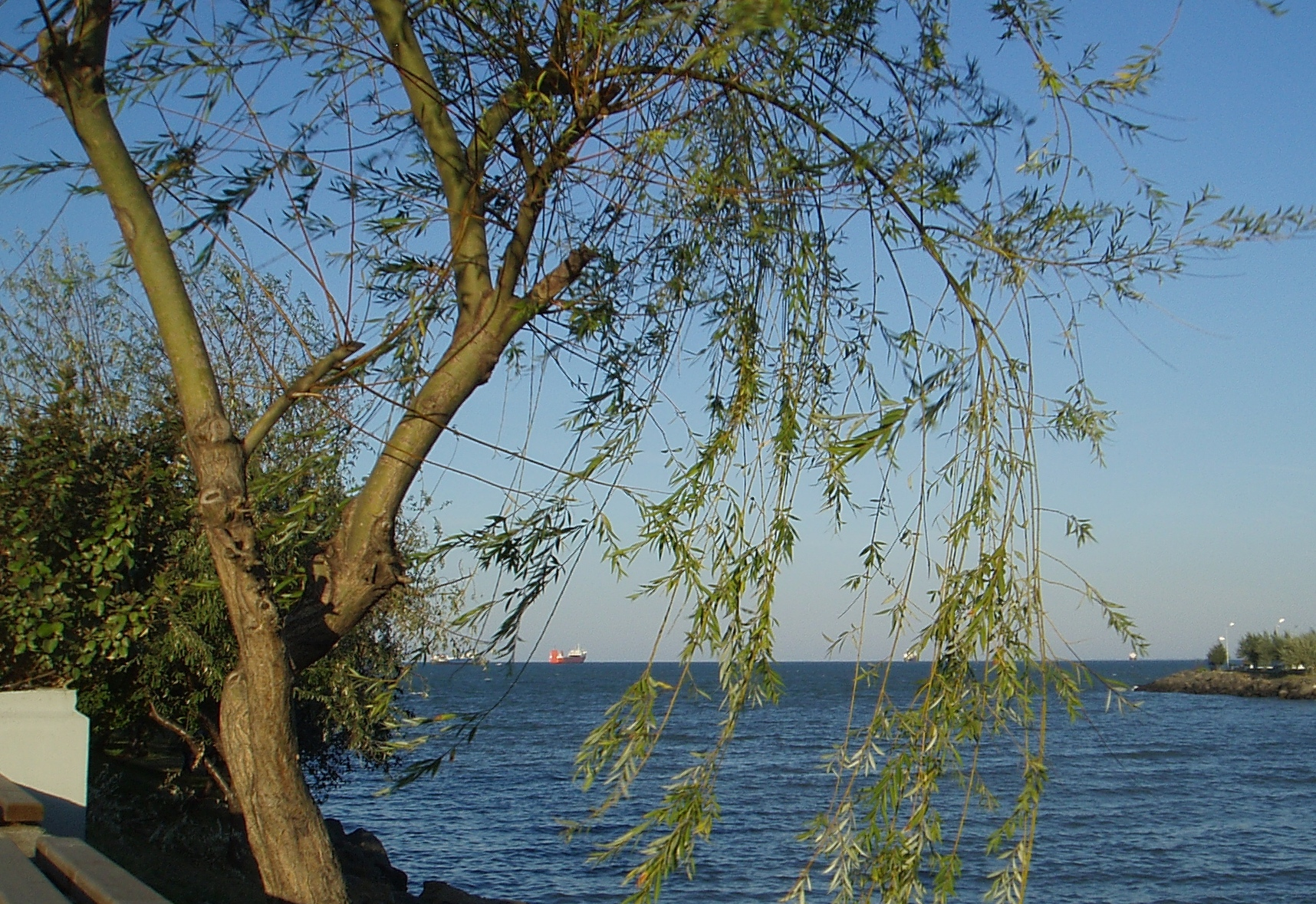
- River mouth at Samsun

The River Mert (Turkish: Mert Irmağı or Merd Irmağı); anciently, the Lycastus (Ancient Greek: Λύκαστος, romanized: Lykastos) is a river in Turkey which flows into the Black Sea at Samsun.

== Geography ==
In 2022 flow measurements were lacking.

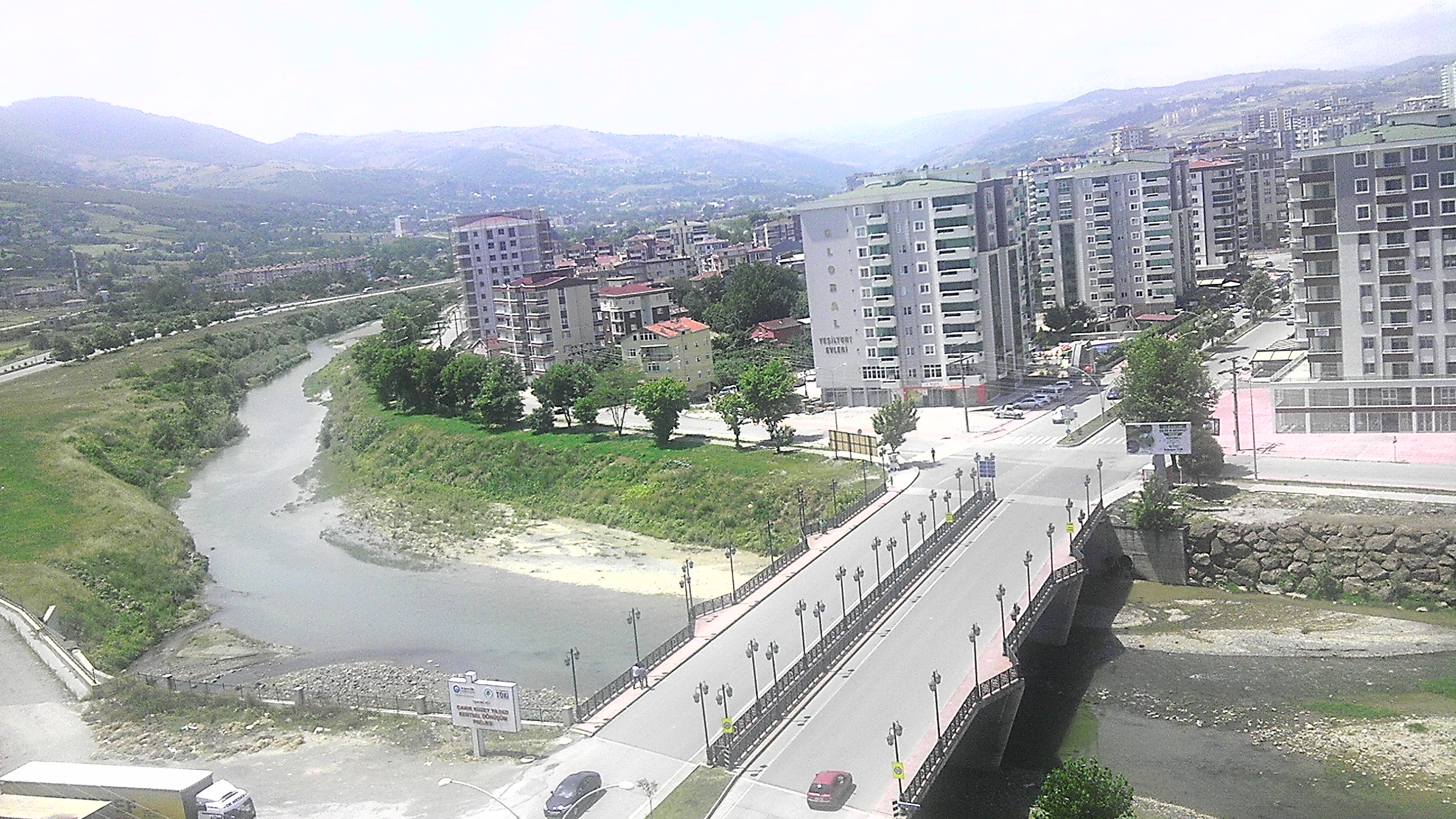
Samsun city in 2016

== History ==
The ancient town of Lycastus in Pontus was located on the river; the site has not been located.

== Pollution ==
A local politician claims the river suffers from domestic and industrial pollution, and fish die off in 2014 is being investigated by local officials.

== Flooding ==
In 2012 flooding killed 5 people.
