= 2012 Krasnodar Krai floods =

Severe flooding in southwest Russia

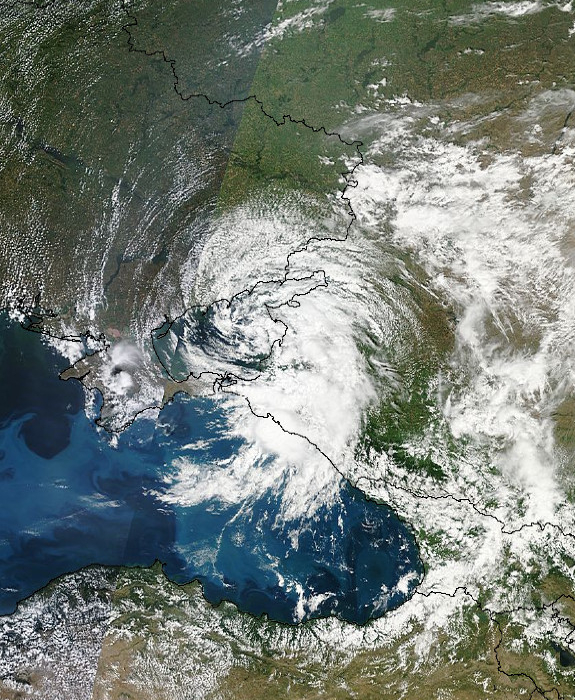
- Satellite image of the weather system that caused the floods
- Date: Began on 7 July 2012
- Location: Krasnodar Krai, Russia
- Deaths: 171

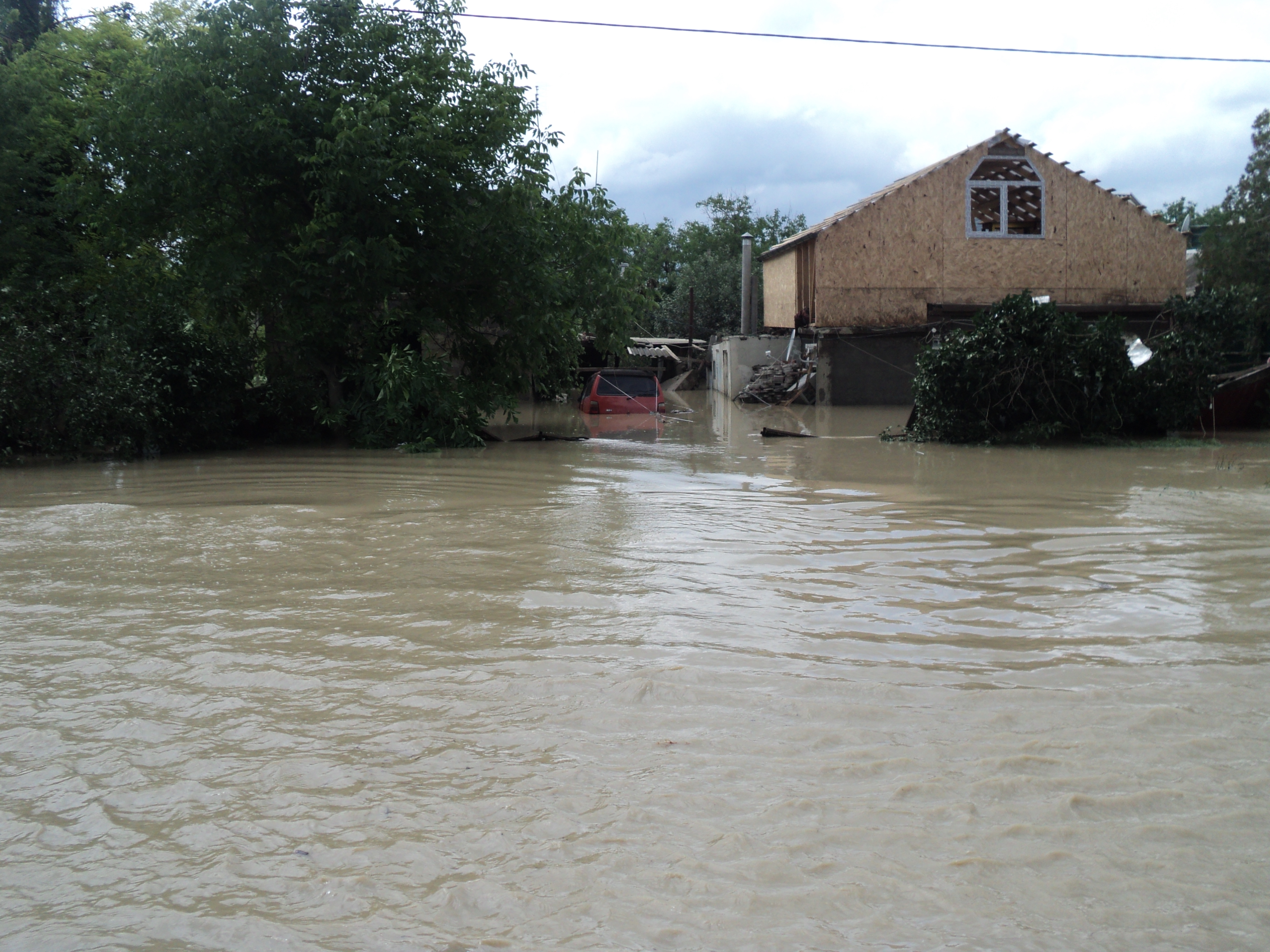
Flooding in Krymsk

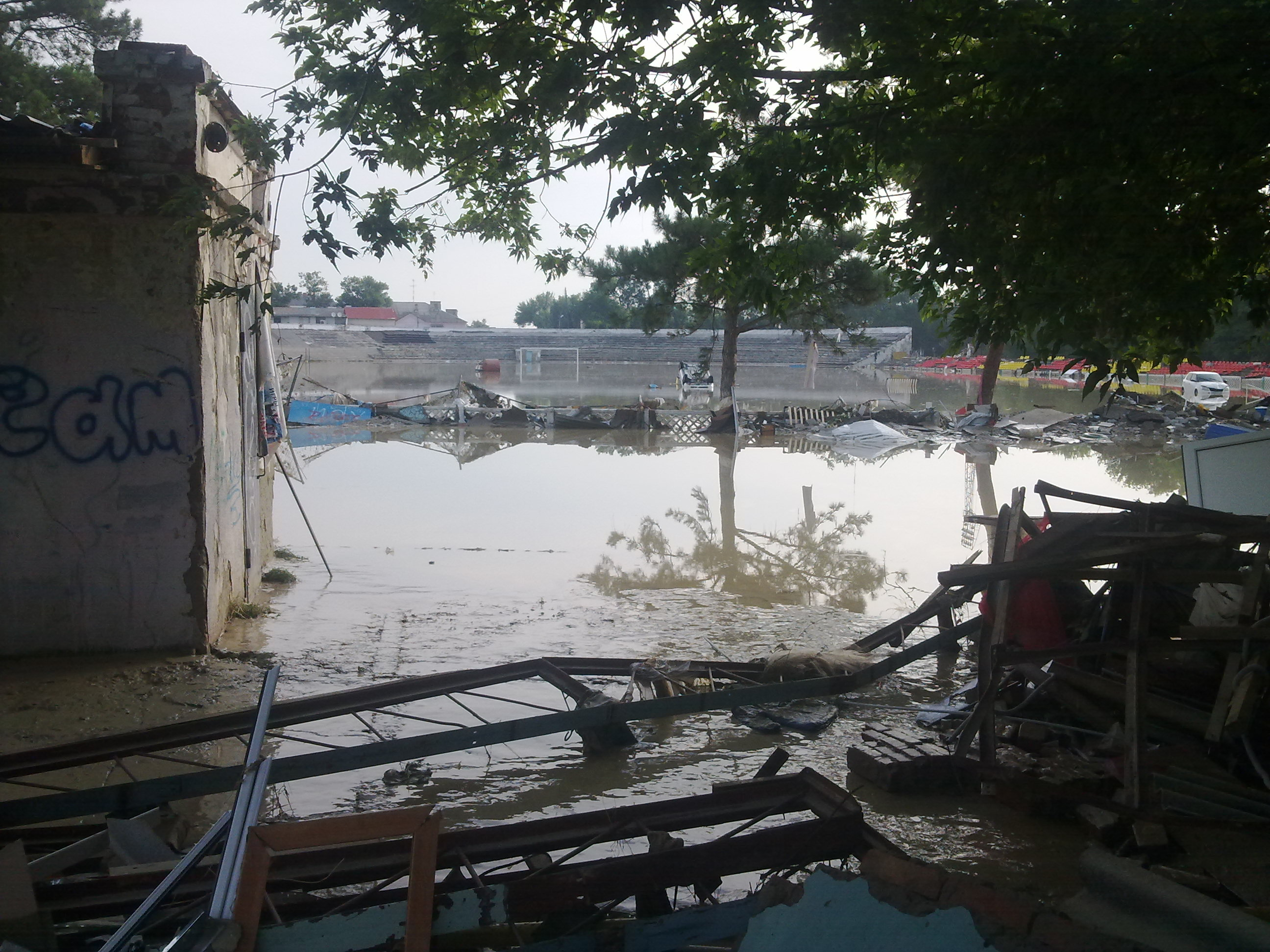
Flooded stadium of FC Vityaz Krymsk.

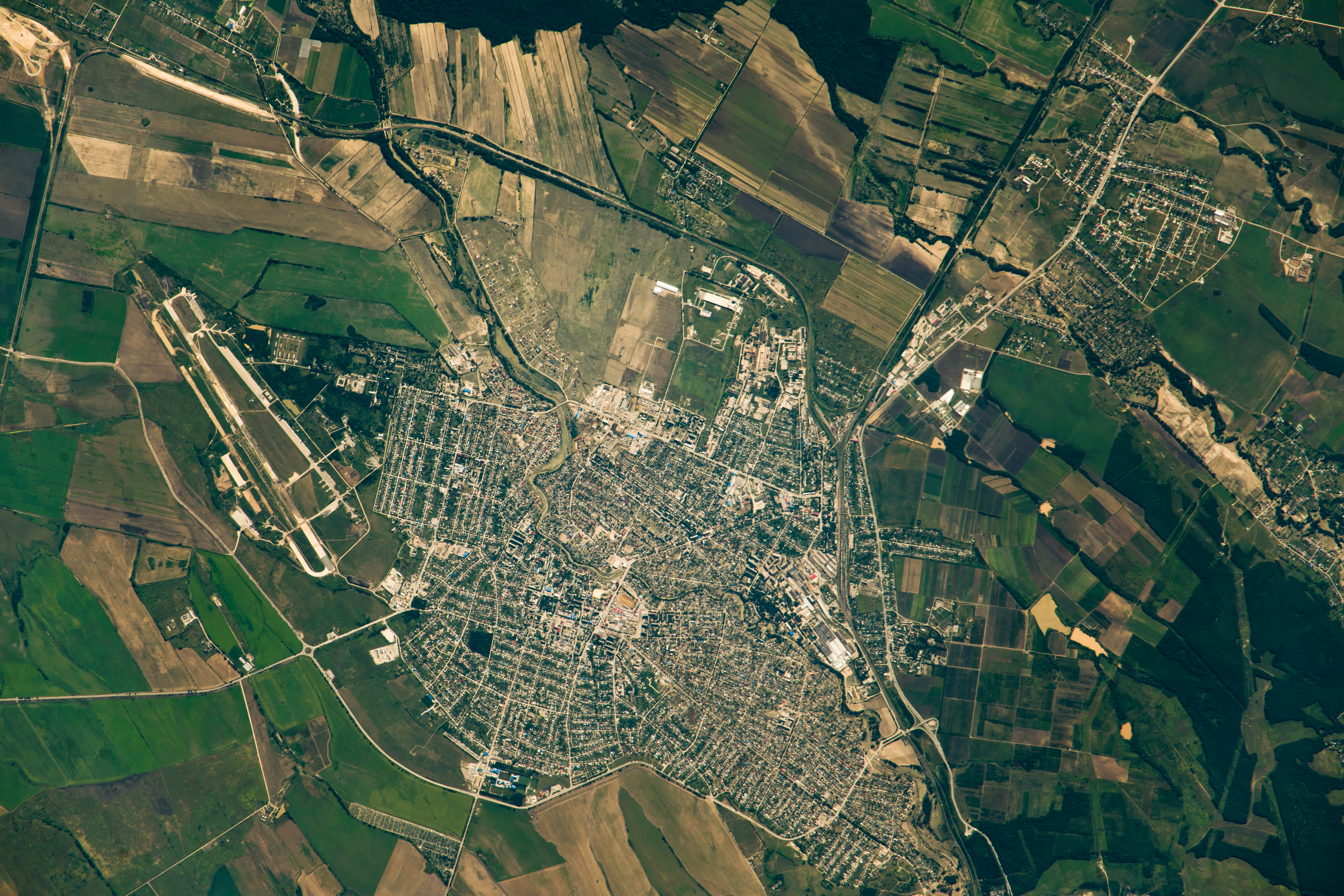
Photo of Krymsk taken by ISS crew on 10 July 2012

The 2012 Krasnodar Krai floods were floods in southwest Russia in early July 2012, mainly in Krasnodar Krai near the coast of the Black Sea. The equivalent of five months of rain fell overnight in some southern parts of the country according to the Hydrometeorological Centre of Russia. One hundred seventy-one people died during the floods. According to the governor of Krasnodar Krai, Aleksandr Tkachyov, "there was nothing of the kind for the last 70 years". The flood was part of the aftermath of an intense storm that hit Krasnodar, dropping almost half a year's worth of rainfall on the region over two days. Close to 30,000 people were affected by the floods.

Most of the victims lived in the city of Krymsk, 80 km (50 mi) from Krasnodar and 15 km (9 mi) from Novorossiysk, at the foot of a minor mountain range running along the coast of the Black Sea. Eyewitnesses reported that the flood hit the city around 2 a.m. local time on 7 July 2012 when most residents were asleep. The flood wave reached the height of 7 m (23 ft), submerging many houses to the ceiling and drowning those who could not escape in time. There were also deaths on the coast of the Black Sea in Gelendzhik, a resort, and in Novorossiysk, a port.

== Meteorological history ==
A low pressure area moved westward through the Black Sea. On July 7, the system dropped 280 mm (11 in) of rainfall in a few hours in parts of southwestern Russia.

== Rainfall ==
According to reports, the rainfall totaled 275 mm (10.83 in) of rain over the region, equivalent to three or four months' worth of precipitation in a typical year.

== Response ==
The Russian government has acknowledged that it was aware of the rising waters at 10:00 p.m. Friday night but failed to adequately notify the residents of Krymsk of the approaching flood, which arrived at 2:00 a.m. Sirens were sounded and warning issued over loudspeakers but most residents were asleep. The head of the Krymsk district council, Vasily Krutko, was dismissed. In August 2013, a Russian investigation convicted Krutko of negligence.

Russian Prime Minister Dmitry Medvedev set up a commission to help the victims. On 7 July, Russian President Vladimir Putin arrived at the area and held a meeting with the representatives of all the services involved in search operations and tackling the consequences of the disaster, and then left to Gelendzhik which also suffered seriously. Earlier on the same day, Russian Emergency Situations Minister Vladimir Puchkov said those people whose houses were totally destroyed by the floods will receive 100,000 rubles compensation (about $3,000), and that 50,000 rubles ($1,500) will be paid to the residents whose dwellings were damaged. Approximately 5,200 homes have been affected by the disaster.

On 8 July 2012, Putin signed a presidential decree declaring 9 July a day of mourning in Russia for the victims of a bus crash in Ukraine and the devastating floods.

The head of the liberal opposition Yabloko party, Sergey Mitrokhin, said on his Twitter feed that local activists had blamed the ferocity of the flood on the opening of sluice gates at a reservoir but Krasnodar's regional administration dismissed the allegation as "absolute nonsense", RIA Novosti news agency said. Furthermore, there are no controllable sluice gates in the nearby Neberdzhaevskoe reservoir, thus refuting the allegation.

On 14 July, about 2,000 tons of humanitarian aid had been delivered to Krymsk, according to a spokesman for the local emergencies administration. The humanitarian aid included safe drinking water, foodstuffs, bed linen, hygiene items, and children's clothes. Humanitarian aid arrived from Azerbaijan, Belarus, Adygea, Kalmykia, Dagestan, Ingushetia, Kabardino-Balkaria, Karachay-Cherkessia, North Ossetia, the Astrakhan, Volgograd, Rostov, Moscow and Tula regions, and from the city of Moscow.

A day later, the Krasnodar Krai administration said in a statement posted on its website that Russia's regional and federal governments would allocate almost 9 billion rubles ($280 million) to restore Krymsk.

== Effects ==
Oil pipeline operator Transneft said it halted crude shipments out of Novorossiysk, but that its infrastructure in the port was unaffected by the weather.
