= 2011 European floods =

2011 floods in 5 countries

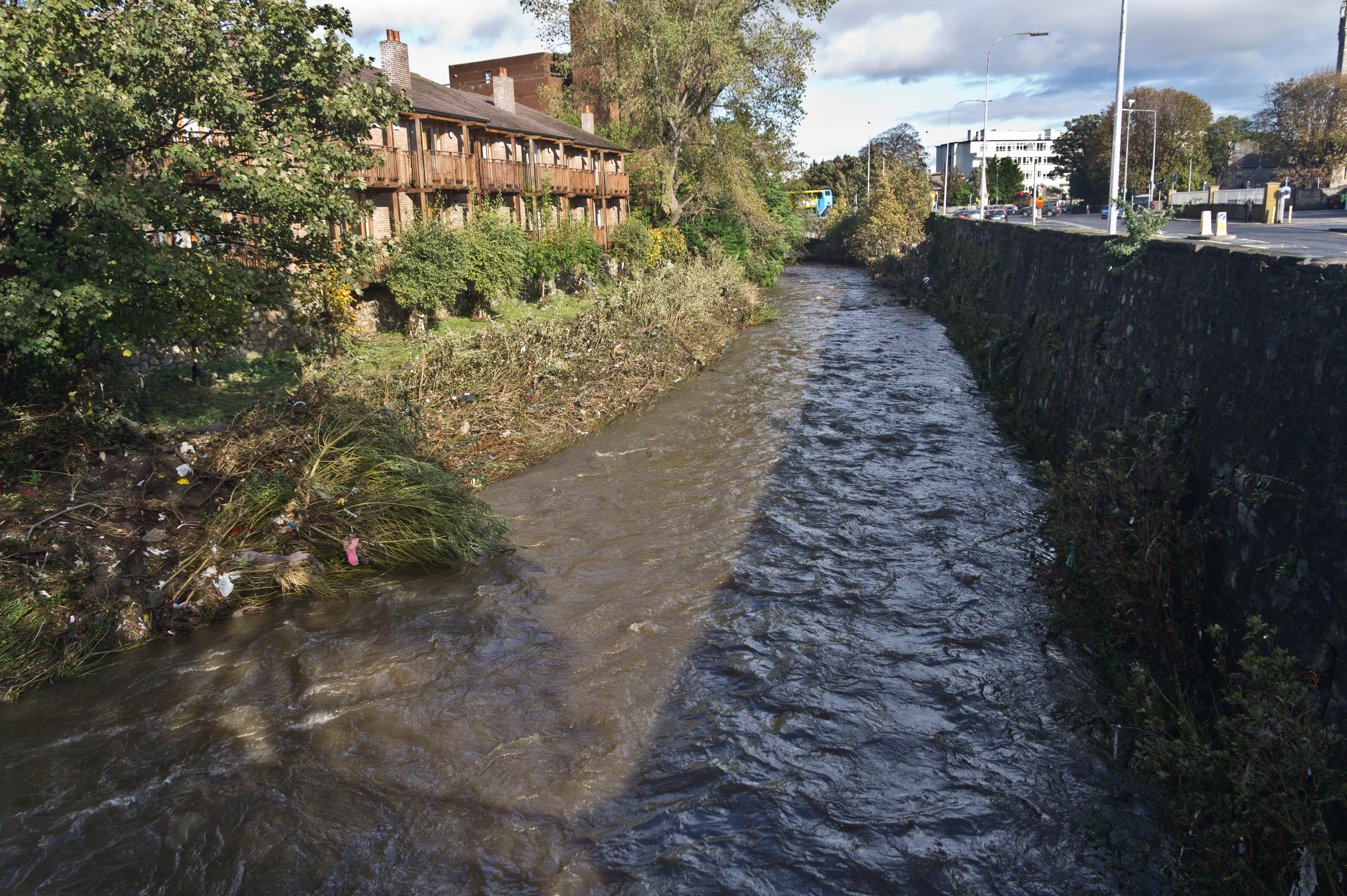
- Flooding in Dublin on 25 October.
- Date: 24 October 2011 – 10 November 2011
- Location: Ireland, Italy, France, Spain, parts of North Africa
- Deaths: 17
- Property damage: >€926 million (2011 Euro) >$1.25 billion (2011 USD)

The 2011 floods in Europe, were caused by a series of storms in the fall, including Cyclone Meeno and Tropical Storm Rolf. The floods occurred in late October–early November in Spain, France, Italy, and Ireland. In Italy, the River Po rose 4 m (13 ft) in Turin and a number of people (including two children) died in Genoa. A state of emergency in the Italian regions of Liguria and Tuscany was declared after floods killed 10 people on 27 October, causing mudslides. In Ireland, a state of emergency was declared in Dublin three days before.

== Ireland ==
Thousands of homes and businesses were destroyed during sudden flash floods around the country. Dublin City Council declared a major emergency. Dundrum Town Centre in Dublin, one of Europe's biggest shopping centres, was evacuated shortly before 8 pm on 24 October 2011 after floodwaters surged through the doors, destroying most stores. The owner of a Mexican restaurant in the complex said five-feet of water had rushed down steps towards his business, causing thousands of euro worth of damage. Roads around County Dublin and County Wicklow remained shut the following day.

Two deaths were reported in the country during October. Cecilia De Jesus, a 58-year-old Filipino care worker who had recently become an Irish citizen, drowned in her basement flat on Parnell Road, Harold's Cross, Dublin. She had only recently moved into the flat. Her body was discovered after emergency services pumped the water out. The other death was Ciaran Jones, a member of the Garda Síochána who was swept into the River Liffey at Ballysmuttan Bridge in Manor Kilbride, County Wicklow. Taoiseach Enda Kenny and Tánaiste Eamon Gilmore paid tribute to the dead.

Monaghan town centre was reported to be "impassable". Houses in Ballybay, County Monaghan, were evacuated due to a collapse.

Roads in counties Carlow, Cavan, Louth and Kilkenny were impassable. The Sally Gap and the Wicklow Gap were badly hit. The Slea Head Road in County Kerry was shut down after it flooded. Motorists abandoned their vehicles and fled from the floods.

In Northern Ireland, 18 people, including two children, were rescued by boat in Beragh, County Tyrone, with a new £1 million GAA centre sustaining damage. Newry, Omagh and Strabane were also badly hit.

According to Met Éireann, a rainfall of up to 85 mm (3.3 in), equal to an average month's norm, fell across the Dublin area within three hours. There was record rainfall at Casement Aerodrome.

== Italy ==
The city of Genoa sustained flash floods that erupted when 356 millimetres of rain fell in six hours on 4 November. About six people died. The receding waters in that city revealed heaps of overturned cars, furniture and mud dispersed across the streets. Several people were reported missing in the city. According to Genoa mayor Marta Vicenzi, the floods constituted "a completely unexpected tragedy". Near Pozzuoli, a tree fell on a car, killing the driver. A bridge across the Pellice stream in the countryside collapsed due to rushing waters with no reported injuries. Flooding also occurred in Venice. The muddy water reached Cinque Terre, while the ports of Vernazza and Monterosso were swamped by hundreds of tonnes of debris and mud.

The Serie A matches between Napoli and Juventus, as well as between Genoa and Inter Milan, were postponed. An investigation was opened in the country into whether floods were the fault of official negligence and illegal building.

== France ==
Five people have been confirmed dead and one person was swept away in the river Var. About 750 people were evacuated from flooded areas in Fréjus, Roquebrune and Tourves. The preliminary damage from floods in the south of France throughout one week has been estimated at between €550 million and €800 million. About 7,500 homes in the departments of Var and Alpes-Maritimes lost internet or phone service on 6–7 November.

2011 European floods

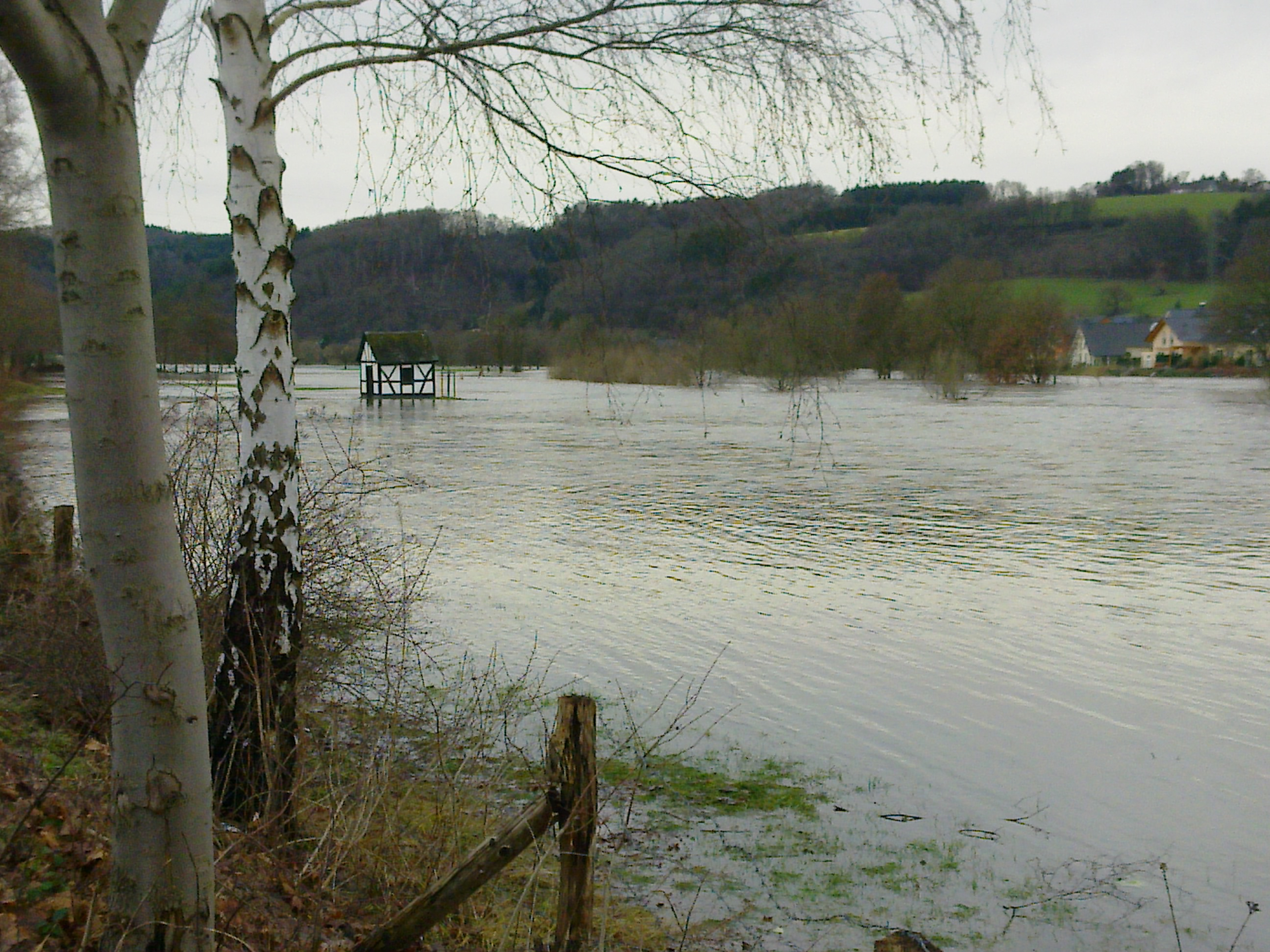
The Sieg in Alzenbach, January 2011

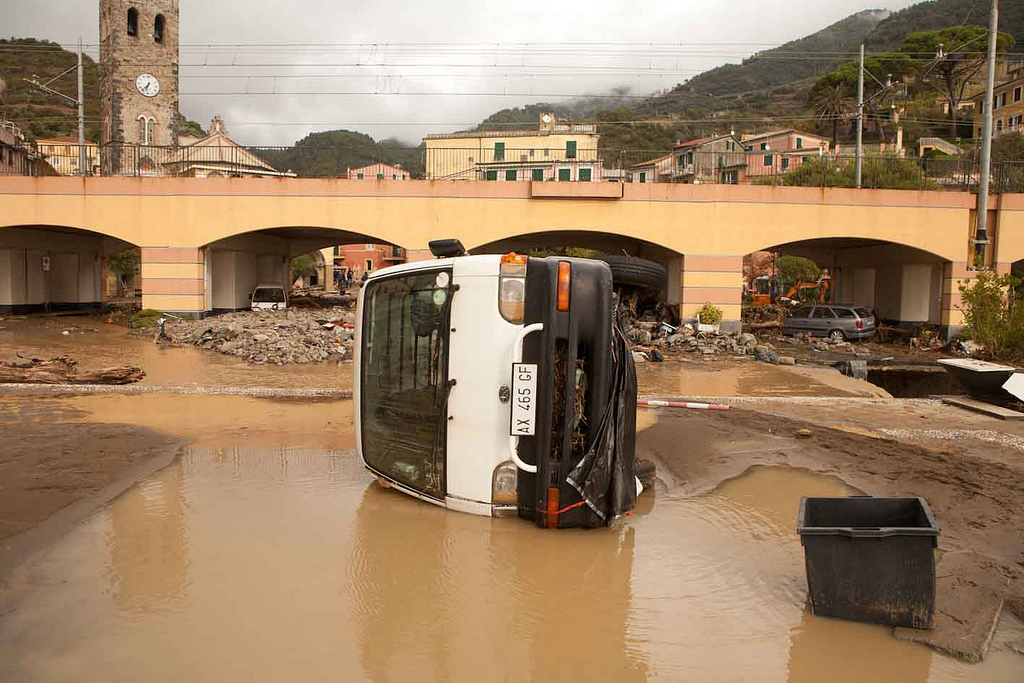
Flooding of Monterosso al Mare, October 2011

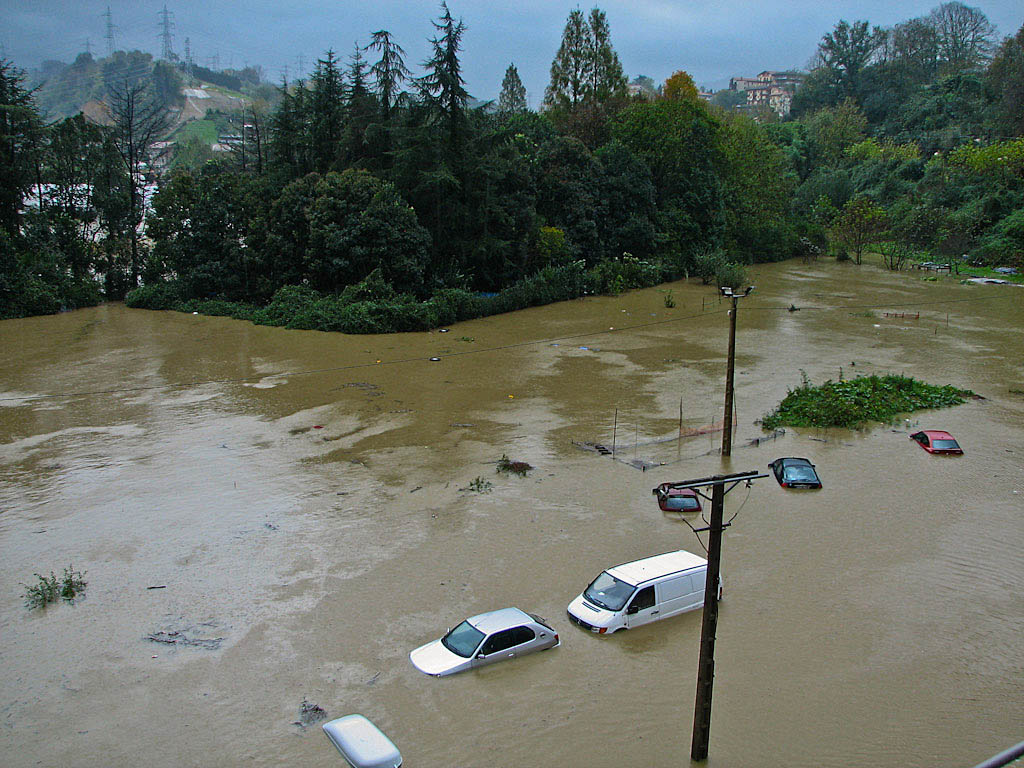
Flood in Hernani, Gipuzkoa, November 2011
