= Floods in Turkey =

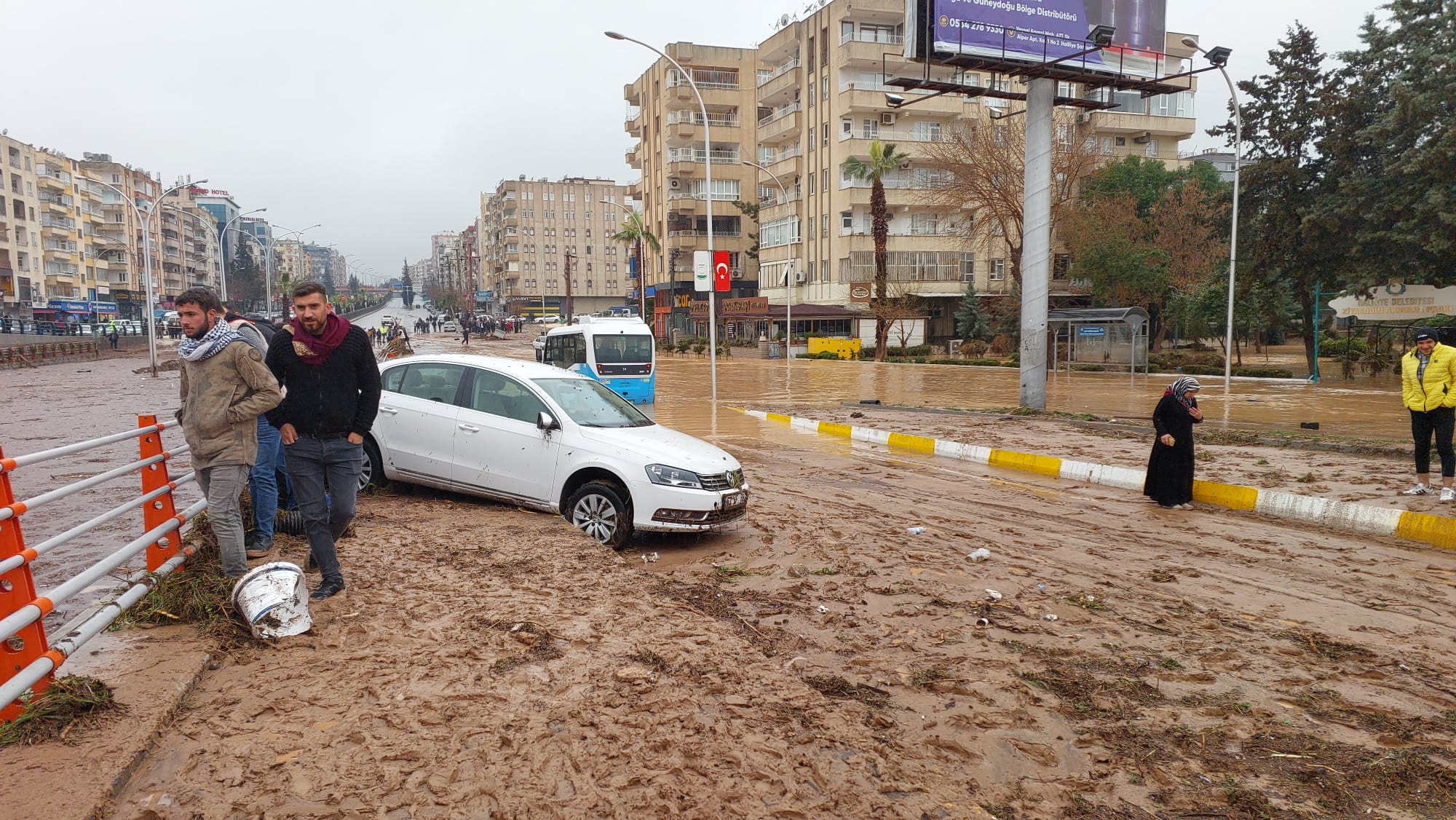
Street flooding and stranded vehicles in Şanlıurfa during the March 2023 floods in southeastern Turkey

Floods in Turkey occur frequently, affecting various regions, particularly those with riverine areas and prolonged heavy rainfall. According to the Turkish Disaster Database, between 1960 and 2014, Turkey experienced 1,076 flood events, resulting in 795 fatalities and economic damages estimated at approximately $800 million. The Kızılırmak, Sakarya, and Fırat rivers are the most notable river basins contributing to these floods. The Marmara region, including Istanbul, and the Black Sea region, particularly provinces such as Kastamonu and Sinop, experienced flooding due to heavy rainfall. Climate change in Turkey may be intensifying floods.

== History ==
=== 2026 ===
A heavy downpour, the worst Istanbul had seen in more than 80 years, caused flooding on 14–15 October. Four times the average monthly rainfall fell in just 24 hours. Numerous homes and businesses were inundated with floodwaters, which also washed many vehicles away from the streets. Six people died. The governor of the city said rainfall was the heaviest since 1942. People were also killed in Kocaeli in October.

=== 2023 ===
2023 Turkish floods
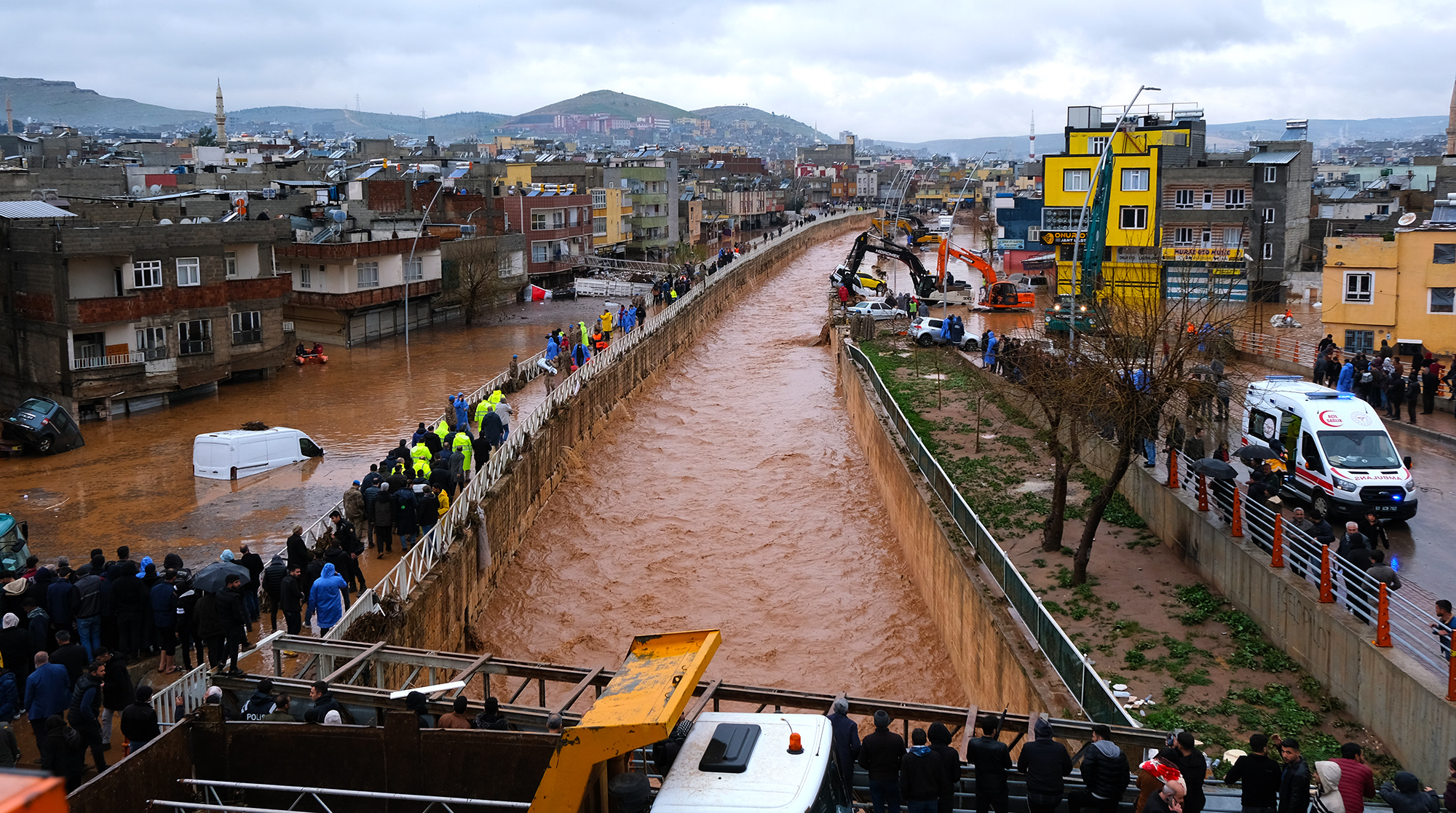
- Şanlıurfa
- Date: 15 March 2023
- Cause: Floods caused by torrential rains
- Deaths: 21

The 2023 Turkish floods were a series of devastating floods that occurred in two Turkish provinces, Şanlıurfa and Adıyaman, on 15 March 2023. The floods were caused by torrential rains that occurred just one month after a deadly earthquake struck the same regions.

==== Impact ====
At least 21 people died in the floods; 17 in Şanlıurfa and four in Adıyaman. Among the dead included a one-year-old child. A container home in Tut, where earthquake survivors were living, was swept away, killing two people, and four others were reported missing. In Şanlıurfa, five Syrian nationals were found dead inside a flooded basement apartment, while two other bodies were retrieved from a trapped van at an underpass. Additionally, four people were killed, and two firefighters were reported missing.

The floods caused extensive damage, and several people were evacuated from a drenched campsite where earthquake survivors were sheltering in tents. In Şanlıurfa, the intensive care unit of the Eyyübiye Training and Research Hospital was flooded, forcing 25 patients to be evacuated. Floods affected traffic; an underpass in Haliliye District was flooded and trapped many people in vehicles. Nearly 2,000 homes and offices were damaged in the province.

==== Rescue operations ====
The Turkish disaster management agency reported that more than a dozen professional divers were involved in the rescue efforts in each of the two provinces. Firefighters rescued trapped vehicle occupants at an underpass in Haliliye District.

==== Impact on earthquake survivors ====
The floods have increased the misery of thousands of people who were already left homeless and displaced by the earthquake that struck the same region on 6 February 2023, which resulted in the deaths of more than 59,000 people, and collapsed or severely damaged 300,000 buildings.

==== Response ====
The Turkish government pledged to provide assistance to those affected by the floods and urged citizens to remain vigilant and take necessary precautions during the ongoing severe weather conditions.

Deputy chairman for the Republican People's Party, Ali Öztunç, criticized the Justice and Development Party, calling them incompetent and uninterested in assisting the affected.

On 15 March, the General Directorate of Meteorology said rain was expected in the earthquake-affected area for the next five days.

=== 2021 ===
2021 Turkey floods
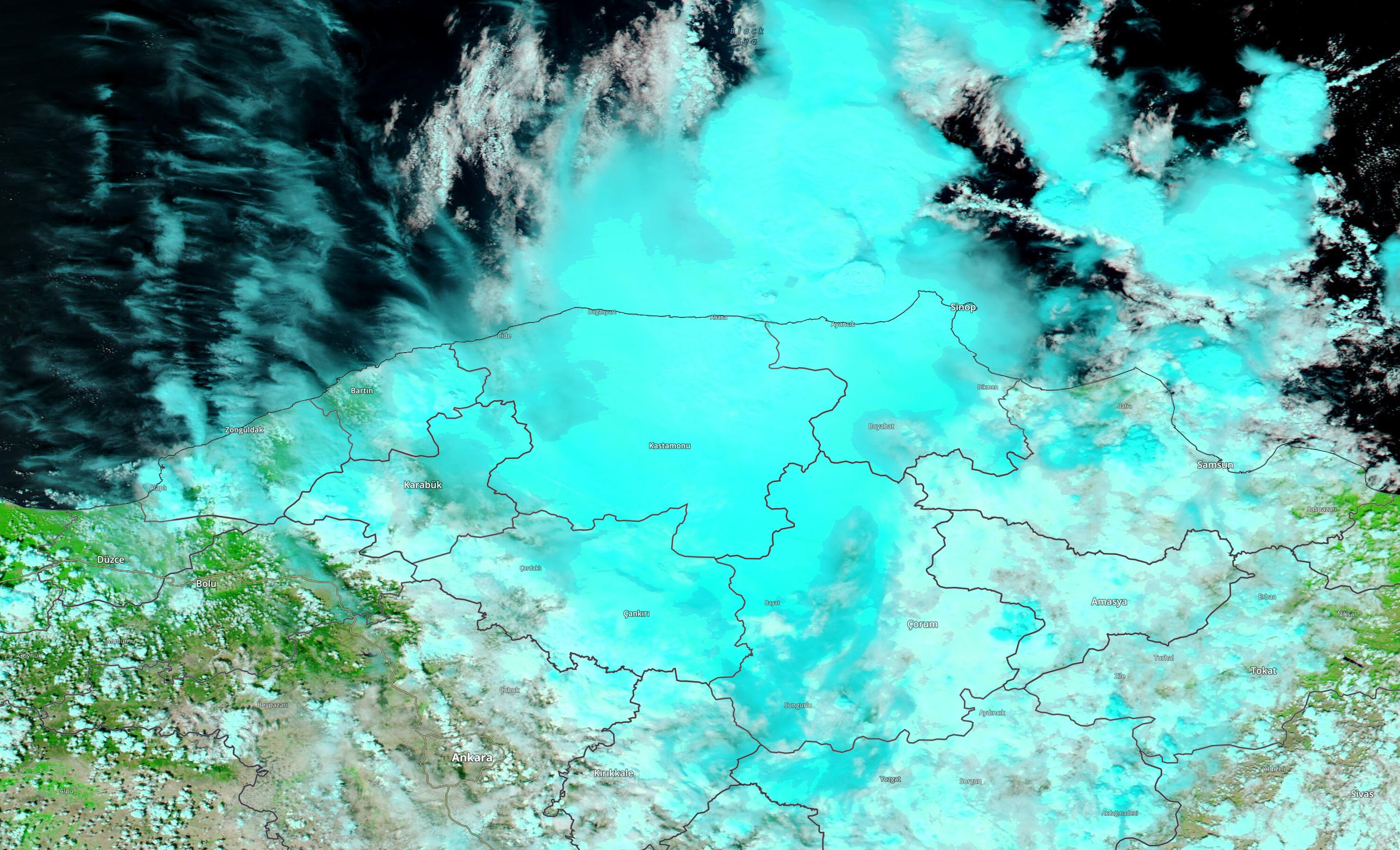
- NASA satellite image of the western Black Sea region during the flood.
- Date: 11 August 2021 – 20 August 2021
- Location: Bartın, Kastamonu and Sinop provinces, Turkey
- Cause: Torrential rainfall, urbanization, climate change
- Deaths: 97
- Property damage: $300 million (2021 USD)

In August 2021, the Black Sea region in Turkey was affected by catastrophic flooding, as a series of thunderstorms that began on 7 August 2021 and continued until the 14th in northern Turkey caused several floods and landslides. The water rose to 4 metres (13 ft) in some locations, and the floods have been described as the worst in Turkey's history. 97 people died and about 228 more were injured in the floods, and more than 1800 people were evacuated as many people were rescued from rooftops. Reports have shown that at least 454 buildings had sustained significant damage. Bridges were also damaged or destroyed, and the infrastructure of multiple towns were significantly affected. Experts have stated that urbanization and climate change in Turkey have made the floods' worse, although to what extent each factor was responsible has been disputed.

As a response to the floods, the government started a disaster relief campaign, which has faced criticism for using donations instead of taxpayer money. Affected provinces were made disaster areas, and financial help was given to those affected. There have been numerous claims of a hydroelectric power plant malfunction during the flood, which the government has denied. Others have claimed that the public was misled by officials before the event, and that the missing count was an undercount; however, neither of these claims have been confirmed.

==== Causes ====
===== Background =====
Unlike the western and southern coasts of Turkey, where summers are generally hot and dry, torrential summer rains on the northern coasts are common, especially east of the Bosporus, as there is no summer dry season, and as precipitation generally amounts to at least 1,000 millimetres (40 inches) a year. Recent data also suggests that days with heavy rainfall are increasing in northern Turkey, and Borzou Daraghi of The Independent has called the floods "one of multiple climate change-induced calamities" Turkey has faced this summer. However, meteorologist Mikdat Kadıoğlu claimed that climate change "was being used as a scapegoat" in flood events such as this one, and argued that while climate change was partially responsible, other factors were also at play, principally urbanization. Geologists have also pointed to the flood plain of the streams around the flooded area, which have narrowed due to construction, while others claimed that poorly made bridges worsened the destruction.

===== Meteorological history =====
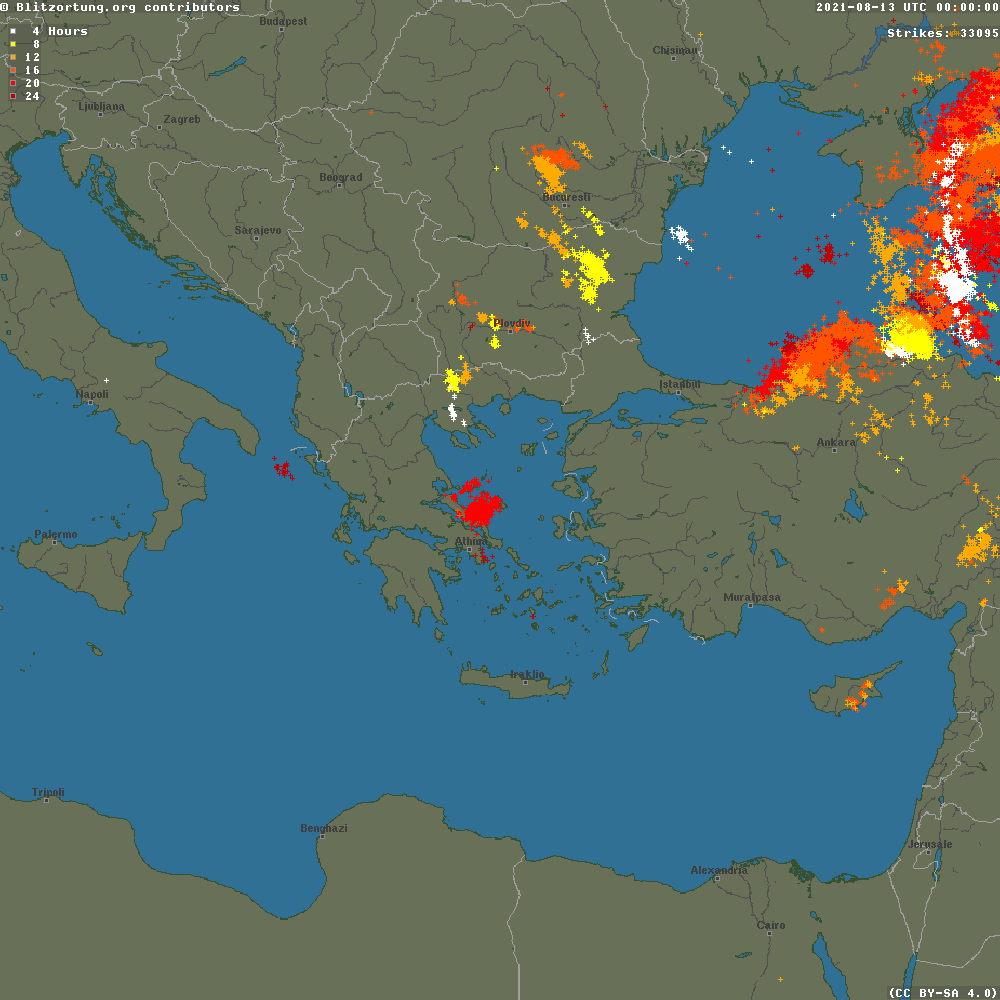
A lightning map of Southeastern Europe from 11 August 2021, indicating strong to severe thunderstorms over the Black Sea.

On 6 August 2021, a long-lasting complex of thunderstorms formed in eastern Marmara, with an associated cyclone in Eastern Europe, causing isolated heavy downpours in Istanbul, Gebze and Izmit overnight. The next day, the system moved eastward toward the western Black Sea region, where it would stall for around a week with CAPE values occasionally exceeding 6000 J/kg, creating very favorable conditions for severe downpours.

While heavy rainfall remained occasional from the 7th to the 9th, the heaviest rainfall occurred from the 10th to the 12th of August, and multiple flash flood warnings were issued by the General Directorate of Meteorology. Some stations recorded rainfall exceeding 400 millimetres (16 inches) over these 48 hours, and numerical models suggested the possibility of a local maximum as high as 1,281 mm (50.4 in), with hourly rainfall rates well above 125 millimetres (5 inches) per hour. This likely caused severe flooding in Kastamonu to start about a day into the second rainy period, as a nearby river burst its banks. Other regions also accumulated considerable rainfall, as Ayancık, Küre, Pınarbaşı, Azdavay and İnebolu received 240 mm (9.4 in), 198 mm (7.8 in), 167 mm (6.6 in), 145 mm (5.7 in), and 123 mm (4.8 in) of rainfall respectively, mostly in the span of a couple of hours.

==== Impact ====
The event has been described by Interior Minister Süleyman Soylu as "the worst flood disaster" he has ever seen. Bartın, Kastamonu and Sinop provinces were the most affected, where floods destroyed at least 6 bridges, tore up trees and cut off electricity to "hundreds of villages", as "fast-moving waters coursing through city streets" were "swarming buildings and washing away vehicles". The water rose to around 4 meters (13 feet) in some areas, and spread across a region 240 kilometres (150 miles) wide, according to the Disaster and Emergency Management Presidency (AFAD).

Bozkurt, a town and district in Kastamonu, was among the most severely affected areas, as floodwaters descending from the Küre Mountains led to a fast-moving current along the town's center. This was worsened by the flood's effects on the logging area south of town, as logs drifted through the town center, leading to further damage. There have also been claims of misleading announcements before the flood that delayed citizen response and cost lives, although this has not been confirmed.

Bozkurt mayor Muammer Yanık lamented the state of the town, which was destroyed, according to him, "in a way that cannot be described", while Sinop mayor Barış Ayhan said that "the infrastructure in Ayancık has completely collapsed, there is no electricity or water". The village of Babaçay, in Sinop, was "almost completely wiped out", as most buildings, including those made to accommodate disaster victims, were toppled, damaged, or destroyed. AFAD announced that electricity could not be supplied to 4 villages in Bartın, 180 villages in Kastamonu and 87 villages in Sinop in Ayancık and Türkeli districts, as water had inundated power plants in the region. At least 81 people have died, 228 were injured while many more are missing, and at least 454 buildings were significantly damaged.

==== Response ====
===== Domestic =====
A total of 2472 people were evacuated, and the gendarmerie was dispatched, along with more than 9000 emergency workers; officials and volunteers from AFAD. Helicopters were used to supply electricity to the affected areas, and to rescue people from flooded buildings. Visiting the region on 13 August, President Recep Tayyip Erdoğan declared Kastamonu, Sinop and Bartın disaster areas. Gubernatorial positions were changed to manage the disaster more effectively, as Bozkurt governor Okan Yenidünya was removed from his post to be replaced by Murat Atıcı. The government has cited Atıcı's experience with natural disasters as the reason for this change. Legal action was also taken, as a building contractor was taken into custody, and has been found guilty. The government has offered financial help to affected communities, and organizations including AFAD have sent at least 10 million liras to affected zones. However, a controversial donation campaign was started by the government to aid relief, which many opposition politicians criticized, claiming that taxpayer money should have been enough.

Authorities had previously warned the area for potential flash flooding, however, many in the area felt that the warnings were inadequate for the severity of the event. Many CHP lawmakers and certain experts said that the floods' effects have been worsened by construction on river banks, which the ruling party has allowed with "lax regulations". President of the Grand Assembly of Turkey Mustafa Şentop emphasized the need for long-term planning, arguing that urbanization on riverbeds "might not cause problems for decades, but perhaps once a century we see such a grim situation", adding that Turkey "needs to plan for centuries later." Many residents in Kastamonu voiced concerns about the missing count, claiming that many more people were missing than official reports have shown, and opposition politician Hasan Baltacı claimed that a total of 329 people were missing, claims which the governor has denied. Interior Minister Soylu argued that the floods should not be politicized, while denying rumors claiming that the floods were caused by a malfunction in the hydroelectric power plant near the affected area.

===== International =====
- Azerbaijan – President Ilham Aliyev sent his condolences to the Turkish president, saying that he hopes for a quick recovery of those injured and affected.
- Belarus – President Alexander Lukashenko also sent his condolences, stating that the floods in Turkey were received "with great sadness" in Belarus.
- Israel – Minister of Defence Beni Gantz offered to send a rescue team to aid Turkey.
- Kyrgyzstan – President Sadyr Japarov offered his condolences for the people who have lost their lives in the flood.
- Ukraine – President Volodymyr Zelenskyy sent his condolences to Turkey, stating that the people of Ukraine share the victims' pain.

The European Union, Ireland, Iran, Pakistan, Bosnia and Herzegovina, Serbia, Belgium ve Kuwait have also sent their condolences.

=== 2009 ===
2009 Istanbul Floods
Meteorological history
- Duration: September 2009

Overall effects
- Fatalities: At least 31
- Damage: Estimated $70–175 million
- Areas affected: Istanbul, Tekirdağ, rest of the Marmara region

The 2009 Turkish flash floods were a series of flash floods that occurred on 9 September 2009 in and around Istanbul, Tekirdağ, and the rest of the Marmara region of Turkey. The floods led to the death of at least 31 people and the cost of damage has been estimated as being in excess of $70 million.

==== Background ====
The floods followed a two-day period of heavy rainfall, the worst the country had seen for 80 years, which had begun on 7 September. During the evening and night of 8 September the rain became increasingly strong leading to flash floods across the city early on the morning of 9 September, with low-lying areas to the west of the city being the worst affected. Turkey's Minister of Environment and Forests, Veysel Eroğlu, described the rain as the "worst in 500 years". The floods were created by the Marmara sea, an inlet of the Mediterranean sea.

==== Impacts ====
At least 31 people were killed across the region and dozens were stranded in cars or on rooftops and an unknown number remain missing. Three of the deaths occurred in western suburbs of Istanbul on 8 September, 21 people lost their lives in Istanbul on 9 September and seven more in neighboring Tekirdağ Province, where two further people are missing. Muammer Güler, governor of Istanbul, said 20 people were injured by the floods. Officials and experts have blamed the high death toll on unplanned urbanization in Istanbul, which has seen buildings constructed in river beds, and an inadequate infrastructure system.

In some places the water reached a metre (3 ft) in height, cutting access to Istanbul's main airport and the highway running to Bulgaria and Greece. According to state-run news agency Anatolia Agency, one building collapsed, although there were no reported casualties. Police were deployed to prevent looting from abandoned shops and factories, although the press has recorded instances of looting from vehicles. In north-west Turkey two bridges on the Bahçeköy–Saray highway were also destroyed by floods at the same time. More than 200 cars have been washed into the Marmara Sea and dozens of trucks damaged.

===== Emergency response =====
Since the floods began on Tuesday, more than 1,000 people have been rescued by emergency services. Turkish officials have also stated that more than 900 firefighters and rescuers are working in the affected areas, backed up by a fleet of more than 200 vehicles and 30 dinghies. Interior Minister Beşir Atalay has pledged to compensate residents of Istanbul affected by the floods. The Red Crescent Society has dispatched tents, blankets, food and personnel to the area to help survivors.

==== International reaction ====
- Greece – Greece is "ready to send any kind of aid" to the area according to the Greek ambassador to Turkey and according to the Greek Foreign Minister "to extend every type of assistance to the Turkish people and officials", but made no note to tourists.
