= List of disasters by cost =

Disasters can have high costs associated with responding to and recovering from them. This page lists the estimated economic costs of relatively recent disasters.

The costs of disasters vary considerably depending on a range of factors, such as the geographical location where they occur. When a large disaster occurs in a wealthy country, the financial damage may be large, but when a comparable disaster occurs in a poorer country, the actual financial damage may appear to be relatively small. This is in part due to the difficulty of measuring the financial damage in areas that lack insurance. For example, the 2004 Indian Ocean earthquake and tsunami, with a death toll of around 230,000 people, cost a "mere" $15 billion, whereas in the Deepwater Horizon oil spill, in which 11 people died, the damage was six times higher.

The most expensive disaster in human history is the Chernobyl disaster, costing an estimated $700 billion. Chernobyl's circumstances make it a unique but particularly devastating situation that is unlikely to ever happen again. Estimations have only increased over time, with the recent figure coming from the release of new government data up to 2016. Furthermore, the cost is expected to perpetually increase for several thousand years as cleanup operations and the economic impact of the Chernobyl Exclusion Zone continue indefinitely. The most expensive natural disaster is the 2011 Tōhoku earthquake and tsunami, costing an estimated $360 billion.

== Over $1 billion ==
This table lists disasters which are estimated to have an economic cost of at least 1 billion United States dollars without taking inflation into account.

List of disasters by cost. Over $1 billion. Actual, and inflated to 2025 (unless otherwise stated)
Event	Cost ($ billion)		Fatalities	Type	Year	Nation(s)
Event	Nominal	Inflated	Fatalities	Type	Year	Nation(s)
Chernobyl disaster	$700	$2056	30 directly, ~9,000-60,000+ long-term (estimated)	Contamination (radioactive)	1986	Soviet Union ( (Ukraine) , (Belarus) , (Russia) )
2010 Northern Hemisphere heat waves	$500 (estimated)	$715.6	55,000+	Heatwave	2010	Africa, Asia, Europe and North America
2011 Tōhoku earthquake and tsunami + Fukushima nuclear disaster	$360	$515.2	19,759 (1 confirmed from radiation)	Undersea megathrust earthquake, tsunami, contamination (radioactive)	2011	Japan
2026 European heatwaves	$208 (estimated)	$208	34,210+	Heatwave	2026	(European Union) Europe
Great Hanshin earthquake	$200	$422.6	5,502–6,434	Earthquake	1995	Japan
2024 Indian heat wave	$194 (estimated)	$199.1	219+	Heatwave	2024	India
2024 North America heat waves	$162 (estimated)	$166.3	1,161+	Heatwave	2024	North and Central America ( (Mexico) , (United States) , (Guatemala) , (Honduras) , others)
2023 Turkey–Syria earthquakes	$157.8	$166.7	59,488–62,013	Earthquake	2023	West Asia (Turkey, Syria)
Sellafield radioactive releases	$154	$162.7	100 to 240	Contamination (radioactive)	1950–2023	United Kingdom
2008 Sichuan earthquake	$130	$194.4	87,587	Earthquake	2008	China
Hurricane Katrina	$125	$206.1	1,392	Tropical cyclone	2005	United States, Bahamas
Hurricane Harvey	$125	$164.2	107	Tropical cyclone	2017	Americas ( (United States) , (Mexico) , (Cayman Islands) , (Guyana) , others)
Hurricane Ian	$112	$123.2	161	Tropical cyclone	2022	North America ( (United States) , (Cuba) , (Venezuela) , others)
2020 South Asian floods	$105	$130.6	6,511	Flood	2020	South Asia ( (India) , (Pakistan) , (Bangladesh) , others)
Hurricane Maria	$91.6	$120.3	3,059	Tropical cyclone	2017	North America ( (Puerto Rico) , (Dominica) , (Guadeloupe) , others)
Hurricane Helene	$78.7	$80.8	225	Tropical cyclone	2024	North America ( (United States) , (Cuba) , (Mexico) , others)
Hurricane Ida	$75	$89.1	107	Tropical cyclone	2021	North America ( (United States) , (Cuba) , (Venezuela) , others)
2019–20 Australian bushfire season	$69	$124.4	450	Wildfire	2019–20	Australia
Hurricane Sandy	$68.7	$96.3	254	Tropical cyclone	2012	North America ( (United States) , (Haiti) , (Cuba) , others)
Hurricane Irma	$64.8	$85.1	134	Tropical cyclone	2017	North America ( (United States) , (Sint Maarten) , (Collectivity of Saint Martin) , others)
1988–1990 North American drought	$60–$79 (estimated)	$147.9–$194.7	4,800–17,000 (estimated)	Drought	1988–90	United States, Canada
Deepwater Horizon oil spill	$60–$100	$88.6–$147.6	11	Contamination (oil)	2010	United States
January 2025 Southern California wildfires	$57	$57	30	Wildfire	2025	United States
2021 European floods	$54	$64.2	243	Flood	2021	Europe ( (Germany) , (Belgium) , (Romania) , others)
2012–2013 North American drought	$49.6–$56.1	$68.6–$77.5	104	Drought	2012–13	United States, Canada
2010 China floods	$51.4	$75.9	3,189	Flood	2010	China, North Korea
1994 Northridge earthquake	$49	$106.4	57	Earthquake	1994	United States
2015 Southeast Asian haze	$47	$63.8	100,300	Wildfire, subsequent haze	2015	Southeast Asia ( (Indonesia) , (Malaysia) , (Singapore) , others)
2016 Kumamoto earthquakes	$46	$61.7	273	Earthquake	2016	Japan
2011 Thailand floods	$45.7	$65.4	815	Flood	2011	Thailand
2024 European heatwaves	$43–$126 (estimated)	$44.1 – $129.3	62,700+	Heatwave	2024	Europe ( (France) , (Italy) , (Spain) , others)
2023 South Asian floods	$41.6	$44	2,309	Flood	2023	South Asia ( (India) , (Pakistan) , (Bangladesh) , others)
2022 European heatwaves	$40.2	$44.2	~20,000/24,501 (reported); ~70,000 (estimated)	Heatwave	2022	Europe ( (France) , (Spain) , (Germany) , others)
2011 Christchurch earthquake	$40	$57.2	185	Earthquake	2011	New Zealand
2022 Pakistan floods	$40	$44	1,700	Flood	2022	Pakistan
Hurricane Ike	$38	$56.8	214	Tropical cyclone	2008	North America ( (United States) , (Haiti) , (Cuba) , others)
2024 Southeast Asia heat wave	$37–$241 (estimated)	$38–$247.3	90	Heatwave	2024	Southeast Asia ( (Indonesia) (Malaysia) , (Thailand) , others)
2023 South America heat wave	$37–$835	$39.1–$882.3	9,828 (estimated)	Heat wave	2023	South America ( (Argentina) , (Brazil) , others)
2026 Venezuela earthquakes	$37	$37	6,509-50,000	Earthquake	2026	Venezuela
2020 China floods	$32	$39.8	278	Flood	2020	China
March 2012 North American heat wave	$30 (estimated)	$42.1	4	Heatwave	2012	North America ( (United States) , (Canada) )
2012 North American heat wave	$30 (estimated)	$42.1	104	Heatwave	2012	North America ( (United States) , (Canada) )
Typhoon Doksuri	$28.5	$30.1	137	Tropical cyclone	2023	Southeast Asia ( (China) , (Philippines) , (Taiwan) , others)
2004 Chūetsu earthquake	$28	$47.7	68	Earthquake	2004	Japan
Hurricane Wilma	$27.4	$45.2	87	Tropical cyclone	2005	North America ( (United States) , (Mexico) , (Haiti) , others)
Hurricane Andrew	$27.3	$62.6	65	Tropical cyclone	1992	United States
February 13–17, 2021 North American winter storm	$26.5	$31.5	237	Winter storm, infrastructure failure (electric)	2021	North America ( (United States) , (Mexico) , (Canada) )
Hurricane Ivan	$26.1	$44.5	124	Tropical cyclone	2004	North America ( (United States) , (Grenada) , (Jamaica) , others)
Hurricane Michael	$25.1	$32.2	74	Tropical cyclone	2018	North America ( (United States) , (Cuba) , (Honduras) , others)
2018 California wildfires	$24.0	$30.8	103	Wildfire	2018	United States
2011 Sikkim earthquake	$22.3	$31.9	111	Earthquake	2011	Southern Asia ( (India) , (Nepal) , (Bangladesh) , others)
2016 China floods	$22	$29.5	449	Flood	2016	China
September 11 terrorist attacks	$21.8–$135	$39.6–$245.5	2,996	Terror attack	2001	United States
Storm Daniel	$21.1	$22.3	5,951–20,000	Tropical cyclone, dam failure	2023	Libya, Greece
2021 Henan floods	$20.9	$24.8	398 (official confirmed)	Flood	2021	China
1980 Irpinia earthquake	$20	$78.2	4,900	Earthquake	1980	Italy
2018 Northeast Asia heat wave	$20+ (estimated)	$25.6	1,000+	Heatwave	2018	North America ( (United States) , (Canada) )
Cyclone Senyar	$19.8	$19.8	1,435-2,206	Tropical cyclone	2025	Southeast Asia ( (Thailand) , (Indonesia) , (Malaysia) )
2002 European floods	$19.2	$34.4	232	Flood	2002	Central Europe ( (Czech Republic) , (Germany) , (Austria) , others)
Hurricane Laura	$19.1	$23.8	77	Tropical cyclone	2020	North America ( (United States) , (Dominican Republic) , (Haiti) , others)
Hurricane Rita	$18.5	$30.5	97–125	Tropical cyclone	2005	United States
Cyclone Lothar	$17.6	$34	140	Windstorm	1999	Western Europe ( (France) , (Germany) , (Italy) , others)
Typhoon Hagibis	$17.3	$21.8	139	Tropical cyclone	2019	Japan
Hurricane Charley	$16.9	$28.8	35	Tropical cyclone	2004	North America ( (United States) , (Jamaica) , (Cuba) )
2012 Nigeria floods	$16.9	$23.7	363	Flood	2012	Nigeria
2006 European heatwave	$16.3	$24.4	3,418	Heatwave	2006	Europe ( (France) , (Spain) , (United Kingdom) , others)
2009 L'Aquila earthquake	$16.0	$24	308	Earthquake	2009	Italy
Hurricane Otis	$16.0	$18	52 or more	Tropical cyclone	2023	Mexico
Typhoon Yagi	$15.8	$16.2	815	Tropical cyclone	2024	Southeast Asia ( (Vietnam) , (China) , (Myanmar) , (Philippines) , others)
2012 Northern Italy earthquakes	$15.8	$22.2	27	Earthquake	2012	Italy
2013 European floods	$15.6	$21.6	25	Flood	2013	Europe ( (Germany) , (Hungary) , (Czech Republic) , others)
Cyclone Amphan	$15.5	$19.3	128	Tropical cyclone	2020	Eastern South Asia ( (Bangladesh) , (Bhutan) , (India) , others)
Hurricane Matthew	$15.1	$20.3	731	Tropical cyclone	2016	North America ( (Haiti) , (United States) , (Cuba) , others)
Great Flood of 1993	$15–$20	$33.4–$44.6	47	Flood	1993	United States
Cyclones Daria, Vivian, and Wiebke	$15	$37	197	Windstorm	1990	Western Europe ( (United Kingdom) , (Germany) , (France) , others)
2004 Indian Ocean earthquake and tsunami	$15	$25.6	227,898	Earthquake, tsunami	2004	Southeast Asia ( (Indonesia) , (Sri Lanka) , (India) , others)
2010 Russian heat wave	$15	$22.1	56,000	Wildfire, heatwave	2010	Russia
October 2017 Northern California wildfires	$15	$19.7	44	Wildfire	2017	United States
1980 United States heat wave	$15–$19	$58.6–$74.2	1,250–10,000 (estimated)	Heat wave	1980	(United States)
2010 Chile earthquake	$15–$30	$22.1–$44.3	525	Earthquake	2010	Chile
2020 Beirut explosion	$15	$18.7	218	Ammonium nitrate explosion	2020	Lebanon
2024 European floods	$14.9	$15.3	337+	Flood	2024	Europe ( (Spain) , (Bosnia and Herzegovina) , (Italy) , others)
2023 Western North America heat wave	$14.8	$15.6	995	Heatwave	2023	North America ( (United States) , (Mexico) , (Canada) )
2003 European heatwave	$14.5	$25.4	72,000	Heatwave	2003	Europe ( (Italy) , (France) , (Spain) , others)
1988 Armenian earthquake	$14.2	$38.7	38,000	Earthquake	1988	Armenia (Soviet Union)
Hurricane Irene	$14.2	$20.3	58	Tropical cyclone	2011	North America ( (United States) , (Puerto Rico) , (Canada) , others)
2022 Southern Cone heat wave	$14 (estimated)	$15.4	3	Heatwave	2022	South America and Southern Cone ( (Argentina) , (Brazil) , (Paraguay) , (Uruguay) )
2023 European heatwaves	$13.4 (estimated)	$14.2	47,500–47,690	Heatwave	2023	Europe ( (Italy) , (France) , (Spain) , others)
2015 European heat wave	$13–$52 (estimated)	$17.7–$70.6	5,200–7,309	Heatwave	2015	Europe ( (France) , (Germany) , (Spain) , others)
Typhoon Jebi	$13	$16.7	21	Tropical cyclone	2018	East Asia ( (Japan) , (Taiwan) , (Russia) , others)
Cyclone Nargis	$12.9	$19.3	138,366	Tropical cyclone	2008	Myanmar
November 2015 Paris attacks	$12.7	$17.3	130	Terror attack	2015	France
2015 South India floods	$12	$16.3	506	Flood	2015	India
2019 European heatwaves	$12–13 (estimated)	$15.1 – $16.4	3,951+	Heatwave	2019	Europe ( (France) , (United Kingdom) , (Belgium) , others)
2020 Zagreb earthquake	$11.7	$14.6	1	Earthquake	2020	Croatia, Slovenia
August 2020 Midwest derecho	$11.5	$14.3	4	Derecho	2020	United States
August 2016 Central Italy earthquake	$11	$14.8	299	Earthquake	2016	Italy
2023 Emilia-Romagna floods	$11	$11.6	17	Flood	2023	Italy
2024 Spanish floods	$11	$11.3	232	Flood	2024	Spain
2025 Myanmar earthquake	$11	$11	5,456	Earthquake	2025	Indochina ( (Myanmar) , (Thailand) , (Vietnam) , others)
Typhoon Fitow	$10.4	$14.4	12	Tropical cyclone	2013	China
2011 Super Outbreak + Hackleburg–Phil Campbell and Tuscaloosa–Birmingham tornadoes	$10.2	$14.6	348	Tornado outbreak	2011	United States
2021 Western North America heat wave	$10.1	$12	1,400	Heat wave	2021	Canada, United States
2011 North American heat wave	$10–$11 (estimated)	$14.3–$15.7	22	Heatwave	2011	North America ( (United States) , (Canada) )
2016 Louisiana floods	$10–$15	$13.4–$20.1	13	Flood	2016	United States
Typhoon Mireille	$10	$23.6	64	Tropical cyclone	1991	Japan
1999 Jiji earthquake	$10	$19.3	2,415	Earthquake	1999	Taiwan
2007 Chūetsu earthquake	$10	$15.5	11	Earthquake	2007	Japan
April 2015 Nepal earthquake	$10	$13.6	8,964	Earthquake	2015	Southern Asia ( (Nepal) , (India) , (China) , others)
Cyclone Kyrill	$10	$15.5	44	Windstorm	2007	Western Europe ( (United Kingdom) , (France) , (Germany) , others)
June 2008 Midwest floods	$10	$15	16	Flood	2008	United States
1976 Tangshan earthquake	$10	$56.6	242,419–655,000	Earthquake	1976	China
Typhoon Faxai	$10	$12.6	3	Tropical cyclone	2019	Japan, Wake Island
2014 Ludian earthquake	$9.91	$13.5	615–727	Earthquake	2014	China
2018 Japan floods	$9.86 (official estimated)	$12.4	238 (official confirmed)	Flood	2018	Japan
Hurricane Frances	$9.8	$16.7	50	Tropical cyclone	2004	North America ( (United States) , (The Bahamas) )
2026 Colombia earthquake	$9.6	$9.6	329	Earthquake	2026	South America ( (Colombia) , (Ecuador) , (Panama) )
Hurricane Hugo	$9.5	$24.7	60	Tropical cyclone	1989	North America ( (United States) , (Puerto Rico) , (Guadeloupe) , others)
Hurricane Georges	$9.4	$18.6	604	Tropical cyclone	1998	North America ( (Puerto Rico) , (United States) , (Dominican Republic) , others)
2022 North American heat waves	$9.3 (estimated)	$10.2	117	Heatwave	2022	North America ( United States, (Mexico) , (Canada) )
Typhoon Lekima	$9.28	$11.7	105	Tropical cyclone	2019	Southeast Asia ( (China) , (Philippines) , (Malaysia) , others)
Cyclone Gabrielle	$9.2	$9.7	11	Tropical cyclone	2023	New Zealand
2022 Nigeria floods	$9.12	$10	612	Flood	2022	Nigeria
Tropical Storm Allison	$9	$16.4	55	Tropical cyclone	2001	United States, Canada
Typhoon Songda	$9	$15.3	28	Tropical cyclone	2004	Japan
2022 Fukushima earthquake	$8.8	$9.7	4	Earthquake	2022	Japan
1999 İzmit earthquake	$8.5	$16.4	17,127–18,373	Earthquake	1999	Turkey
Hurricane Gustav	$8.3	$12.4	153	Tropical cyclone	2008	North America ( (United States) , (Cuba) , (Haiti) , others)
Hurricane Eta	$8.3	$10.3	189	Tropical cyclone	2020	Caribbean basin ( (Honduras) , (Guatemala) , (Mexico) , others)
Storm Kristin	$8.3	$8.3	15	Extratropical cyclone	2026	Portugal Spain
2010 Haiti earthquake	$8.1–$14	$12–$20.7	100,000–220,000	Earthquake	2010	Haiti
Cyclone Fani	$8.1	$10.2	89	Tropical cyclone	2019	India, Bangladesh
1990 Manjil–Rudbar earthquake	$8	$19.7	45,000	Earthquake	1990	Iran
2017 Puebla earthquake	$8	$10.5	370	Earthquake	2017	Mexico
Hurricane Jeanne	$7.9	$13.5	3,035	Tropical cyclone	2004	North America ( (Haiti) , (United States) , (Dominican Republic) , others)
2016 Fort McMurray wildfire	$7.61	$10.2	2	Wildfire	2016	Canada
2022 China heat wave	$7.6	$8.4	50,900	Heatwave	2022	China
2023 Slovenia floods	$7.6	$8	7	Flood	2023	Julian Alps ( (Slovenia) , (Austria) , (Croatia) )
2001 Gujarat earthquake	$7.5	$13.6	20,023	Earthquake	2001	India, Pakistan
2021 Pacific Northwest floods	$7.5	$8.9	5	Flood	2021	Canada, United States
2024 Noto earthquake	>$7.4 (estimated)	>$7.6	705	Earthquake	2024	Japan
Hurricane Sally	$7.3	$9.1	5	Tropical cyclone	2020	United States
Tornado outbreak sequence of May 19–27, 2024	$7.3	$7.5	31	Tornado outbreak	2024	United States
Typhoon Rammasun	$7.13	$9.7	196	Tropical cyclone	2014	Southeast Asia ( (Philippines) , (Vietnam) , (China) , others)
2023 Al Haouz earthquake	$7	$7.4	2,960	Earthquake	2023	Morocco
Exxon Valdez oil spill	$7	$18.2	0	Contamination (oil)	1989	North America ( (United States) , (Canada) )
Typhoon Nina + 1975 Banqiao Dam failure	$6.7	$40.1	229,000	Tropical cyclone, dam failure	1975	China, Taiwan
Hurricane Floyd	$6.5	$12.6	74	Tropical cyclone	1999	North America ( (United States) , (The Bahamas) , (Canada) )
2007 United Kingdom floods	$6.5	$10.1	13	Flood	2007	UK
Typhoon Hato	$6.41	$8.4	24	Tropical cyclone	2017	Southeast Asia ( (China) , (Macau) , (Vietnam) , others)
Space Shuttle Columbia disaster	$6.4	$11.2	7	Space flight accident	2003	United States
Typhoon Saomai-Osang	$6.3	$11.5	28	Tropical cyclone	2000	East Asia ( (Japan) , (Russia) , (South Korea) )
Black Saturday bushfires	$6.3	$9.5	173	Wildfire	2009	Australia
2017 Iran–Iraq earthquake	$6.2	$8.1	630	Earthquake	2017	Iran, Iraq
Typhoon Morakot	$6.2	$9.3	789	Tropical cyclone	2009	Southeast Asia ( (Taiwan) , (China) , (Philippines) , others)
Hurricane Beryl	$6.2	$6.4	70	Tropical cyclone	2024	Caribbean basin ( (United States) , (Grenada) , (Saint Vincent and the Grenadines) , (Venezuela) , others)
Hurricane Mitch	$6.1	$12	11,374+	Tropical cyclone	1998	North America ( (Honduras) , (Nicaragua) , (Guatemala) , others)
Cyclone Xynthia	$6.1	$9	75	Windstorm	2010	Western Europe ( (France) , (Spain) , (Portugal) , others)
2020 Petrinja earthquake	$6.1	$7.6	7	Earthquake	2020	Balkans ( (Croatia) , (Bosnia and Herzegovina) , (Slovenia) , others)
Tornado outbreak of May 6–10, 2024	$6.1	$6.3	6	Tornado outbreak	2024	United States
1989 Loma Prieta earthquake	$6	$15.6	63	Earthquake	1989	United States
Typhoon Prapiroon	$6	$11.2	75	Tropical cyclone	2000	Northeast Asia ( (China) , (South Korea) , (Japan) , others)
Northeast blackout of 2003	$6	$10.5	11	Infrastructure failure (electric)	2003	United States, Canada
Cyclone Klaus	$6	$9	26	Windstorm	2009	Southeastern Europe ( (France) , (Spain) , (Italy) , others)
2013 Alberta floods	$6	$8.3	5	Flood	2013	Canada
Typhoon Shanshan	$6	$6.2	8	Tropical cyclone	2024	Japan, South Korea
Tornado outbreak of March 31 – April 1, 2023	$5.7	$6	33	Tornado outbreak	2023	United States
2020 Kyushu floods	$5.67	$7.1	77	Flood	2020	Japan
Cyclone Gudrun	$5.5	$9.1	24	Windstorm	2005	North Europe ( (United Kingdom) , (Denmark) , (Sweden) , others)
Hurricane Isabel	$5.5	$9.6	51	Tropical cyclone	2003	United States
1993 Storm of the Century	$5.5	$12.3	270	Winter storm	1993	United States
2023 Hawaii wildfires	$5.5	$5.8	102	Wildfire	2023	United States
2024 Australia heat wave	$5.4–$8.1 (estimated)	$5.5–$8.3	0	Heatwave	2024	Australia
2006 North American heat wave	$5.3	$8.5	225	Heatwave	2006	North America ( (United States) , (Canada) )
2005 Kashmir earthquake	$5.2	$8.6	86,000–87,351	Earthquake	2005	Pakistan, India
1980 El Asnam earthquake	$5.2	$20.3	5,000	Earthquake	1980	Algeria
Hurricane Dorian	$5.1	$6.4	84	Tropical cyclone	2019	North America ( (The Bahamas) , (United States) , (Canada) , others)
1931 China floods	$5.07	$107.3	422,499–4,000,000	Flood	1931	China
1985 Mexico City earthquake	$5	$15	10,000–35,000	Earthquake	1985	Mexico
Typhoon Herb	$5	$10.3	284–590	Tropical cyclone	1996	East Asia ( (China) , (Taiwan) , (Japan) )
2003 Boumerdès earthquake	$5	$8.8	2,266	Earthquake	2003	Algeria
2010 eruptions of Eyjafjallajökull	$5	$7.4	0	Volcanic eruption	2010	Iceland, Northern Hemisphere (ash cloud only)
Tropical Storm Imelda	$5	$6.3	5	Tropical cyclone	2019	United States
2025 Tibet earthquake	$5	$5	126	Earthquake	2025	Southern Asia ( (China) , (Nepal) , (India) )
2019 Karnataka floods	$4.95	$6.2	61	Flood	2019	India
2001 eastern North America heat wave	$4.8+	$9	95	Heat wave	2001	United States
2014 Southeast Europe floods	$4.8	$6.5	86	Flood	2014	Southeast Europe ( (Serbia) , (Bosnia and Herzegovina) , (Croatia) , others)
2018 Kerala floods	$4.8	$6.2	483	Flood	2018	India
2021–2022 Malaysian floods	$4.77	$5.2	54	Flood	2022	Malaysia
Hurricane Opal	$4.7	$9.9	63	Tropical cyclone	1995	North America ( (Mexico) , (Guatemala) , (United States) , others)
1997 Umbria and Marche earthquake	$4.67	$9.4	11	Earthquake	1997	Italy
Typhoon Haiyan	$4.6	$6.4	6,329–7,403	Tropical cyclone	2013	Southeast Asia ( (Philippines) , (China) , (Taiwan) , others)
2022–2023 California floods	$4.6	$4.9	22	Flood	2022–23	United States
1979 Montenegro earthquake	$4.5	$20	136	Earthquake	1979	Yugoslavia ( (Montenegro) , (Albania) , (Croatia) )
1997 Central European flood	$4.5	$9	114	Flood	1997	Central Europe ( (Czech Republic) , (Poland) , (Germany) )
1997 Indonesian forest fires + 1997 Southeast Asian haze + Garuda Indonesia Flight 152	$4.47	$9	240	Wildfire, subsequent haze and plane crash	1997	Southeast Asia ( (Indonesia) , (Philippines) , (Malaysia) , others)
1999 Odisha cyclone	$4.44	$8.6	9,887	Tropical cyclone	1999	South Asia ( (India) , (Myanmar) , (Bangladesh) , others)
2020 Sudan floods	$4.43	$5.5	100	Flood	2020	Sudan
Cyclone Gonu	$4.42	$6.9	78	Tropical cyclone	2007	Oman, Iran
Hurricane Zeta	$4.4	$5.5	9	Tropical cyclone	2020	North America and the Antiles ( (United States) , (Jamaica) , (Mexico) , others)
Typhoon Mawar	$4.3	$4.5	6	Tropical cyclone	2023	West Pacific basin ( (Japan) , (Guam) , (Taiwan) , others)
Cyclone Phailin	$4.26	$5.9	46	Tropical cyclone	2013	South Asia ( (India) , (Nepal) , (Myanmar) , others)
1999 Athens earthquake	$4.2	$8.1	143	Earthquake	1999	Greece
Typhoon Rusa	$4.2	$7.5	238	Tropical cyclone	2002	East Asia ( (South Korea) , (Japan) , (North Korea) , others)
Hurricane Manuel	$4.2	$5.8	123	Tropical cyclone	2013	Mexico
Tornado outbreak sequence of May 2003	$4.1	$7.2	42	Tornado	2003	United States
2019 Iran floods	$4.1	$5.2	77	Flood	2019	Iran
Great Storm of 1987	$4	$11.3	22	Windstorm	1987	Western Europe ( (United Kingdom) , (France) , (Spain) , others)
2000 Southern United States heat wave	$4	$7.5	140	Heat wave	2000	United States
2017 Chiapas earthquake	$4	$5.3	98	Earthquake	2017	Mexico, Guatemala
2018 European heatwave	$4–$8.9 (estimated)	$5.1–$11.4	80	Heatwave	2018	Europe ( (France) , (Italy) , (Spain) , others)
Hurricane Dennis	$3.98	$6.6	88	Tropical cyclone	2005	North America and the Antiles ( (Haiti) , (Cuba) , (United States) , others)
1983 Spanish floods	$3.9	$12.6	34	Flood	1983	Spain
Hurricane Stan	$3.9	$6.4	1,673	Tropical cyclone	2005	Central America ( (Guatemala) , (Mexico) , (El Salvador) , others)
Hurricane Karl	$3.9	$5.8	22	Tropical cyclone	2010	Mexico, Belize
Tornado outbreak of December 10–11, 2021	$3.9	$4.6	90	Tornado	2021	United States
Cyclone Chido	$3.9	$4	172+	Cyclone	2024	South-west Africa ( (Mozambique) , (Mayotte) , (Malawi) , others)
2018 North American heat wave	$3.8 (estimated)	$4.9	70+	Heatwave	2018	North Asia ( (Japan) , (South Korea) , (North Korea) , (China) , (Mongolia) )
Typhoon Mangkhut	$3.74	$4.8	134	Tropical cyclone	2018	Southeast Asia ( (Philippines) , (China) , (Taiwan) , others)
2024 Rio Grande do Sul floods	$3.7	$3.8	181	Flood	2024	Brazil, Uruguay
Hurricane Isabel	$3.6	$6.3	51	Tropical cyclone	2003	North America and the Antiles ( (United States) , (Canada) , (The Bahamas) , others)
Cyclone Yasi	$3.6	$4.6	7	Tropical cyclone	2011	Australia
Cyclone Hudhud	$3.58	$4.9	124	Tropical cyclone	2014	India, Nepal
Typhoon Utor	$3.55	$4.9	97	Tropical cyclone	2013	China, Philippines
Cyclone Matmo–Bulbul	$3.54	$4.5	43	Tropical cyclone	2019	South Asia ( (Bangladesh) , (India) , (Vietnam) , others)
Vargas tragedy	$3.5	$6.8	10,000–30,000	Flood, landslide and mudflow	1999	Venezuela
2016 Kaikōura earthquake	$3.5	$4.7	2	Earthquake	2016	New Zealand
Hurricane Idalia	$3.5	$3.7	12	Tropical cyclone	2023	North America ( (United States) , (Bermuda) , (Mexico) , others)
Cyclone Vardah	$3.37	$4.5	47	Tropical cyclone	2016	Indian Ocean basin ( (India) , (Thailand) , (Somalia) , others)
2022 eastern Australia floods	$3.33	$3.7	27	Flood	2022	Australia
Hurricane Luis	$3.3	$7	19	Tropical cyclone	1995	North America and the Antiles ( (Sint Maarten) , (Antigua and Barbuda) , (Dominica) , others)
2018 Hokkaido Eastern Iburi earthquake	$3.3	$4.2	41	Earthquake	2018	Japan
1976 Çaldıran–Muradiye earthquake	$3.2	$18.1	5,000	Earthquake	1976	Turkey, Iran
Space Shuttle Challenger disaster	$3.2	$9.4	7	Space flight accident	1986	United States
Typhoon Winnie	$3.2	$6.4	372	Tropical cyclone	1997	East Asia ( (China) , (Taiwan) , (Philippines) , others)
2010 Central European floods	$3.14	$4.6	37	Flood	2010	Central Europe ( (Poland) , (Austria) , (Czech Republic) , others)
Hurricane Isaac	$3.11	$4.4	41	Tropical cyclone	2012	North America and the Antiles ( (Haiti) , (United States) , (Dominican Republic) , others)
1976 Moro Gulf earthquake	$3.1	$17.5	8,000	Earthquake	1976	Philippines
Hurricane Iniki	$3.1	$7.1	6	Tropical cyclone	1992	United States
2006 Yogyakarta earthquake	$3.1	$5	5,749	Earthquake	2006	Indonesia
2019–20 Puerto Rico earthquakes	$3.1	$3.9	4	Earthquake	2020	Puerto Rico
2023 Canadian wildfires	$3.1	$3.3	8	Wildfire	2023	Canada, United States
Hurricane Delta	$3.09	$3.8	6	Tropical cyclone	2020	North and Central America ( (United States) , (Mexico) , (Jamaica) , others)
Hurricane Fiona	$3.09	$3.4	29	Tropical cyclone	2022	North America ( (Puerto Rico) , (Canada) , (Dominican Republic) , others)
1964 Niigata earthquake	$3.0	$31.1	36	Earthquake	1964	Japan
Hurricane Alicia	$3.0	$9.7	21	Tropical cyclone	1983	United States
Hurricane Gilbert	$3.0	$8.2	318	Tropical cyclone	1988	North America ( (Mexico) , (Jamaica) , (Haiti) , others)
2016 Ecuador earthquake	$3.0	$4	676	Earthquake	2016	Latin America ( (Ecuador) , (Colombia) , (Peru) )
2019 Arkansas River floods	$3.0	$3.8	5	Flood	2019	United States
Cyclone Yaas	$2.99	$3.6	20	Tropical cyclone	2021	South Asia ( (India) , (Bangladesh) , (Nepal) , others)
June 2012 North American derecho	$2.9	$4.1	22	Derecho	2012	United States
2019 Midwestern U.S. floods	$2.9	$3.7	3	Flood	2019	United States
Tropical Storm Lee	$2.8	$4	18	Tropical cyclone	2011	United States
2011 Joplin tornado	$2.8	$4	158	Tornado	2011	United States
Cyclone Debbie	$2.73	$3.6	14	Tropical cyclone	2017	Australia, New Zealand
AZF chemical plant explosion	$2.68	$4.9	29	Explosion	2001	France
2010 Canterbury earthquake	$2.63	$3.9	2	Earthquake	2010	New Zealand
1989 Newcastle earthquake	$2.6	$6.8	13	Earthquake	1989	Australia
Tornado outbreak sequence of May 2019	$2.5	$3.1	8	Tornado	2019	United States
2017 Montana wildfires	$2.5	$3.3	2	Drought, wildfire	2017	United States
2017 Minneapolis hailstorm	$2.5	$3.3	0	Hailstorm	2017	United States
2018 British Isles heatwave	$2.5 (estimated)	$3.2	785	Heatwave	2018	United Kingdom, Ireland
Hurricane John	$2.5	$2.6	29	Tropical cyclone	2024	Mexico
2024 Hualien earthquake	$2.5	$2.6	19	Earthquake	2024	Eastern Asia ( (Taiwan) , (Japan) , (China) )
Hurricane Michelle	$2.43	$4.4	48	Tropical cyclone	2001	North and Central America ( (Honduras) , (Nicaragua) , (Cuba) , others)
Severe weather sequence of July 13–16, 2024	$2.4	$2.5	5	Derecho, tornado outbreak, flood	2024	United States
Typhoon Gaemi	$2.31	$2.4	126	Tropical cyclone	2024	Southeast Asia ( (China) , (Philippines) , (Vietnam) , others)
2026 United Kingdom heatwaves	$2.4 (estimated)	$2.4	2,700+	Heatwave	2026	UK
Cyclone Sidr	$2.3	$3.6	15,000	Tropical cyclone	2007	Southern Asia ( (Bangladesh) , (India) , (China) , others)
2010 Tennessee floods (Nashville)	$2.3	$3.4	26	Flash flood	2010	United States (Tennessee, Kentucky, Mississippi)
2009 Sumatra earthquakes	$2.3	$3.5	1,115	Earthquake	2009	Indonesia
Typhoon Matsa	$2.23	$3.7	25	Tropical cyclone	2005	East Asia ( (China) , (Taiwan) , (Japan) , others)
2022 Luding earthquake	$2.23	$2.5	93	Earthquake	2022	China
Storm Ciarán	$2.22	$2.3	21	Windstorm	2023	Europe ( (Italy) , (France) , (Belgium) , others)
2017 Denver hailstorm	$2.2	$2.9	0	Hailstorm	2017	United States
2011 Van earthquakes	$2.2	$3.1	642	Earthquake	2011	Turkey
Cyclone Mocha	$2.2	$2.3	463–564	Tropical cyclone	2023	Southern Asia ( (Myanmar) , (Bangladesh) , (India) , (Sri Lanka) , others)
Cyclone Roanu	$2.13	$2.9	135	Tropical cyclone	2016	South Asia ( (Sri Lanka) , (Bangladesh) , (India) , others)
Hurricane Agnes	$2.1	$16.2	128	Tropical cyclone	1972	North America and the Antiles ( (United States) , (Cuba) , (Canada) , others)
Cyclones BOB 03 and Yemyin	$2.1	$3.3	983	Tropical cyclone	2007	South Asia ( (Pakistan) , (India) , (Afghanistan) )
Tornado outbreak of March 6–7, 2017	$2.1	$2.8	0	Tornado	2017	United States
2021 eastern Australia floods	$2.1	$2.5	5	Flood	2021	Australia
Cyclone Komen	$2.06	$2.8	167	Tropical cyclone	2015	South Asia ( (India) , (Bangladesh) , (Myanmar) )
2023 Jishishan earthquake	$2.05	$2.2	151	Earthquake	2023	China
Typhoon In-fa	$2.04	$2.4	6	Tropical cyclone	2021	East Asia ( (Philippines) , (China) , (Japan) , others)
Teton Dam disaster	$2	$11.3	11	Dam failure	1976	United States
1977 Vrancea earthquake	$2	$10.6	1,700	Earthquake	1977	Black Sea basin ( (Romania) , (Bulgaria) , (Moldova) , others)
Hurricane Joan–Miriam	$2	$5.4	337	Tropical cyclone	1988	Central and South America ( (Nicaragua) , (Costa Rica) , (Colombia) , others)
1999 Colombia earthquake	$2	$3.9	1,900–5,800	Earthquake	1999	Colombia
December Storm	$2	$3.9	20	Windstorm	1999	Central Europe ( (Denmark) , (Sweden) , (Germany) )
2001 Nisqually earthquake	$2	$3.6	1	Earthquake	2001	United States
2007 European heatwave	$2 (estimated)	$3.1	500+	Heatwave	2007	Europe ( (Greece) , (Italy) , (Croatia) , others)
2007 Asian heat wave	$2 (estimated)	$3.1	923	Heatwave	2007	Asia ( (India) , (Bangladesh) , (Nepal) , others)
Costa Concordia disaster	$2	$2.8	33	Maritime disaster	2012	Italy
2013 Moore tornado	$2	$2.8	26	Tornado	2013	United States
2022 Afghanistan floods	$2	$2.2	670	Flood	2022	Afghanistan
2022 European and Mediterranean wildfires	$2.6 (estimated)	$3	41	Wildfire	2022	Europe ( (Spain) , (Algeria) , (Morocco) , others)
2024 Pakistan heat wave	$2 (estimated)	$2.1	568+	Heatwave	2024	(Pakistan)
2024 Persian Gulf floods	$2	$2.1	46	Flood	2024	Persian Gulf basin ( (Oman) , (Iran) , (United Arab Emirates) , others)
Hurricane Debby	$2	$2.1	10	Tropical cyclone	2024	North America and Antiles ( (United States) , (Canada) , (The Bahamas) , others)
2003 Tokachi earthquake	$1.9	$3.3	1	Earthquake	2003	Japan
Francis Scott Key Bridge collapse	$1.9	$1.9	6	Bridge collapse	2024	United States
Cyclone Aila	$1.83	$2.7	339	Tropical cyclone	2009	Bangladesh, India
Typhoon Hinnamnor	$1.81	$2	20	Tropical cyclone	2022	East Asia ( (South Korea) , (Russia) , (Japan) , others)
Hurricane Fifi	$1.8	$11.8	8,210	Tropical cyclone	1974	Central America ( (Honduras) , (Guatemala) , (Belize) , others)
2011 Groundhog Day blizzard	$1.8	$2.6	36	Winter storm	2011	North America ( (United States) , (Canada) , (Mexico) )
2023 North India floods	$1.8	$1.9	422	Flood	2023	India
Hurricane David	$1.79	$7.9	2,078	Tropical cyclone	1979	North America and the Antiles ( (Dominican Republic) , (Dominica) , (United States) , others)
Hurricane Frederic	$1.77	$7.9	12	Tropical cyclone	1979	North America and the Antiles ( (United States) , (Cuba) , (Puerto Rico) , others)
Cyclone Jal	$1.73	$2.6	118	Tropical cyclone	2010	South and Southeast Asia ( (Thailand) , (India) , (Malaysia) , others)
2018 Sulawesi earthquake and tsunami	$1.71	$2.2	4,340 (confirmed)	Earthquake and tsunami	2018	Indonesia
Piper Alpha explosion	$1.7	$4.7	165	Explosion (oil rig)	1988	United Kingdom
1991 Bangladesh cyclone	$1.7	$4	138,866	Tropical cyclone	1991	Southern Asia ( (Bangladesh) , (India) , (China) , others)
Deep Depression ARB 02	$1.64	$2.5	180	Tropical cyclone	2008	Yemen
Typhoon Man-yi	$1.62	$2.2	6	Tropical cyclone	2013	Japan
2016 Kaikōura earthquake	$1.62	$2.2	2	Earthquake	2016	New Zealand
2001 El Salvador earthquakes	$1.6	$2.9	1,259	Earthquake	2001	Latin America ( (El Salvador) , (Guatemala) , (Honduras) )
2007 Greek forest fires	$1.6–$3 (estimated)	$2.5 – $4.7	85	Wildfire	2007	Greece
Hurricane Dolly	$1.6	$2.4	22	Tropical cyclone	2008	North and Central America ( (Guatemala) , (United States) , (Mexico) , others)
2013 Lushan earthquake	$1.6	$2.2	216	Earthquake	2013	China
2021 Haiti earthquake	$1.6	$1.9	2,248	Earthquake	2021	Haiti
Hurricane Allen	$1.57	$6.1	269	Tropical cyclone	1980	North America ( (United States) , (Mexico) , (Jamaica) , (Haiti) , others)
2020 Central Vietnam floods	$1.57	$2	233	Flood	2020	Indochina ( (Vietnam) , (Cambodia) < (Laos) )
Cyclone Tauktae	$1.57	$1.9	174	Tropical cyclone	2021	South Asia ( (India) , (Pakistan) , (Sri Lanka) , others)
2022 KwaZulu-Natal floods	$1.57	$1.7	436	Flood	2022	South Africa
2020 Elazığ earthquake	$1.56	$1.9	41	Earthquake	2020	Turkey
2019 Dallas tornado	$1.55	$2	0	Tornado	2019	United States
Cyclone Freddy	$1.53	$1.6	1,434	Tropical cyclone	2023	Southern Africa ( (Malawi) , (Mozambique) , (Madagascar) , others)
Autumn 2000 Western Europe floods	$1.52	$2.8	20	Flood	2000	Western Europe ( (United Kingdom) , (France) , (Italy) , others)
Hurricane Juan	$1.5	$4.5	12	Tropical cyclone	1985	United States, Canada
Hurricane Bob	$1.5	$3.5	17	Tropical cyclone	1991	North Atlantic Ocean ( (United States) , (Canada) , (Portugal) )
1992 Erzincan earthquake	$1.5	$3.4	950	Earthquake	1992	Turkey
2003 Bam earthquake	$1.5	$2.6	34,000	Earthquake	2003	Iran
Typhoon Talim	$1.5	$2.5	172	Tropical cyclone	2005	Southeast Asia ( (China) , (Taiwan) , (Philippines) )
Hurricane Ingrid	$1.5	$2.1	32	Tropical cyclone	2013	Mexico, United States
2015 Indian heat wave	$1.5 (estimated)	$2	2,500+	Heatwave	2015	India
Cyclone Mekunu	$1.5	$1.9	31	Tropical cyclone	2018	Arabian Peninsula ( (Yemen) , (Oman) , (Saudi Arabia) )
Brumadinho dam disaster	$1.5	$1.9	270	Dam failure	2019	Brazil
Typhoon Hagupit	$1.5	$1.9	17	Tropical cyclone	2020	East Asia ( (South Korea) , (China) , (Taiwan) , others)
Hurricane Francine	$1.5	$1.5	0	Tropical cyclone	2024	United States, Mexico
Typhoon Jongdari	$1.48	$1.9	0	Tropical cyclone	2018	Japan, China
Tropical Storm Etau (2009)	$1.44	$2.2	28	Tropical cyclone	2009	Japan
2026 Mindanao earthquake	$1.44	$1.4	95	Earthquake	2026	Philippines, Indonesia
2023 Auckland Anniversary Weekend floods	$1.43	$1.5	4	Flood	2023	New Zealand
Hurricane Camille	$1.42	$12.5	259	Tropical cyclone	1969	North America and the Antiles ( (United States) , (Cuba) , (Mexico) , others)
2020 Nashville tornado	$1.418	$1.8	5	Tornado	2020	United States
Cyclone Winston	$1.4	$1.9	44	Tropical cyclone	2016	Fiji
Cyclone Idai	$1.4	$1.8	1,593	Tropical cyclone	2019	Southern Africa ( (Mozambique) , (Zimbabwe) , (Malawi) , others)
Hurricane Iota	$1.4	$1.7	84	Tropical cyclone	2020	Latin America ( (Honduras) , (Colombia) , others)
2021 Cumbre Vieja volcanic eruption	$1.4	$1.7	1	Volcanic eruption	2021	Spain
2009 Messina floods and mudslides	$1.39	$2.1	31	Flood and mudslides	2009	Italy
Hurricane Elena	$1.3	$3.9	9	Tropical cyclone	1985	United States, Cuba
1993 Latur earthquake	$1.3	$2.9	9,748	Earthquake	1993	India
Tropical Storm Fred	$1.3	$1.5	7	Tropical cyclone	2021	North America and the Antiles ( (United States) , (Dominican Republic) , (Haiti) , others)
2021 Fukushima earthquake	$1.3	$1.5	1	Earthquake	2021	Japan
2022 United Kingdom heatwaves	$1.3–$1.5 (estimated)	$1.4 – $1.7	4,507	Heatwave	2022	United Kingdom)
Hurricane Isidore	$1.28	$2.3	22	Tropical cyclone	2002	North and Central America ( (Mexico) , (United States) , (Cuba) , others)
2011 European floods	$1.25	$1.8	17	Flood	2011	Europe and North Africa ( (Italy) , (France) , (Republic of Ireland) , others)
Hurricane Odile	$1.25	$1.7	18	Tropical cyclone	2014	Mexico, United States
Cedar Fire	$1.24–$2	$2.2 – $3.5	15	Wildfire	2003	United States
2020 Hyderabad floods	$1.23	$1.5	98	Flood	2020	India
2020 Calgary hailstorm	$1.2–$1.4	$1.5 – $1.7	0	Hailstorm	2020	Canada
1965 Palm Sunday tornado outbreak	$1.217	$12.4	266	Tornado outbreak	1965	United States
1996 Oman cyclone	$1.2	$2.5	341	Tropical cyclone	1996	Arabian Sea basin ( (Oman) , (Yemen) , (Somalia) )
January 2011 Rio de Janeiro floods and mudslides	$1.2	$1.7	916	Flood, mudslides	2011	Brazil
Angry Summer	$1.2 (estimated)	$1.7	0	Heatwave	2012–13	Australia
Cyclone Veronica	$1.2	$1.5	0	Tropical cyclone	2019	Australia, East Timor
2021 Fukushima earthquake	$1.2	$1.4	3	Earthquake	2021	Japan
Hurricane Elsa	$1.2	$1.4	13	Tropical cyclone	2021	North America and the Antiles ( (Cuba) , (Dominican Republic) , (Martinique) , others)
July–August 2022 United States floods	$1.2	$1.3	44	Flood	2022	United States
2023 São Paulo floods and landslides	$1.2	$1.3	65	Flood, landslide	2023	Brazil
2024 Houston derecho	$1.2	$1.2	8	Derecho	2024	United States
Typhoon Fred	$1.18	$2.6	3,063	Tropical cyclone	1994	East Asia ( (China) , (Taiwan) , (Japan) )
Typhoon Haitang	$1.17	$1.9	20	Tropical cyclone	2005	East Asia ( (China) , (Taiwan) , (Japan) )
2010 Baja California earthquake	$1.15	$1.7	4	Earthquake	2010	Mexico, United States
Cyclone Ita	$1.15	$1.6	40	Tropical cyclone	2014	Oceania ( (Solomon Islands) , (Australia) , (New Zealand) , others)
Typhoon Bopha	$1.1	$1.5	1,901	Tropical cyclone	2012	Philippines
Three Mile Island accident	$1.1	$4.9	0	Contamination (radiation)	1979	United States
1980 eruption of Mount St. Helens	$1.1	$4.3	57	Volcanic eruption, subsequent landslides and mudslides	1980	United States
Tropical Storm Agatha	$1.1	$1.6	204	Tropical cyclone	2010	Central America ( (Mexico) , (Guatemala) , (El Salvador) , others)
2013 North India floods	$1.1	$1.5	6,054	Flood	2013	India, Nepal
May 2021 South Central United States flooding	$1.1	$1.3	5	Flood	2021	United States
Hurricane Nicholas	$1.1	$1.3	4	Tropical cyclone	2021	United States, Mexico
East Palestine, Ohio, train derailment	$1.1	$1.2	0	Contamination (hazardous materials)	2023	United States
2019 Albania earthquake	$1.09	$1.4	51	Earthquake	2019	Albania
2015 Tianjin explosions	$1.08 (official estimated)	$1.5	173 (official confirmed)	Explosion	2015	China
Typhoon Vamco	$1.06	$1.3	102	Tropical cyclone	2020	Southeast Asia ( (Philippines) , (Vietnam) , others)
Cyclone Garance	$1.05	$1.1	5	Tropical cyclone	2025	Southwest Indian Ocean ( (Réunion) , (Madagascar) , (Mauritius) )
Tropical Storm Alberto	$1.03	$2.2	33	Tropical cyclone	1994	United States
Typhoon Damrey	$1.03	$1.4	142	Tropical cyclone	2017	Southeast Asia ( (Vietnam) , (Philippines) , (Cambodia) , others)
1923 Great Kantō earthquake	$1	$18.9	142,800	Earthquake	1923	Japan
1948 Fukui earthquake	$1	$13.4	3,769	Earthquake	1948	Japan
Vajont Dam disaster	$1	$10.5	2,500	Landslide, subsequent megatsunami and dam failure	1963	Italy
1963 Skopje earthquake	$1	$10.5	1,100	Earthquake	1963	North Macedonia (Yugoslavia)
1972 Nicaragua earthquake	$1	$7.7	10,000	Earthquake	1972	Nicaragua
1976 Guatemala earthquake	$1	$5.7	23,000	Earthquake	1976	Guatemala, Belize
Typhoon Ketsana	$1	$1.5	921	Tropical cyclone	2009	Southeast Asia ( (Philippines) , (Vietnam) , (Cambodia) , (Laos) )
Armero tragedy	$1	$3	22,540	Volcano eruption, mudslides	1985	Colombia
Surfside condominium collapse	$1	$1.2	98	Structure failure	2021	United States
1978 Thessaloniki earthquake	$1	$4.9	50	Earthquake	1978	Greece, (Socialist Federal Republic of Yugoslavia) Yugoslavia, Bulgaria
1983 Sea of Japan earthquake	$1	$3.2	104	Earthquake	1983	Japan
1985 Algarrobo earthquake	$1	$3	177	Earthquake	1985	Chile
1987 Ecuador earthquakes	$1	$2.8	1,000–5,000	Earthquake	1987	Ecuador
1988 Nepal earthquake	$1	$2.7	709	Earthquake	1988	Nepal, India
1992 Cairo earthquake	$1	$2.3	561	Earthquake	1992	Egypt
1994 Páez River earthquake	$1	$2.2	1,100	Earthquake	1994	Colombia
1998 Adana–Ceyhan earthquake	$1	$2	145	Earthquake	1998	Turkey
1999 Düzce earthquake	$1	$1.9	845–894	Earthquake	1999	Turkey
1999 Bridge Creek–Moore tornado	$1	$1.9	41	Tornado	1999	United States
2014 South Napa earthquake	$1	$1.4	1	Earthquake	2014	United States
2016 Indian heat wave	$1 (estimated)	$1.3	1,111	Heatwave	2016	India
Cyclone Luban	$1	$1.3	14	Tropical cyclone	2018	Arabian Sea basin ( (Yemen) , (Oman) , (Somalia) )
Hurricane Nicole	$1	$1.1	11	Tropical cyclone	2022	North America and the Antiles ( (Dominican Republic) , (United States) , (The Bahamas) , others)
2024 Chile wildfires	$1	$1	137–507	Wildfire	2024	Chile

== Under $1 billion ==
This table lists notable disasters which are estimated to have an economic cost of less than 1 billion United States dollars without taking inflation into account. This includes historical disasters, such as the Great Chicago Fire, which would surpass the value of $1 billion in modern currency.

Note: All damage figures are listed in millions of United States dollars.

List of disasters by cost. Under $1 billion. Actual, and inflated to 2025 (unless otherwise stated)
Event	Cost ($ millions)		Fatalities	Type	Year	Nation(s)
Event	Nominal	Inflated	Fatalities	Type	Year	Nation(s)
Cyclone Akash	$982	$1525	14	Tropical cyclone	2007	South Asia ( (Bangladesh) , (Myanmar) , (India) )
2013 Washington, Illinois tornado	$935	$1292	3	Tornado	2013	United States
2016 Great Smoky Mountains wildfires	$922	$1237	14	Wildfire	2016	United States
Daulatpur–Saturia tornado	$1.5	$4	1,300	Tornado	1989	Bangladesh
2020 Korea floods	$875	$1089	32	Flood	2020	South Korea
2012–13 North American winter	$850	$1175	69	Hybrid Tropical-Winter Storms, Blizzards, Nor'easters, Storm Complexes and a Drought	2012–13	North America ( (United States) , (Canada) )
1981 Gulf of Corinth earthquakes	$812	$2876	22	Earthquake	1981	Greece
2019 Sichuan earthquake	$812	$1023	13	Earthquake	2019	China
1978 Miyagi earthquake	$800	$3949	28	Earthquake	1978	Japan
Cyclone Nisha	$800	$1196	204	Tropical cyclone	2008	India, Sri Lanka
2009 southeastern Australia heat wave	$800 (estimated)	$1201	374	Heatwave	2009	Australia
Cyclone Helen	$796	$1100	10	Tropical cyclone	2013	India
Hurricane Nate	$787	$1034	48	Tropical cyclone	2017	North and Central America ( (Nicaragua) , (Costa Rica) , (Panama) , others)
Hurricane Flora	$773	$8129	7,193	Tropical cyclone	1963	North and Central America ( (Haiti) , (Cuba) , (Dominican Republic) , others)
2026 Kumamoto earthquake	$738.2	$738	38	Earthquake	2026	Japan
2021 South Moravia tornado	$716	$851	6	Tornado	2021	Czech Republic
1991 Mount Pinatubo eruption	$700	$1655	800	Volcano	1991	Philippines
2011 Slave Lake wildfire	$700	$1002	1	Wildfire	2011	Canada
1995 Aigio earthquake	$660	$1395	26	Earthquake	1995	Greece
2021 Maduo earthquake	$646	$768	20	Earthquake	2021	China
5 August 2018 Lombok earthquake	$607	$778	563	Earthquake	2018	Indonesia
1974 Super Outbreak + Xenia tornado	$600	$3917	335	Tornado outbreak	1974	, United States and Canada
1993 Okushiri earthquake	$600	$1337	230	Earthquake	1993	Japan
2015 Illapel earthquake	$600	$815	15	Earthquake	2015	Chile, Argentina
Cyclone Tracy	$500 – $600	$3264 – $3917	71	Tropical cyclone	1974	Australia
2018 Ponte Morandi collapse	$575	$737	43	Bridge collapse	2018	Italy
1960 Valdivia earthquake	$550	$5986	6,000	Earthquake	1960	Pacific Rim ( (Chile) , (United States) , (Japan) , others)
March 2021 Miyagi earthquake	$550	$653	0	Earthquake	2021	Japan
2011 Lorca earthquake	$534	$764	9	Earthquake	2011	Spain
1970 Ancash earthquake	$530	$4394	70,000	Earthquake	1970	Peru
2024 Uqturpan earthquake	$527	$541	3	Earthquake	2024	Central Asia ( (China) , (Kazakhstan) , (Kyrgyzstan) , others)
2000 Mozambique flood	$525	$982	800	Flood	2000	Mozambique
1906 San Francisco earthquake	$524	$18777	3,000	Earthquake	1906	United States
I-35W Mississippi River Bridge collapse	$483 – $543	$750 – 843	13	Structure failure	2007	United States
2017 Jiuzhaigou earthquake	$500	$657	25	Earthquake	2017	China
1971 San Fernando earthquake	$500	$3975	65	Earthquake	1971	United States
1984 Romeoville petroleum refinery disaster	$500	$1549	17	Explosion	1984	United States
1976 British Isles heatwave	$500	$2829	3,000 (estimated)	Heat wave	1976	United Kingdom, Ireland
October 1999 Mexico floods	$491.3	$950	636	Flood	1999	Central America ( (Mexico) , (Guatemala) , (Honduras) , others)
Typhoon Tip	$484	$2147	99	Tropical cyclone	1979	East Asia ( (Japan) , (Philippines) , (China) , others)
2011 Shan earthquake	$475	$680	151	Earthquake	2011	Indochina ( (Myanmar) , (Thailand) , (Laos) , others)
1995 Kozani–Grevena earthquake	$450	$951	0	Earthquake	1995	Greece
2007 Peru earthquake	$450	$699	595	Earthquake	2007	Peru
2014 Aegean Sea earthquake	$450	$612	3	Earthquake	2014	Southeastern Europe ( (Greece) , (Turkey) , (Bulgaria) )
1964 Alaska earthquake	$400	$4152	139	Earthquake	1964	United States, Canada
1990 Carlentini earthquake	$400	$986	19	Earthquake	1990	Italy
2020 Aegean Sea earthquake	$400	$498	119	Earthquake and tsunami	2020	Greece, Turkey
2005 Nias–Simeulue earthquake	$392	$646	1,738	Earthquake	2005	Indonesia
Ariane 5 Flight 501	$370	$760	0	Space flight accident	1996	(France) French Guiana
1990 Luzon earthquake	$369	$909	1,621	Earthquake	1990	Philippines
New York City blackout of 1977	$350	$1860	1	Infrastructure failure (electric)	1977	United States
1935 Yangtze flood	$333	$7820	145,000	Flood	1935	China
Mars Climate Orbiter & Mars Polar Lander	$328	$634	0	Space flight accident	1999	United States
Hurricane Keith	$319	$596	68	Tropical cyclone	2000	Central America ( (Mexico) , (Belize) , (Nicaragua) , others)
1995 Neftegorsk earthquake	$300	$634	1,989	Earthquake	1995	Russia
2009 Australian dust storm	$299–$425	$448.7–$637.8	0	Dust storm	2009	Australia, New Caledonia, New Zealand
Hitomi breakup	$273	$366	0	Space flight accident	2016	Japan
1988 Lancang–Gengma earthquakes	$270	$735	939	Earthquake	1988	Southern Asia ( (Myanmar) , (China) , (Thailand) )
Typhoon Vera	$261	$2883	5,098 (official confirmed)	Tropical cyclone	1959	Japan
2022 West Java earthquake	$256	$282	635	Earthquake	2022	Indonesia
1953 Worcester tornado	$250	$3008	90	Tornado	1953	United States
1971 Aconcagua earthquake	$250	$1987	83	Earthquake	1971	Chile
1980 Nepal earthquake	$245	$957	200	Earthquake	1980	Nepal, India
2024 Port Vila earthquake	$232	$238	14+	Earthquake	2024	Vanuatu
Great Chicago Fire	$222	$5966	300	Fire	1871	United States
2001 southern Peru earthquake	$215	$391	145	Earthquake	2001	Peru
1907 Qaratog earthquake	$200	$6911	15,000	Earthquake	1907	Tajikistan, Uzbekistan
1985 Kayrakkum earthquake	$200	$599	29	Earthquake	1985	Tajikistan
2009 Samoa earthquake and tsunami	$200	$300	189	Earthquake	2009	South Pacific Ocean ( (Samoa) , (American Samoa) , (Tonga) , others)
2006 Queens blackout	$188	$300	0	Power outage	2006	United States
2025 Kunar earthquake	$183	$183	2,217	Earthquake	2025	Afghanistan
2022 Hunga Tonga–Hunga Haʻapai eruption and tsunami	$182	$200	7	Volcanic eruption and tsunami	2022	Tonga
2009 Istanbul flood	$70–175	$105-263	31	Flood	2009	Turkey
2004 Baladeh earthquake	$165	$281	54	Earthquake	2004	Iran
2025 Tainan–Chiayi earthquake	$162	$162	0	Earthquake	2025	Taiwan
March 2007 Sumatra earthquakes	$160	$248	68	Earthquake	2007	Indonesia
2021 Russian wildfires	$144 (estimated)	$171	0	Heatwave	2021	Russia
1967 Caracas earthquake	$140	$1448	300	Earthquake	1967	Venezuela
2003 Colima earthquake	$119	$208	29	Earthquake	2003	Mexico
CryoSat-1	$118	$195	0	Space flight accident	2005	Russia
2018 Sweden wildfires	$115–290 (estimated)	$147.4–$371.8	0	Wildfire	2018	(Sweden)
1970 Bhola cyclone	$86.4	$716	300,000	Tropical cyclone	1970	Bangladesh, India
1908 Messina earthquake	$86.3	$3092	75,000–82,000	Earthquake	1908	Italy
1997 Cariaco earthquake	$81	$162	81	Earthquake	1997	Venezuela
2003 Zhaosu earthquake	$70	$123	11	Earthquake	2003	Kazakhstan, China
1979 Machchhu dam failure	$66.6	$295	1,800-25,000	Dam failure	1979	India
1915 Avezzano earthquake	$60	$1910	32,610	Earthquake	1915	Italy
1991 Uttarkashi earthquake	$60	$142	2,000	Earthquake	1991	India
2021 West Sulawesi earthquake	$58.1	$69	105	Earthquake	2021	Indonesia
2002 Denali earthquake	$56	$107	0	Earthquake	2002	United States
2006 Pangandaran earthquake and tsunami	$44.7	$71	668	Earthquake and tsunami	2006	Indonesia
1962 Vallés floods	$44.2 (official estimated)	$470	617 (official confirmed)	Flood	1962	Spain
2016 Imphal earthquake	$41.3	$55	11	Earthquake	2016	Southern Asia ( (India) , (Bangladesh) , (Myanmar) , others)
1936 North American heat wave	$40 (official estimated)	$928	5,000+ (estimated)	Heat wave	1936	United States
2018 United Kingdom wildfires	$40–50 (estimated)	$51–$64.1	0	Wildfire	2018	United Kingdom
2018 Attica wildfires	$39.1 (estimated)	$50	104	Wildfire	2018	Greece
2022 Luzon earthquake	$34	$37	11	Earthquake	2022	Philippines
1992 Nicaragua earthquake	$30	$69	116	Earthquake	1992	Nicaragua, Costa Rica
Sinking of the Titanic	$25	$834	1,490 – 1,635	Shipwreck	1912	United Kingdom
1922 Vallenar earthquake	$25	$481	1,000	Earthquake	1922	Chile, Argentina
Dust Bowl	$25	$580	7,000 (estimated)	Dust storm	1930–36	United States
2024 West Java earthquake	$25	$26	2	Earthquake	2024	Indonesia
December 2023 Mindanao earthquake	$22.8	$24	3	Earthquake	2023	Philippines
Mariner 1	$18.1	$193	0	Space flight accident	1962	United States
2025 Cebu earthquake	$14.89	$15	79	Earthquake	2025	Philippines
2019 Luzon earthquake	$10.5	$13	18	Earthquake	2019	Philippines
2025 Davao Oriental earthquakes	$7.1	$7	10	Earthquake	2025	Philippines
2024 Hajj extreme heat disaster	$5	$5	1,301	Heatwave	2024	Saudi Arabia
1957 Andreanof Islands earthquake	$5	$57	2	Earthquake	1957	United States
1953 Yenice–Gönen earthquake	$3.6	$43	1,070	Earthquake	1953	Turkey
