= 2006 heat wave =

2006 heat wave may refer to:

- 2006 European heat wave (July)
- 2006 North American heat wave (July and August)
