= 2006 North American heat wave =

Weather event in North America

Meteorological history
- Duration: July 15, 2006 - August 27, 2006
- Heat event
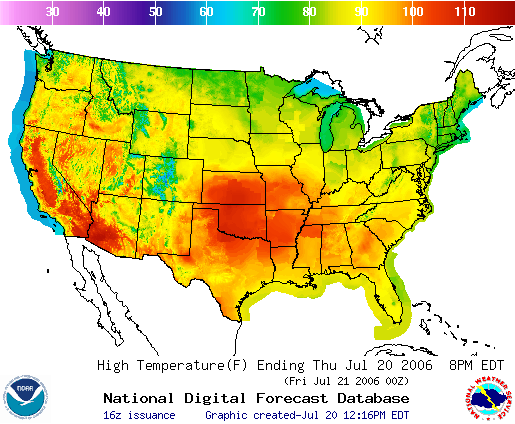
- Max temp: 119 °F (48 °C)

Overall effects
- Fatalities: At least 225
- Areas affected: Lower 48 U.S. states and lower parts of Canada

The Summer 2006 North American heat wave was a severe heat wave that affected most of the United States and Canada, killing at least 225 people and bringing extreme heat to many locations. At least three died in Philadelphia, Arkansas, and Indiana. In Maryland, the state health officials reported that three people died of heat-related causes. Another heat related death was suspected in Chicago.

Although many heat related deaths go unreported, by July 19, the Associated Press reported that the soaring heat was blamed for 12 deaths from Oklahoma City to the Philadelphia area. Reports by early morning July 20 raised the death toll to at least 16 in seven states.

This period of heat also saw a wind storm (derecho) in St. Louis that caused widespread power outages, including for cooling centers designed to provide relief for those suffering from the heat. In addition, places on the West Coast, like California's Central Valley and Southern California experienced humid heat, which is unusual for the area.

== Mortality ==
By July 21, when the first phase of this heat wave came to an end, 22 reported fatalities had occurred in ten states. Reports of deaths trailed off over the week-end of July 21–23, though high temperatures persisted and power outages remained in a number of areas including New York, Missouri, and Illinois. In St. Louis, half the city was without power due to severe thunderstorms, prompting requests for volunteer nurses to help cope with the situation. Though temperatures were somewhat cooler, there still was at least one further reported heat death in Missouri.

At least 31 deaths due to the heat were reported in New York City by August 16. At least 13 died in Queens, 9 in Brooklyn, 5 in Manhattan and 1 in The Bronx. By the end of August, authorities totaled 40 deaths in New York, however a later mortality review in November 2006 revealed that heat was a factor in 140 deaths.

In the early August heat, Chicago saw at least 23 deaths, but the City was widely praised for avoiding the disaster that occurred in the 1995 Chicago heat wave which saw over 700 deaths. The City took steps to ensure vulnerable residents were protected, and individuals took responsibility for their neighbors.

By August 13, 28 heat-related deaths were reported in Cook County, which includes Chicago.

=== Deaths in California ===
The most severe death toll was in California, principally in the interior region. By the end of July, the sweltering heat in California subsided, although the number of confirmed or suspected heat-related deaths climbed to 163 as county coroners worked through a backlog of cases. A report from California Climate Change Center published in 2009 determined that the heat caused two to three times the number of deaths estimated by coroners in seven California counties.

By July 25, California authorities documented at least 38 deaths related to the heat in 11 counties. Temperatures reached 110–115 °F (43–46 °C) in the central valley of California July 23–24. State officials said it was the worst heat wave to hit Northern and Southern California simultaneously in 57 years. Front-page newspaper coverage described some individual deaths. By July 29, the mounting death toll left the coroner's office in Fresno overwhelmed and double-stacking bodies.

There were also widespread animal deaths in California, with a veterinarian reporting 15 heat-related pet deaths as early as July 24. The impact on farm animals and agriculture was also becoming apparent, with the death of more than 25,000 cattle and 700,000 fowl, prompting emergency measures by the state.

== Meteorology ==
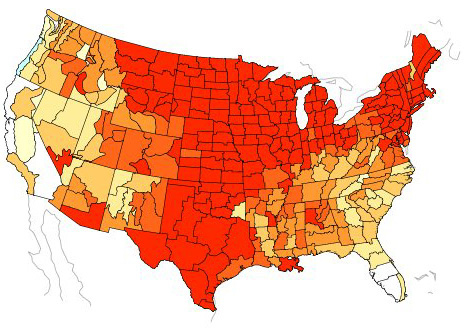
Annual temperature departures for the year 2006. 2006 was one of the warmer years on record since 1895.

Temperatures hit 118 °F (48 °C) on July 21 in Phoenix, making it the hottest day since 1995 and one of the 11 hottest since 1895, when temperature records were first kept in the city. California temperatures began reaching record levels by July 22. In one section of the City of Los Angeles, Woodland Hills, the temperature reached 119 °F (48 °C) making it the highest recorded temperature in the county and within the city border breaking the old record of 118 °F (48 °C) in Canoga Park. The unusual daytime heat resulted in extremely high overnight temperatures. Needles, California recorded a low temperature for Sunday, July 23 at 5 am., of 100 °F (38 °C) and in the LA basin the same night, Burbank recorded an overnight low of 77 °F (25 °C).

The California heat wave broke local records. According to some reports it was "hotter for longer than ever before, and the weather patterns that caused the scorching temperatures were positively freakish." Fresno, in the central California valley, had six consecutive days of 110 degree-plus Fahrenheit temperatures.

Beginning July 31 and into early August, the Midwest, Ontario, and Atlantic states also began experiencing the heat. Temperatures approached the 100 mark in Rochester, New York on August 1 and were coupled with the highest dew points the area has experienced in over 51 years. The heat index reached 110 °F (43 °C) that day. La Guardia Airport in New York City recorded three consecutive days above 100 °F (38 °C). The temperature peaked at 102 °F (39 °C) on August 2. Colonial Downs, a horse track in New Kent County, Virginia, canceled horse racing because of the 100 °F (38 °C) heat. The Saratoga Race Course, north of Albany, canceled racing at the horse track for the first time in its history on August 2. By August 8, the heat wave had passed for most areas, but persisted in the South and Southeast, with continued reports of mortality in Oklahoma.

=== Timeline ===
The heat wave went through several distinct periods:

- From July 15 to 22 very high temperatures spread across most all of the United States and Canada. On Monday, July 17, every state except Alaska, Minnesota, and North Dakota recorded temperatures of 90 °F (32 °C) or greater. North Dakota had recorded a temperature of 104 °F (40 °C) the previous day. On July 15, South Dakota has tied its record high temperature of 120 °F (49 °C) near Fort Pierre with the previous state record set on July 5, 1936.
- From July 23 to 29 the abnormal heat was concentrated in the West coast and South West deserts. 164 fatalities were reported in California during this period.
- From July 29 to August 4 the heat wave moved eastward, causing further fatalities as it progressed.
- From August 4 to 27, high temperatures persisted in the South and Southeast United States. The heat wave finally ended with the progression of a cold front through the Southern Plains.

== Effects on infrastructure ==
Dallas, Texas; Shreveport, Louisiana; the New England region; and other areas reported damage to physical infrastructure such as ruptured water lines and buckled roads. The heat wave has been blamed for the damage. Interstate 44 had two traffic lanes temporarily closed in Oklahoma City after they buckled under the heat. In addition, overworked power transformers have been damaged or rendered useless because of the heat, resulting in blackouts, notably in St. Louis, Missouri; Queens, New York; Los Angeles, California; and the Delaware Valley. Some wildfires, including forest fires, and greater thunderstorm intensity, have both been blamed on the heat wave.

Parts of California were without power from hours to days when infrastructure failed, such as when electrical transformers in northern California caught fire due to inadequate cooling. In Los Angeles, electrical transformers also failed, leaving thousands without power for as long as five days.

== Canadian heat ==
Parts of Canada, mostly areas of provinces located close to the U.S. border (Saskatchewan, Manitoba, Ontario and Quebec) had been affected in waves by the persistent heat over the continent building from west to east during the month of July, which progressed into August 2006. Persistent heat and drought had plagued some of the same regions of the country during the previous summers of 2002, 2003, and 2005, although large, frequent storms brought above normal rainfall to many areas in Ontario and Quebec during those years.

By mid-month, temperatures had soared to 42.1 °C (107.8 °F) at Lytton, British Columbia, with three straight days topping 41 °C (106 °F). Although various daily records were broken, the only overall monthly record in a major city was in Winnipeg, Manitoba where July was not only the driest on record but also had the highest average maximum temperature of any July. In Val Marie, Saskatchewan, the average daily maximum July temperature was 32.3 °C (90.1 °F), about 5 °C (41 °F) higher than average.

Just north of Toronto at Buttonville Airport, the temperature reached 37.8 °C (100.0 °F) on August 2, 2006. On the same day, the nighttime minimum temperature in Toronto was the highest ever recorded, only dropping to 27.2 °C (81.0 °F). In Ottawa, the temperature reached 36.3 °C (97.3 °F), but with close to 80% humidity factored in, it reached an all-time humidex record of 48 °C (118 °F).

Record power consumption was recorded in Ontario when close to 27,000 MW were used by consumers, beating out a record from the previous summer.

Powerful thunderstorms affected parts of Ontario and Quebec on July 17 and July 30 in Peterborough, in eastern Ontario (Ottawa area) in the early morning hours of August 1 and again in Quebec, centred around Montreal that same evening. More than 450,000 people lost power in Quebec in that storm. On August 2, more storms associated with a relieving cool front caused heavy damage over a wide swath of central and eastern Ontario, resulting in 175,000 residents losing power and thousands of felled trees blocking roads. Seventeen tornadoes were confirmed for August 2–3 ranging from F0-F2 in strength, the largest single day tornado outbreak in Ontario eclipsing the 14 recorded during a 1985 outbreak. The intensity of these storms was fueled by the heat bubble to the south. These series of storms killed at least four people and injured many others, in addition to extensive property damage and forest destruction.

After early August 2006, the heat only had a sporadic impact through the remainder of the month, mostly in the West. Temperatures returned to normal or even below average in other parts of the country for the remainder of the summer.

== Health effects of extreme heat ==
Although comparatively little reporting is made about the health effects of extraordinarily hot conditions, heat waves are responsible for more deaths annually than more energetic natural disasters such as lightning, rain, floods, hurricanes, and tornadoes. Supporting this conclusion, Karl Swanberg, a forecaster with the National Weather Service, reported that between 1936 and 1975, about 20,000 U.S. residents died of heat. "Heat and solar radiation on average kill more U.S. residents each year than lightning, tornadoes, hurricanes, floods or earthquakes," said Karl Swanberg. This finding is also referenced in a publication of the National Oceanic and Atmospheric Administration, giving guidance on how to avoid health problems due to heat.

== See also ==
- 1936 North American heat wave
- 1980 United States heat wave
- 1995 Chicago heat wave
- 2001 Eastern United States heat wave
- 2003 European heat wave
- 2006 Queens blackout
- 2006 European heat wave
- The Northern Hemisphere Summer heat wave of 2010
