= 2000 Southern United States heat wave =

Extreme weather event

Meteorological history
- Duration: August - September 2000
- Heat event
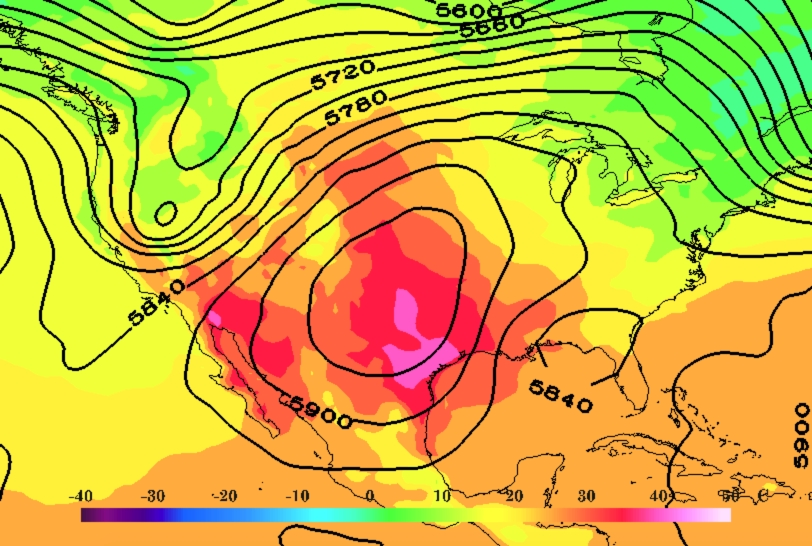
- MERRA2 data showing 2-meter temperature (in °C) and 500-millibar height fields at 7 p.m. CDT on September 5, 2000.
- Max temp: 112 °F (44 °C)

Overall effects

Aided by drought, a heat wave persisted in the late summer of 2000 along the southern tier of the United States from August to early September. Near the end of the period, daily, monthly, and even all-time record high temperatures were broken, with highs commonly peaking well over 100 °F (38 °C). On August 30, Memphis saw its second highest temperature of 107 degrees, just one degree short of its all time high of 108 degrees set in 1980. On September 4, Houston hit 109 °F (43 °C) and Dallas peaked at 111 °F (44 °C). On September 5, Corpus Christi peaked at 109 °F (43 °C) and San Antonio rose to an all-time high of 111 °F (44 °C), while College Station and Austin reached 112 °F (44 °C). Damage totaled $4 billion, mainly due to wildfires and crop losses, and there were 140 deaths.
