= May 2021 South Central United States flooding =

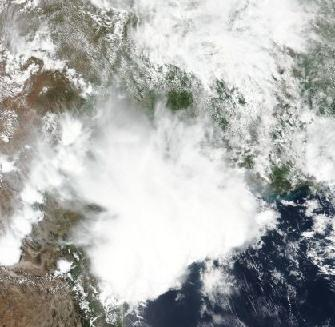
- The weather system partially responsible for the May 2021 South Central United States flooding, entering the Gulf of Mexico on May 19
- Date: May 16, 2021–late May 2021
- Location: Most of the South Central United States
- Deaths: 5
- Property damage: $1.1 billion

In May 2021, prolonged rainfall from a series of weather disturbances affected the South Central United States, namely Texas and Louisiana. As a result of rainfall totals, which peaked at 17.16 in (43.6 cm) in Fannett, Texas, widespread flash flooding occurred. Outside those states, Kansas saw up to 8.16 inches (20.7 cm) of rain, and 70 miles per hour (110 km/h) wind gusts, while New Mexico recorded a 69 miles per hour (111 km/h) wind gust.

== Meteorological history ==
At around 18:00 UTC on May 16, 2021, an outflow boundary developed over Northeastern Texas and moved generally southward. The outflow boundary then dissipated just 12 hours later and was quickly followed by an outbreak of severe thunderstorms over Texas while torrential rainfall began to affect portions Louisiana and Southeastern Texas. As a result of this rainfall, flash flooding began to occur over southeastern Texas and southwestern Louisiana. Throughout the day, several areas of low pressure and outflow boundaries developed over the Texas Hill Country. This caused severe thunderstorms to form over the region, which brought gusty winds, rainfall, and even some reports of hail. The next day, showers and thunderstorms began to develop over South Texas, which brought further rainfall to the area. On May 19, another round of severe thunderstorms moved through both Texas and Louisiana, worsening flooding across both states, and even causing impacts as far away as Oklahoma, Arkansas, and Mississippi.

These storms exited into the Gulf of Mexico, and began to be monitored by the National Hurricane Center (NHC) on May 21 for potential tropical cyclogenesis. Initially only given a low chance to develop, the NHC did note that conditions were slightly favorable for a short-lived tropical depression or storm to form in the western Gulf of Mexico, before the disturbance moved ashore back into Texas. By 12:00 UTC that day, a low-level circulation formed in association with the disturbance, however, the system lacked convection needed to designated as a tropical cyclone. Winds near the center reached up to 35 mph (56 km/h), with the NHC stating that any increase in thunderstorm activity would warrant the upgrade to a tropical depression, with the chance of doing so being raised to about 60%. Although at 0:00 UTC on May 22 while the disturbance was located roughly 150 miles (240 km) east-southeast of Corpus Christi, Texas, the probability of tropical cyclogenesis was lowered to around 50%. Had the system developed into a tropical storm, it would have either received the name Ana or Bill, if the former had not been taken by another more-organized disturbance near Bermuda.

== Effects ==
=== Texas ===
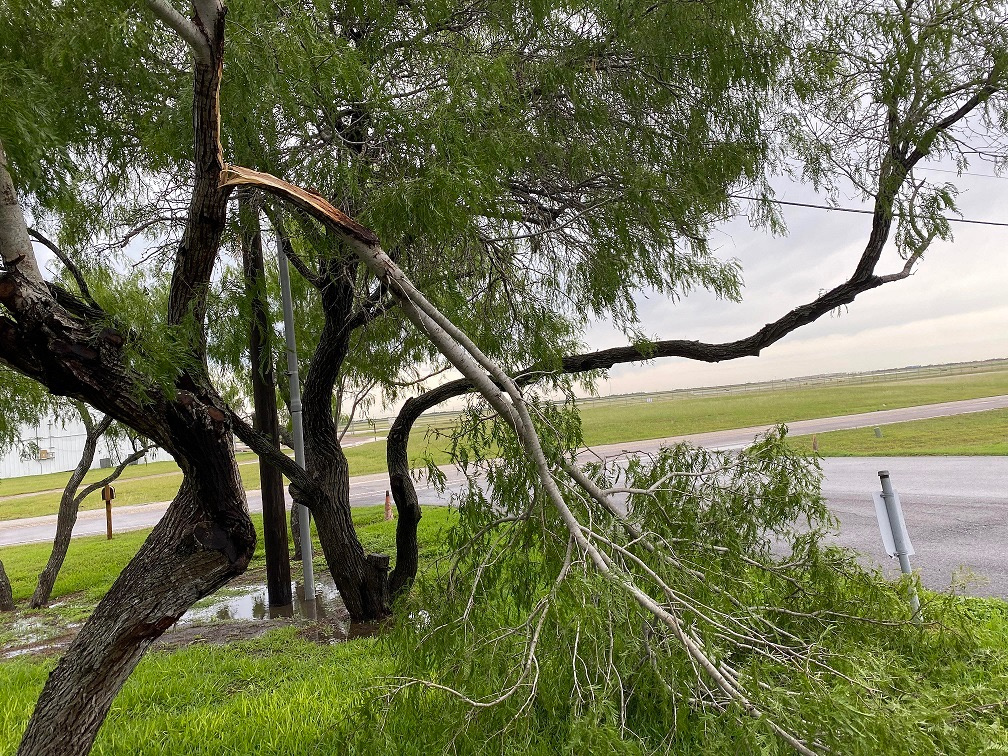
A snapped tree at the National Weather Service Office in Corpus Christi following a severe thunderstorm on May 19

Ahead of the severe weather outbreaks in Texas, flash flood alerts were put in place across Texas, which affected millions of residents.

In Portland, the Green Lake Dam collapsed following heavy rains at the Northshore Country Club. Oer 100,000 residents of Texas lost power. Wind gusts soared up to 71 miles per hour (114 km/h) in Dimmitt, Texas, while hail in Snyder, Texas reached 4.25 inches (10.8 cm) of rain. Several cities in Texas broke rainfall records May 19 with 2–3 inches (5.1–7.6 cm) of rain. Parts of Jefferson County, Texas were put under a flash flood emergency, which also extended into Louisiana.

=== Louisiana ===
All five deaths occurred in Louisiana, four due to driving in flooded waters, according to John Bel Edwards. In Lake Charles, Louisiana, a 24-hour period saw 11.8 inches (30 cm) of rain, a daily record.
