= Heat wave of 2006 derecho series =

Series of weather events in Southern Ontario and the United States

The heat wave of 2006 derecho series were a set of derechos — severe winds with powerful thunderstorms — that occurred on July 17–21, 2006. The first storms hit a wide swath of north-central and northeastern North America that stretched from the Upper Midwest through much of Ontario and into the northeastern United States. Another round struck the middle Mississippi River Valley, including two derechos that hit St. Louis, Missouri. The storms left more than three million people without power, some more than once and some for weeks.

== Northeastern Ontario derecho (July 17, 2006) ==
Northeastern Ontario derecho
- Date(s): July 17, 2006
- Peak wind gust (measured): 80 mph (129 km/h; 35.8 m/s)
- Fatalities: One

=== Northern Michigan and Northeastern Ontario ===
The derecho originated from a severe thunderstorm that was forming across portions of the Upper Peninsula and the northernmost parts of the lower Peninsula of Michigan in the early afternoon hours of July 17. It crossed the North Channel into Northeastern Ontario near Sault Ste. Marie, where it quickly developed into a derecho line. As it crossed Manitoulin Island just southeast of Sault Ste. Marie in Lake Huron, numerous trees were uprooted and some homes sustained heavy damage. An official wind gust of 128 km/h (80 mph) was recorded at the Killarney weather station on the north shore of Lake Huron. Tornado warnings were issued for the area, but damage was consistent with severe straight-line winds.

At about 15:30-16:00 EDT (19:30-20:00 UTC), the storm raced through Sudbury, toppling hydro poles and trees. Highway 69, the major highway linking Sudbury and Toronto, had to be shut down because electrical wires blocked the highway. At that point, the storm system started to take the form of a comma signature of a fast-moving progressive derecho.

At about 17:30 EDT (21:30 UTC), the storm gathered further intensity before striking North Bay, a city of over 50,000, and the surrounding Nipissing District. Numerous trees were uprooted or snapped off and many buildings sustained heavy surface and some structural damage. Just south of the city, radio towers and a lighthouse were demolished by the violent winds. At the nearby Jack Garland Airport, the wind measuring instrument snapped off before the peak gusts could be recorded; some estimates put them higher than 180 km/h (111 mph). Tornado warnings were in effect for the area and several funnels were reported but none has been confirmed. Within the district, the communities of West Nipissing, Callander, East Ferris and Mattawa, all about five hours north of Toronto, declared states of emergency in the wake of the storm as roadways in the area were blocked by felled trees and power was out throughout the region. The town of Mattawa and rural areas in West Nipissing were particularly hard hit as storage siloes were torn apart, roofs were torn from buildings, utility poles were snapped in two and roads were entirely impassable from the debris strewn across them, in some cases for weeks after the storm.

At the same time, the storm affected the Algonquin Park region (mostly the northern portion) and fallen trees killed at least one man from Michigan and injured another, also from Michigan, who were on a canoe trip near Kiosk, a small community located at the northern end of the park.

=== Ottawa Valley, Eastern Ontario and Southwestern Quebec ===
Through the next two hours the storm entered the Upper Ottawa Valley affecting places in Renfrew County such as Barry's Bay, Deep River, Cobden, Petawawa and Pembroke. There were numerous reports of damage, particularly blown-off or damaged roofs.

After crossing the Pembroke area, the derecho started to lose some steam. At times, the storm moved at a forward speed of 100–120 km/h (65-75 mph) but had slowed down somewhat when it entered the Pontiac region of western Quebec. Also, the north–south oriented line became more disorganized at its southern end. Still, the storm carried a lot of lightning and damaging wind as it crossed portions of the Outaouais region, the city of Gatineau and extreme northern portions of the city of Ottawa, primarily closer to the Ottawa River, at around 21:00 EDT. Areas such as Chelsea, Cantley, La Peche, Notre-Dame-du-Laus and Kazabazua were hit hard. Spectacular lightning was seen from downtown Ottawa and, when the storm was close enough, some pinkish colour was seen in the northern sky. In the Upper Gatineau north of the National Capital Region, several houses and cottages were damaged and scores of trees were snapped by winds in excess of 90 km/h (55 mph). Five campers were injured by fallen trees, caused by a microburst, while camping in Notre-Dame du Laus. Meanwhile, in the Maniwaki area, a local radio station antenna suffered extensive damage. Northwest of that town in Grand-Remous, several trailers in a park were heavily damaged or destroyed by the force of the winds but no injuries were reported there. Additional damage was reported in the Papineau region further east as well as in Mont-Laurier and the popular tourist village of Mont-Tremblant in the Upper Laurentians. The cities of Ottawa and Gatineau were brushed by the storm but escaped the worst of the effects.

=== Southern Quebec ===
During the rest of the late evening, the storm weakened as it travelled through southern Quebec and eastern Ontario, but still brought lightning to the Laurentians north of Montreal. The following day, the remnants of the derecho reformed over parts of New England, including Maine, with effects less severe than the original cluster.

== Aftermath ==
As a result of the storm at least one person died in the Algonquin Park region while another person was severely injured by a fallen tree. Other injuries occurred in many areas hit by the storms. Two people were briefly missing at the La Vérendrye Wildlife Reserve northwest of Maniwaki, Quebec during the height of the storm.

Hydro One in Ontario reported that over 170,000 customers were left without power in the northeast part of the province and that 90% of the city of North Bay lost power. All of Manitoulin Island was without power. Many others areas including the Sudbury area and the Upper Ottawa Valley towns of Pembroke, Mattawa and Petawawa also had major power outages. Major outages were reported in several areas in Quebec particularly in the Outaouais region. Hydro-Québec estimated that 145,000 of their customers lost power but separate storms in the areas around Rouyn-Noranda, Val-d'Or, Montreal, Trois-Rivières and Quebec City contributed to some of the outages.

Final damage assessments from this destructive storm are unlikely ever to be fully known, in part because of the remoteness of large portions of the affected area. The precise injury count and death toll are also uncertain, again due to inaccessibility to parts of the region, especially with trees blocking so many remote roads. Environment Canada investigated areas with heavy damage to ascertain whether tornadoes touched down, particularly on the Manitoulin Island and in Larder Lake, near Kirkland Lake but, at this stage, almost all damage reports are straight-line in nature and radar imagery favours a classic 'progressive derecho storm' with winds of up to and possibly exceeding 200 km/h (120 mph) at its peak, possibly with embedded tornadoes.

Later that evening a powerful cool front crossed southern Ontario causing further storm damage in Ontario (see below).

== Central Great Lakes-Upper Midwest derecho (July 17, 2006) ==
Central Great Lakes-Upper Midwest derecho
- Date(s): July 17, 2006
- Peak wind gust (measured): 70 mph (113 km/h; 31.3 m/s)
- Tornado count: 3 confirmed

While the northern part of the system was producing severe damage in Canada (northeastern Ontario and southern Quebec), an associated cold front led to significant damage in the US Midwest and Southern Ontario as it crossed the area later that same evening. There were dozens of reports of significant wind or tornado damage, especially in Michigan but also in southern Ontario, Wisconsin, Illinois, Iowa, and as far south as northern Missouri. The setup was similar along the long cold front, and the hot, humid air mass led to the damaging derecho, although the stronger derecho that affected areas well north of there formed much earlier that day in Upper Michigan just before noon local time. It had a clearly defined bow echo (squall line) formation, unlike these cells which were more fragmented.

=== Southern Ontario ===
Sweeping from west to east in the late-evening hours, the greatest concentration of damage was centred around Newmarket, Lake Scugog and the Kawartha Lakes region further to the east. Numerous trees and power lines were downed in those areas and one camper was killed (the second that day) when a tree crashed into a camping trailer at the Warsaw Caves Provincial Park, 30 km (19 mi) northeast of Peterborough. Official wind gusts reached 100 km/h (60 mph) at Pearson Airport near Toronto and 107 km/h (66 mph) at Peterborough Airport. Heavy storms also crossed Essex County in the southwest, associated with a southward moving line that hit much of lower Michigan. At least 70,000 people lost power in the south, bringing the total to at least 300,000 customers who lost power in Ontario that day. On July 19, 2006, Environment Canada confirmed two tornadoes hit a residential section of Newmarket. (See Tornadoes of 2006 article)

=== Michigan ===
The hardest-hit areas of Michigan appear to have been in the northern and central lower parts of the state, particularly in and around Oceana County. Several houses were severely damaged, and many others suffered various degrees of damage. In addition, the Oceana County Fairgrounds lost at least one of its buildings to the winds. At least one person was injured in the county. Extensive damage was reported in Benzie County. Wind speeds of 106 km/h (66 mph) were recorded in Saginaw.

Agricultural damage was severe; many grape and cherry crops were heavily damaged or destroyed, especially in Antrim, Grand Traverse and Leelanau counties. Since the storm took place just as the fruit crops were attaining maturity, the storm's effect on farmers was devastating.

One person was killed by a lightning strike in the Detroit area. In Michigan, over 270,000 people were without power at the storm's peak.

=== Wisconsin ===
Significant wind damage was reported in the afternoon of July 17 in parts of Wisconsin, especially the northeastern part around Sheboygan and Manitowoc. High winds knocked out power to at least 12,000 people and even knocked vehicles off Interstate 43. Winds were officially estimated to be at least 100 km/h (60 mph) but unofficial readings exceeded 120 km/h (75 mph) in Kohler. Some thought it was a tornado that hit but it was later confirmed to have been straight-line winds like most of the derecho.

Significant damage was reported in the city of Manitowoc, where hundreds of trees, power poles, and signs were blown down, knocking out power to hundreds of homes. Winds unofficially reached 120 to 130 km/h (60 to 65 mph) at the storm's peak. No injuries were reported in the state.

=== Illinois ===
Damage was reported in extreme northern Illinois along the same line. Trees and power lines were knocked over in much of the northernmost areas, some landing on power lines and buildings. Extreme heat compounded the problem, forcing emergencies to be declared in several communities.

More than 110,000 people were without power at the peak of the storm in Illinois, from Lake County to the Mississippi River. Peak wind gusts as high as 110 km/h (70 mph) were recorded in Stephenson. Some of the hardest hit areas were Crystal Lake, Mundelein, Rockford, Lake Zurich and Buffalo Grove. Damage was reported as far south as the city of Chicago, particularly on the Northwest Side. Numerous houses lost their roof as a result of the winds. Several people were injured, some due to lightning strikes.

=== Iowa ===
One tornado touched down at Tama, along with numerous hail and high wind reports in the eastern part of the state.

== Atlantic Coast derecho (July 18, 2006) ==
The same system refired on July 18 over the Northeastern United States. It produced similar damage over a large swath of New England and the Mid-Atlantic states.

=== Event ===
Like the system in Ontario but unlike the squall line of the upper Midwest, this was a continuous series of storms that produced widespread damage along its path.

The most significant line began in western Maryland, then tracked north-northeastward into southeastern Pennsylvania, northern New Jersey and the northern suburbs of New York City before tracking eastward into southern New England.

The system generally moved in an easterly direction, with new cells popping up further north as old cells dissipated. The first cells affected the southernmost part of Pennsylvania and western New Jersey. A new cell took over in northern New Jersey, crossing southern New York and southern New England.

Tree and power line damage were widespread throughout the affected area. A few people were injured, and several others barely escaped injury as a result of trees falling onto houses and cars. Some of the most spectacular footage came out of Providence harbor in Rhode Island, where a tanker caught in the winds exploded in the harbour while unloading gasoline. Fortunately, it moved away from the dock, preventing severe damage in the harbor.

Two people were killed by fallen trees in Chester County, Pennsylvania.

No tornadoes were reported in the region.

=== Aftermath ===
Hundreds of thousands of people were left without power across the region. In the Philadelphia area alone over 500,000 people were without power at the peak of the storm, according to PECO and PSE&G. Many customers remained without power until the weekend. The outage took place just after PECO had set record highs for electricity usage as a result of the extreme heat wave. Power crews from as far away as Chicago were called in to help restore power, after repairing the damage from the previous day's storms. A state of emergency was declared in Bucks County, Pennsylvania as a result of the storm.

In northern New Jersey, about 110,000 people were without power at the peak of the storm.

In New England, the damage was equally severe. More than 22,000 customers lost power in Connecticut at the storm's peak. In Rhode Island, that number was 30,000.

Railroad service was severely affected; several lines in northern New Jersey and southern New York were completely blocked by debris and the electric trains disrupted by power outages on several lines.

The wind graphic from the SPC shows an extensive trail of wind damage, with over 100 reports in the region.

== St. Louis area derecho event (July 19, 2006) ==
St. Louis area derecho
- Date(s): July 19, 2006
- Peak wind gust (measured): 100 mph (161 km/h; 44.7 m/s) (St. Louis, Missouri)

For the third consecutive day, a major derecho took place, albeit further southwest this time, making a direct hit on the St. Louis metropolitan area at about close to 7 p.m. on July 19. In all, 9 storm-related deaths were reported with 7 confirmed tornadoes.

=== St. Louis area ===
The derecho moved across the St. Louis area at about 18:45 CDT (00:45 UTC) that evening. The storms produced destructive straight-line winds across the metropolitan area, along with two isolated F0 tornadoes. These storms downed many trees atop active power lines, creating the largest electricity outage in the history of the City of St. Louis. More than 1,200,000 residents of the area were left without power amidst a heat wave during an already hot and humid midwestern United States summer. The outage was described by Ameren as the worst in the utility's history. The highest winds officially recorded were in Macoupin County, Illinois, in the northern part of the metropolitan area, where 160 km/h (100 mph) winds were recorded. Most of the region saw hurricane-force wind gusts near 130 km/h (80 mph).

At first, there was little warning that such a storm was going to hit. The moderate risk area was well to the north, and no severe weather was forecast in the area. The derecho surprised a sellout crowd of almost 44,000 St. Louis Cardinals fans, packed into the new Busch Stadium, to see the Cardinals versus the Atlanta Braves. Winds of about 130 km/h (80 mph) whirled around the St. Louis area, sending the fans running for shelter. The winds knocked out power and broke windows out of the press box. Nearly two minutes after the winds began at 100 mph, they stopped, and it began to rain. In all, about 30 people were injured at the stadium.

The storms went on to hit other cities in Illinois, including Alton, O'Fallon, Edwardsville, Bethalto, Glen Carbon and East St. Louis. The neighbouring towns of East Alton, Wood River, and Roxana house the third largest oil refinery in the United States. When the storms hit, they uprooted nearly 30% of all trees in the area, knocked out power for nearly a week, and left the refineries powerless.

==== Aftermath ====
The next day many St. Louisians dealt with a temperature of 97 degrees with a heat index of more than 100. Many people seeking generators or ice after the storms were faced with long queues at local grocery, hardware stores and gas stations. Many point-of-sale readers and automated banking machines were malfunctioning. Cash was the only usable tender at many locations. Gas shortages also became an issue as well as some food shortages.

After a few days, power began to come back on for most St. Louis citizens. Illinois was entirely up and running by July 27. The Florissant, Missouri area, which was hardest hit, was finally turned on by July 29, ten days after the storm.

The storms left a heightened awareness within local and state governments that this is one of the largest metropolitan areas in the country inside the outer belt of "Tornado Alley"; hence it is not completely safe. Ameren UE was criticized by some for not attending to their needs as quickly as others.

=== Origin and demise ===
The derecho had an unusual directional path. It originated in extreme Southeastern South Dakota. It pushed eastward through the Minneapolis area before starting its southeastern descent. The line rocked through the Quad Cities of Illinois and Iowa with 50-60 mph winds knocking out power to 127,000 before making another southerly turn. It hit Springfield, Illinois head-on with over 80 mph winds and it prompted a tornado warning although no touchdown was confirmed. The storm then made an odd southwesterly turn which put it on a collision course with St. Louis.

After hitting St. Louis, the storm stayed on a southwesterly track through the Ozarks of south-central Missouri. The derecho finally fizzled out in northern Arkansas.

== Mississippi-Ohio Valley derecho event (July 21, 2006) ==
Mississippi-Ohio Valley derecho
- Date(s): July 21, 2006
- Peak wind gust (measured): 80 mph (129 km/h; 35.8 m/s)

After a day of only scattered severe weather on July 20, another derecho took place on July 21. With 130 km/h (80 mph) winds, the storm battered the same areas that had been affected previously. Ameren estimated that the total number of power outages from both this storm and the July 19 storm exceeded 1 million.

=== St. Louis area ===
Barely 36 hours after being hit very hard by the July 19 storms, another derecho — albeit still developing at the time — slammed into the St. Louis area late that morning. The storm moved southeastward directly over St. Louis and caused more damage to an already damaged St. Louis. Many of the citizens whose power was restored was taken out again. Missouri Governor Matt Blunt declared St Louis a State of Emergency and sent the National Guard to assist the citizens with shelter, food, supplies, etc.

== Heatwave ==
The derecho that crossed into Ontario and Quebec was the result of a warm and very humid airmass that had plagued much of Central and Eastern Canada and the vast majority of the continental U.S. Temperatures in Toronto, Ottawa, Windsor and Montreal were approaching 35 °C (95 °F) for a few days including the day of the storms, while Heat Index values were exceeding well over 40 °C (104 °F) in some areas. Temperatures hit 100 °F (38 °C) at LaGuardia Airport in New York on July 18 and in St. Louis, Missouri on July 19, before storms pummeled those metropolitan areas. This heat wave was somewhat similar in structure but less deadly than the 1995 Heat Wave which had also spawned several destructive derechos across the Great Lakes.

== See also ==
- Derecho
- List of derecho events
- Tornadoes of 2006
- Heat Wave of 1995 Derecho Series - similar event that took place over a three-day period
