= 2006 Queens blackout =

Power outage in New York City

Coordinates: 40.7793°N 73.9039°W

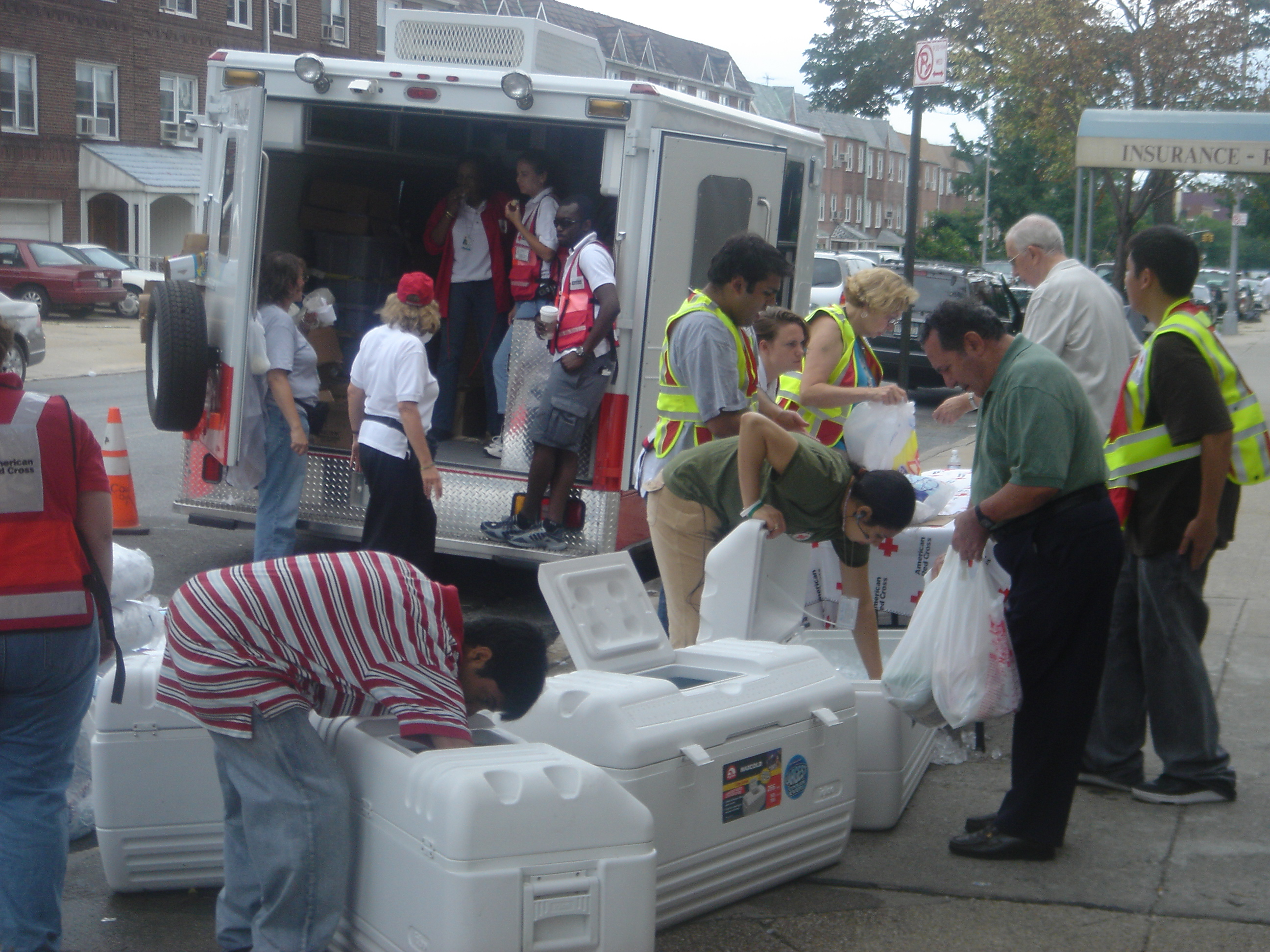
During the Queens blackout, Con Ed workers gave out bags of ice to people in Astoria.

The 2006 Queens blackout was a series of power outages that affected the northwest section of the New York City borough Queens in July 2006. The blackout primarily affected the neighborhoods of Astoria, Long Island City, Sunnyside, and Woodside. The outages affected 174,000 people, caused business losses of tens of millions of dollars, caused airport and transit delays and cancellations, and caused unsavory living conditions due to a concurrent heat wave.

== Cause ==
The cause of the outages—which was undetermined for five days—appeared to be the company's decision to continue supplying power to the 400,000 people serviced by twenty-two feeder cables after ten of them had failed, overloading the remaining twelve. After these were repaired, a manhole-to-manhole inspection and repair of smaller cables which had also burned took place. Consolidated Edison was due to make an initial status report, regarding the outage, on August 2, 2006. Data submitted by Con Edison in August 2006 indicated that the failed feeder cables had been in service an average of 16 years, with the oldest failed cable 59 years old.

== Effects ==
The northwest Queens power outages coincided with a heat wave in the New York City area the week of July 17. Their effects included knocking out power at LaGuardia Airport and parts of the subway. The outage also caused Rikers Island to switch to backup generators.

The worst result of the outages was a prolonged loss of power to 100,000 northwest Queens residents beginning on July 17. This outage was originally estimated by Con Edison to have affected only 1,600 customers. Con Edison defines a customer as a single edifice such that an entire residential building (which could conceivably be home to hundreds of individuals) is counted as one customer. Con Edison later revised its estimates tenfold.

== Restoration of power ==
Con Edison first believed it could restore power by the end of the day July 23, but their CEO Kevin Burke later stated he could not estimate how long it would take to restore full service. By July 24 (one week after the incident), about half of the customers affected had their service restored. The other half were still in the dark by July 21, 2006, and New York City government planned to provide food and shelter until they were all restored. There have been reports of offers of reimbursement for spoiled food of up to $300 per customer, however officials from Con Edison's claims department told residents they could submit a claim of up to $150 without receipts, or $350 with receipts, and merchants might file claims of up to $7,000. Also, in a separate press release, the power company stated that the requirement for grocery receipts would be waived.

== After the blackout ==
The extent of the outage and perceived poor response on their behalf prompted criticism to be levied on Con Edison and mayor Michael Bloomberg.

At a press conference on Wednesday, July 19, 2006, Mayor Bloomberg snapped at reporters for asking about the power outage in Astoria. The Queens power problem had been a constant item on NY1's 9 PM show The Call hosted by John Schiumo for the entire week of Monday, July 17, 2006, to Friday, July 21, 2006. He received calls from frustrated Astoria residents who managed to relocate with friends or relatives to be able to see the show and call in. In addition, there were calls from MTA officials explaining how the power problem affected the subways that week (July 17–21). By Friday, when the full extent of the problem was revealed, Bloomberg changed his stance.

In response to perceived inadequacies of Con Edison's response, on Monday, July 24, 2006, Councilmember Eric Gioia has called for the ousting of the CEO, Kevin Burke, on WNYC's radio show The Brian Lehrer Show.

Hearings were held in August 2006 by the New York Public Service Commission. James Gallagher, Director of the Office of Electricity and Environment of the New York Department of Public Service, testified that the blackout represented a "significant public health and safety risk" and a "significant economic loss."

== See also ==
- List of power outages
