= 2001 eastern North America heat wave =

Weather event in North America

A rather cool and uneventful summer along the East Coast of the United States (with a more average heat pattern occurring in the Midwest/Great Lakes regions) changed abruptly when a ridge of high pressure centered off the coast of South Carolina strengthened in late July.

It began in early August for areas of the Midwest and western Great Lakes before spreading eastward and intensifying. It waned in most areas by the middle of the month, and although fairly short in duration compared with some other continental heat waves, it was very intense at its peak.

The high humidity and high temperatures led to major heat wave that overtook the major Northeast Megalopolis. Temperatures in Central Park, New York City reached a peak of 103 °F (39 °C). The temperature reached 105 °F (41 °C) in Newark, New Jersey.

Meanwhile, in Ontario and Quebec, extreme temperatures were also reported daily during the first week of August. Ottawa recorded its second-hottest day ever when the mercury approached 37.3 °C (99.1 °F) on August 9 and at the Toronto Airport it hit 38 °C (100 °F) on the same day, the hottest day there since 1955 with four straight days topping 35 °C (95 °F). Numerous records were shattered during the heatwave. Even in Nova Scotia, surrounded by the relatively cool waters of the Atlantic Ocean, temperatures still broke 35 °C (95 °F) in some locations. Glace Bay, which has a sub-Arctic climate reached a record-breaking 35.5 °C (95.9 °F) on August 10.

National Football League offensive tackle Korey Stringer suffered a heat stroke during the second day of the Minnesota Vikings preseason training camp and died as a result of complications on August 1, 2001. At least four New Yorkers died of hyperthermia. Chicago had at least 21 deaths.

== The 2001 Heatwave in popular culture ==
The Tom Perrotta novel Little Children takes place in the middle of the heatwave.
