= 2006 European heatwave =

Heat wave in Europe

Meteorological history
- Duration: 26 June 2006 - 30 July 2006
- Heat wave
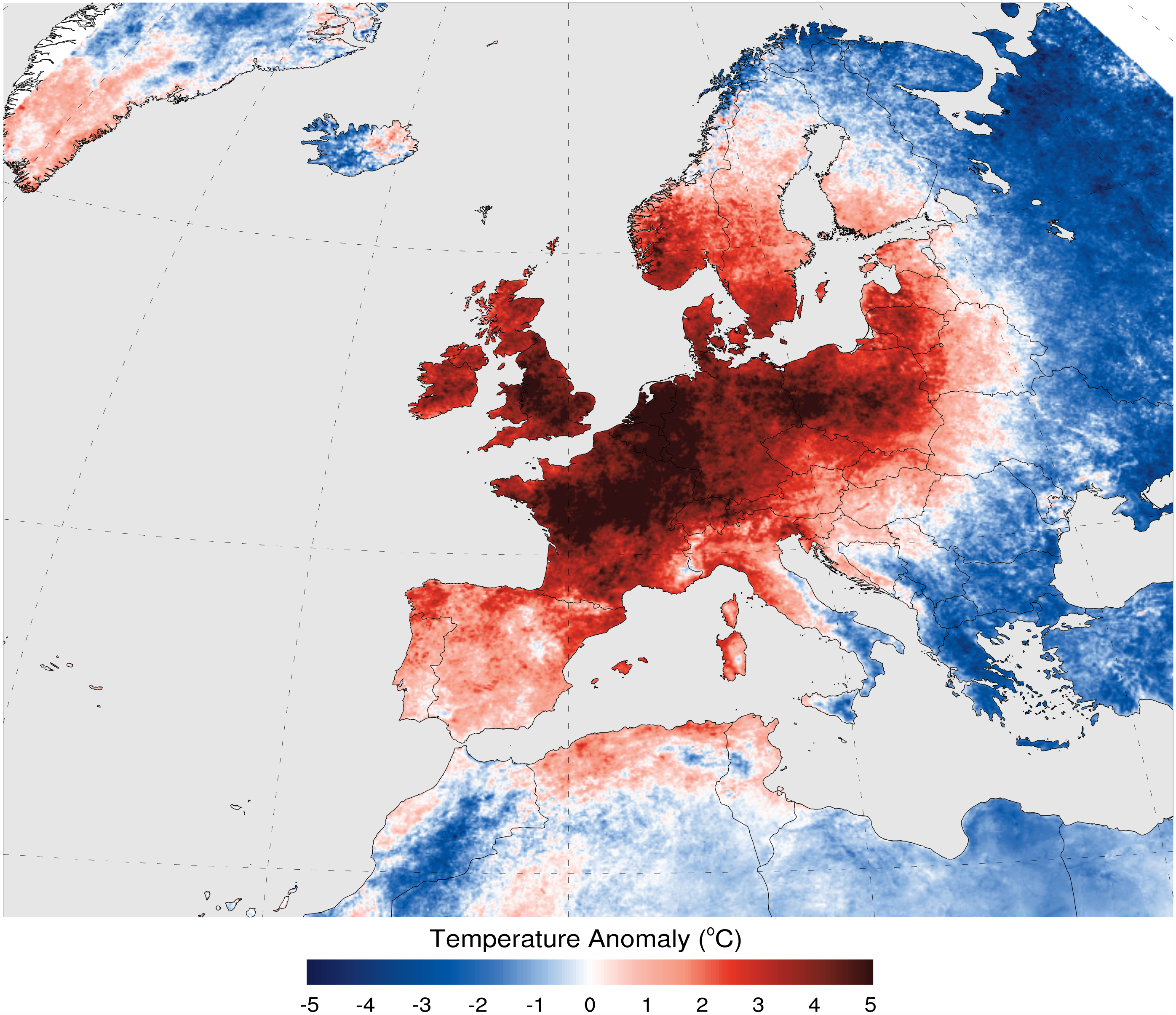

Overall effects
- Fatalities: 3,418
- Areas affected: Western Europe

The 2006 European heat wave was a period of exceptionally hot weather that arrived at the end of June 2006 in certain European countries. The United Kingdom, Ireland, France, Belgium, the Netherlands, Luxembourg, Italy, Poland, the Czech Republic, Hungary, Germany and western parts of Russia were most affected.

Several records were broken. In the Netherlands, Belgium, Germany, Ireland and the United Kingdom, July 2006 was the warmest month since official measurements began.

== Country-by-country ==
=== Belgium ===
Belgium experienced two heat waves in July 2006. Before 1990, a heat wave occurred about once every 8 years. Currently, the country averages one heat wave per year. On 19 July 2006, temperatures throughout the entire country rose to 36.2 °C (97.2 °F), causing it, at that moment, to be the hottest July day since 1947. The highest temperatures were recorded at the stations of Kleine Brogel and Genk, which measured 37.5 °C (99.5 °F) and 38.3 °C (100.9 °F), respectively.

In some regions, more particularly Limburg, 36 consecutive days of temperatures above 25 °C (77 °F) have been measured in one continuous local heat wave instead of two separate periods of hot weather (according to the official Belgian rules for registering a heat wave). In most other parts of the country, the second heat wave lasted for 17 days.

July 2006 became the warmest month in Belgian history, with an all-time high mean temperature of 23.0 °C (73.4 °F).

=== United Kingdom ===
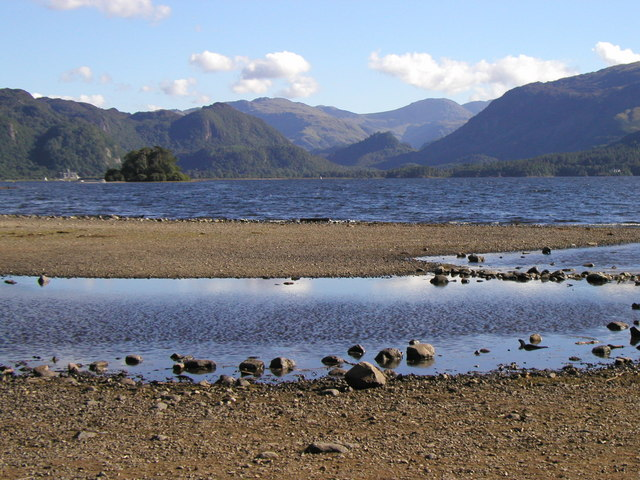
Low water levels at Derwent Water, Cumbria, July 2006

At 14:32 BST on Wednesday, 19 July 2006, 36.5 °C (97.7 °F) was recorded at Wisley, Surrey. This broke the UK's previous July record by 0.5 °C set in July 1911, although it fell 2.0 °C short of the 38.5 °C (101.3 °F) all-time record of the time set in August 2003.

Whilst a disputed 42.0 °C (107.6 °F) was recorded at Wisley Airfield on 18 July, this figure has never been accepted and the figure of 36.5 °C (97.7 °F) from 19 July is the highest acceptable value. This figure is generally deemed to be erroneous and it has been suggested that the recorded temperature was in fact 32.0 °C (89.6 °F). Another theory is that the 42.0 °C (107.6 °F) record on 18 July 2006 was recorded in the sunshine, not in standard 'shaded' areas. In July 2022, another heatwave brought extremely high temperatures to the UK, and on 19 July, the 16th anniversary of the 2006 36.5 °C (97.7 °F) July record, temperatures in excess of 40.0 °C (104.0 °F) were officially recorded for the first time in British history, and the highest recorded temperature of 40.3 °C (104.5 °F) in Coningsby, Lincolnshire is now accepted as the all-time record.

Similar temperatures were recorded in the sunshine during a brief heatwave at Wimbledon on 1 July 2015. The heatwave even warmed the normally cool and wet Scottish summer, with Glasgow having a July high of 22.7 °C (72.9 °F) and low of 13.7 °C (56.7 °F), which made it the warmest month on record. Because of the northerly location and marine nature, it was not a heat wave in a general sense, but rather unusually warm weather.

Drought was an issue in many parts of the United Kingdom after a very dry winter. There was warning of drought occurring from the early months of 2006. Following the dry winter, with extreme temperatures occurring in the country and little rain, increasing strain was put on water supplies, and hose-pipe bans were issued in many counties. The Environment Agency claimed that the UK may have had the most severe drought in 100 years.

Some power cuts occurred, after lightning strikes and some due to large amounts of electricity used by air conditioners. In Central London on 27 July 2006 a series of power cuts hit Piccadilly Circus, Regent Street, Turner Broadcasting UK and Oxford Circus causing the closure of shops and businesses, when pre-existing faults were worsened by heavy demand.

The Met Office confirmed that July 2006 was the warmest July, as well as the warmest single month, overall, across the UK, and a number of regional records were also broken.

The tarmac on some roads melted in England, requiring application of crushed rock dust.

=== Germany ===
In Germany most of the July temperature average records were broken. In Mannheim/Ludwigshafen a July average of 26 °C (79 °F) was recorded, which means a temperature anomaly of 6 °C (11 °F), which is a new record for a monthly average in Germany (in the same cities high temperatures reached over 40 °C (104 °F)). In Berlin an average temperature of 25 °C (77 °F) was recorded (7 °C (13 °F) above normal). Such numbers were recorded all over Germany. The biggest problem was the precipitation, which mostly fell in intense thunderstorms. At least 20 people died in this heatwave.

=== Denmark ===
Denmark experienced the warmest July ever with an average temperature (day and night) of 19.8 °C (67.6 °F), breaking a record of 19.5 °C (67.1 °F) set in 1994. It was the second-warmest month ever, behind August 1997 at 20.4 °C (68.7 °F). It was also the sunniest July ever, and the second-sunniest ever, at 321 hours. In fact, the previous July record was 290 hours. Since Denmark escaped the extremes seen further south, it is now known as one of the best summer months in history. On 25 June, the temperature reached 34.9 °C (94.8 °F) in Odense.

=== France ===
High temperatures in France destroyed many crops, just days before the harvest period, while French officials said at least 40 people were confirmed to have been killed by the heat wave directly. Temperatures as high as 37 °C (99 °F) were recorded in Paris during the heatwave. July 2006 was in many regions the warmest July ever recorded (and often the second warmest month after August 2003). In many regions weather was particularly stormy. In Nice, the all-time high temperature record was beaten with a 37.7 °C (99.9 °F) recorded on 1 August.

=== Ireland ===
Ireland was affected from the heat wave from the start of June, and the warm weather continued until the end of July.

Temperatures were well above average for both months. The highest recorded in June was 27.1 °C (80.8 °F) at Ardfert, County Kerry on 9 June. In Kilkenny, County Kilkenny, there were 29 consecutive days in July with temperatures over 20.0 °C (68.0 °F), and nine of these days had temperatures over 25.0 °C (77.0 °F). July 2006 was the warmest July in Ireland since records began. By the end of July, temperatures returned to average figures.

On 18 July, a temperature of 30.1 °C (86.2 °F) was recorded in Birr, County Offaly; the same day, 30.2 °C (86.4 °F) was recorded at Kilkenny Castle, County Kilkenny and Shannon Airport, County Clare. However, temperatures again rose to 31.0 °C (87.8 °F) at Casement Aerodrome, Dublin; and 32.3 °C (90.1 °F) at Elphin, County Roscommon on the 19 July – this is the warmest temperature recorded in Ireland since 1976. Temperatures over 30.0 °C (86.0 °F) are rare in Ireland, being recorded about once or twice every decade – 1976, 1983, 1989, 1995, 2003 and now 2006 are the most recent times of such high temperatures. The highest ever recorded in Ireland was 33.3 °C (91.9 °F) at Kilkenny Castle, County Kilkenny on 26 June 1887.

The highest mean temperatures during the heatwave were recorded at Merrion Square in Dublin city centre both months – 16.3 °C (61.3 °F) in June (average 14.6 °C (58.3 °F)) and 18.7 °C (65.7 °F) in July (average 16.3 °C (61.3 °F)).

To put this into context, average daily maxima in Ireland in only vary from 15 to 20 °C (59 to 68 °F) in June; and 16 to 23 °C (61 to 73 °F) in July.

Despite the high daytime temperatures, night time temperatures were sometimes below average (6 to 11 °C (43 to 52 °F) in June; 8 to 13 °C (46 to 55 °F) in July). Grass temperatures as low as −2.3 °C (27.9 °F) were recorded at Birr, County Offaly on 23 June; however, the lowest air temperature recorded was 2.0 °C (35.6 °F) at Straide, County Mayo on 14 June. The cool night time temperatures are thought to have made the heat wave more bearable there.

Sunshine levels were very high all over the country, with 257 hours (~8.6 hours a day) of sunshine recorded at Cork Airport, County Cork in June (making it the sunniest June since records began) and 283 hours (~9.1 hours a day) of sunshine at Rosslare, County Wexford in July (sunniest July since 1990). The sunniest day during the two months (and indeed, the year) was on 25 June, when Malin Head, County Donegal, recorded 15.8 hours of sunshine.

Rainfall levels were quite low, with only 13.2 millimetres (0.52 in) of rain at Derrygreenagh, County Offaly and Fermoy, County Cork in June and 13.0 millimetres (0.51 in) of rain recorded at Merrion Square, Dublin in July. Parts of Munster and Leinster also recorded 21 days between 28 May and 17 June where no rainfall was recorded. There was also a period between 9 July and 27 July when no rainfall was recorded in Greater Dublin. Despite the low rainfall, drought was not an issue in Ireland.

In Ireland, May 2006 was the warmest for 20 years and sunniest since 2000. June 2006 was the sunniest on record, driest since 1995 and also one of the warmest. July 2006 was the warmest on record, sunniest in 15 years and also driest since 1989. August 2006 was average.

September 2006 was the warmest on record. October 2006 was the warmest in many places since 2001 and sunniest since 2000. November 2006 was warmer and sunnier than usual. Overall, Summer 2006 (June, July and August) was the sunniest, driest and warmest summer since 1995 and one of the sunniest, driest and warmest on record. Autumn 2006 (September, October, November) was the warmest on record in many places, and sunshine levels were well above normal. Rainfall levels were also above average.

The months of June and July 2006 are regarded as one of the best summers ever due to the high levels of sunshine, warm temperatures and low rainfall. Drought and health problems were not an issue in Ireland, unlike many parts of Europe – mostly because the heat was not as severe there.

=== Netherlands ===
July 2006

With a monthly average of 22.3 °C (72.1 °F), KNMI statistics show July 2006 was the warmest-ever month on record for the Netherlands.KNMI Klimaatdata en Advies - Informatie over verleden weer Around 500 or 1,000 more people than usual died in July 2006.CBS - 500 extra doden in warme juliweken - Webmagazine

The Four Day Marches of Nijmegen were cancelled after only one day as hundreds of people collapsed the first day, two of them eventually dying due to fatal heat stroke. The walking people had to walk on open roads without any shade and there was not enough water for everyone. Paramedics had their hands full with hundreds of people who fainted due to the heat. The walking people had to deal with temperatures in the sun of 42 °C (108 °F). The air-temperatures on the first day of the four-day march was about 36 °C (97 °F). Forecasts showed even higher temperatures of 37 °C (99 °F) for the next day, causing the organisation to cancel the remainder of the event. Vierdaagse

The highest temperature was recorded on 19 July, when temperatures reached the mid- to upper 30s °C (mid- to upper 90s °F) for most of the country, especially in the south-east. The all-time record for the month of July was broken. Temperatures soared to 37.2 °C (99.0 °F). A few hundred meters across the border into Germany, at the weather station Kalkar, located at the airport in Weeze, near Nijmegen, a maximum of 38.6 °C (101.5 °F) was recorded on 19 July.

At some places especially in the south-east of the Netherlands temperatures passed 30 °C (86 °F) for 15 or 16 days. The average daytime temperature for the month was 30 °C (86 °F) again in the south-east of the Netherlands. The lowest daytime temperature was at some locations 34.1 °C (93.4 °F) for the whole month of July. For two days the daytime temperatures were below 25 °C (77 °F), making 29 days with temperatures of 25 °C (77 °F) and higher.

During days when temperatures reached 30 °C (86 °F) or higher, and on days without wind, the smog level was very high. Warnings were broadcast on television and radio, advising people to stay indoors as much as possible because the air pollution was very unhealthy, the smog was very strong and it was dangerously hot.

The Netherlands also had to deal with extreme drought in June and July. The rainfall in June was at some locations as low as 0.5 centimetres (0.20 in), July was also extremely dry. Because of the extreme heat and drought vegetation was very dry, and the humidity levels were very low, causing brushfires.

On 30 January 2007, the United Nations published a report of all countries in the world with the most deaths related to natural disasters for 2006. The Netherlands appeared fourth place, with 1,000 heat-related deaths. On 19 July, the temperature reached 37.1°C in Westdorpe.

=== Poland ===
July 2006 was the warmest in Poland since the beginning of the meteorological measurements (i.e. 1779). For most of the month, the maximum temperature exceeded 30 °C (86 °F) – even at night it rarely fell below 20 °C (68 °F). The average temperature was more than 5 °C (9.0 °F) higher than normal, for example in Warsaw the average temperature in July 2006 is usually 23.5 °C (74.3 °F), in Wrocław 23.8 °C (74.8 °F), and in Poznań 24.2 °C (75.6 °F). The highest temperature was recorded in Słubice, near the German border 36.5 °C (97.7 °F). After the hot days, the temperature at night dropped very slowly. On 16 July in Słubice the temperature at night was 27.4 °C (81.3 °F) and it was the warmest night in the entire history of meteorological measurements.

July 2006 was also extremely dry. In many regions it did not rain for 3–4 weeks. The river water levels were the lowest ever reported in Polish history and in the absence of rain, many crops dried up.

July 2006 in most Polish cities saw 300–350 sunshine hours (normally 220–240 sunshine hours): the highest number being in Poznań (373 sunshine hours) and in Warsaw (355 sunshine hours).

Post 2006:

July 2007 was AGAIN normal month in Poland. Temperature rarely exceed 30 °C (86 °F) and it was warm, wet and wild. In many regions, including Elbląg rained and it was stormy. Many crops returned to normal business, temperature rarely at night exceed 20 °C (68 °F) and it was Cloudy, and sunny.

=== Sweden ===
According to the Swedish Meteorological and Hydrological Institute (SMHI), the city of Lund in Skåne in southern Sweden had the highest average temperatures (day and night: 21.7 °C (71.1 °F)) for the month of July since records began in 1859. The rest of Sweden has however not broken the daily average temperatures from the record year 1994.

The highest temperature in Sweden in July 2006 was recorded in Målilla in Småland, where a temperature of 34.2 °C (93.6 °F) was recorded on 6 July. This is the highest temperature recorded in the country since July 1994 when Kalmar and Söderhamn had 35.1 °C (95.2 °F). Målilla and Ultuna are the places where the highest temperature ever in Sweden was recorded, 38 °C (100 °F), in 1947 and 1933 respectively.

Målilla was the warmest location during daytime, averaging 28.3 °C (82.9 °F), but with average lows being normal at 11.1 °C (52.0 °F) fell a whole degree short of Lund's aforementioned value, where the average high was 27.8 °C (82.0 °F) and low 15.6 °C (60.1 °F). The summer was warmer than usual in all of Sweden, but north of Stockholm and the Mälar valley the temperatures fell quickly, with the exception of the usual hotspot of Falun where the average high was 26.3 °C (79.3 °F) in spite of its location a bit north of 60 degrees latitude.

=== Russia ===
Absolute maxima of July 2006 have been broken in

- Pskov +35 °C (95 °F)
- Saint Petersburg +34.3 °C (93.7 °F)

The warmest July in

- Kaliningrad +21.2 °C (70.2 °F)

One day in August Stavropol reached +39.7 °C (103.5 °F).

== Period after the heat wave ==
Due to the extreme heat in July 2006, the ocean water reached a temperature normally reached in September. This increase in water temperature led to faster evaporation of ocean waters, making August one of the cloudiest and wettest months in recorded history in various western European countries. Many weather experts report this to be a direct consequence of the heat wave, as the high evaporation rate caused the atmosphere to generate many low pressure areas.

Despite this, September 2006 was again the warmest September on record, in the UK and elsewhere, due to high ocean temperatures, altered atmospheric pressure zones, and consequent different wind directions over Europe. The pressure zone changes were a consequence of the extra-tropical remnants of Atlantic hurricanes settling over the British Isles.

The Met Office announced on 16 October 2006 that the extended summer of May to September 2006 was the hottest summer ever recorded, the Central England temperature mean temperature of 16.2 °C (61.2 °F) for this summer was 2 °C (3.6 °F) warmer than the average temperatures of 1961–1990.

=== In the Netherlands ===
Just two months after July 2006, September 2006 became the warmest September since official measurements started. Additionally, October 2006 and November 2006 broke several temperature records. October was one of the warmest Octobers since measurements began, and November went into the record books as the second warmest November since official measurements started three hundred years prior. With temperatures from the north of the Netherlands to the south of Belgium ranging between 16 and 18 °C (61 and 64 °F) at the end of November, previous records were shattered. The autumn of 2006 was the warmest autumn in history, breaking the old record of just one year prior (2005) by 1.4 °C (34.5 °F). The winter of 2006/2007 was the warmest in three hundred years as well, and so was the following spring.

With the exception of August 2006, every month from April 2006 to June 2007 saw temperatures above average, the most bizarre months being January 2007, which noted an average temperature of 7.1 °C (44.8 °F) rather than 2.8 °C (37.0 °F), and April 2007, with 13.1 °C (55.6 °F) as opposed to 8.1 °C (46.6 °F). Temperatures reached a record-breaking 29.7 °C (85.5 °F) as early as 15 April. The average April daytime maximum in the Netherlands is around 12 °C (54 °F).

Such a sequence of events is unheard of in the Netherlands meteorological history, estimated to happen every 8,000 years when not taking global warming into account. It's been a result of a unique mixture of the hot summer increasing marine temperatures and Northern Atlantic hurricanes settling as depressions off the coast of Scotland, giving the European continent a constant stream of southern, fast winds rendering it unable to cool down from the Mediterranean through to northern Europe.

=== In Belgium ===
After the record-breaking month of July, August broke records on the opposite end. August 2006 was extremely rainy. Some places registered more than 200 millimetres (7.9 in) of rain and received a total sunshine amount of only 90 hours, which is less than half the expected sunshine for a typical August month and a record low for any summer month in Uccle. The average temperature was about 16.3 °C (61.3 °F).

September 2006 has been the warmest autumn month in Belgian history, with an average temperature of 18.4 °C (65.1 °F), while the normal temperature is 14.6 °C (58.3 °F) (1971-2000 normals), exceptionally preceding a much colder August month. October 2006 has been the second warmest in history with an average temperature of 14.2 °C (57.6 °F) (normal average for 1971-2000: 10.5 °C (50.9 °F)). November 2006 has been the 4th warmest month in history, with an average temperature of 9.1 °C (48.4 °F) (normal average for 1971-2000: 6.1 °C (43.0 °F)). December 2006 continued the warm trend.

The autumn of 2006, at that moment, had been the warmest autumn season in recorded history with an average temperature of 13.9 °C (57.0 °F), which was 3 °C above the normal average for the climatological period 1971-2000. As of 2021, this record still stands firmly.

2007 has broken many records as well. January 2007 broke every temperature record (minimum, maximum and average). The average temperature was 7.2 °C (45.0 °F), while the normal was just 2.6 °C (36.7 °F). February 2007 set some daily records and was 2 °C warmer than normal.

The winter of 2007, just like the previous autumn season, has also been the warmest in recorded history.

March 2007 was the 6th warmest month in history, just 0.8 °C less than the record at that time. April 2007 broke the all-time temperature records once again, as the average temperature had been 5 °C warmer than normal. Kleine Brogel had two tropical days on 15 and 16 April 2007 (30 °C (86 °F) and 30.7 °C (87.3 °F)), which have been the earliest dates any place in Belgium had ever seen temperatures at or over 30°C. May started warmer than normal, but a 9-month warmth streak eventually came to an end when June returned to average temperatures around normal.

=== In Finland ===
The summer of 2006 was around 2 °C warmer than the 1971–2000 average. While the heat was not record breaking, the drought was: less than half of the average summer rainfall was received in large areas, and almost all of the country received less than 75% of the usual rain. In many localities (such as Jokioinen, Kajaani and Rovaniemi, it was the driest summer on record. Autumn 2006 was also 1 to 2 °C (34 to 36 °F) warmer than the average. While this didn't break any records, an unprecedented period of mild weather began around the middle of November.

December 2006 was the warmest December ever recorded in Finland. In Helsinki, the December mean temperature was 4 °C (39 °F), beating the previous record of 2.9 °C (37.2 °F) set in 1929. Similar records were broken across the southern and central parts of the country, while in the north the old records narrowly remained in place. On 6 December, an all time December high of 10.8 °C (51.4 °F) was recorded at Salo.

The mild weather continued well into January 2007. On January 10, many places in southern Finland observed record highs for January. These included Helsinki-Vantaa at 8.2 °C (46.8 °F), Turku at 8.4 °C (47.1 °F), and Lappeenranta at 7 °C (45 °F). (The national record high for January, 10.9 °C (51.6 °F) set at Mariehamn in 1973, remained in place.) As a whole, the two months leading to 16 January were the mildest such period ever recorded in Finland. In Helsinki, the mean temperature for this period was 4.1 °C (39.4 °F), beating the previous record of 2.2 °C (36.0 °F) set in 1982–83. In Sodankylä, it was −4.7 °C (23.5 °F) (previous record −5.3 °C (22.5 °F) set in 1972/73). In the second half of January, temperatures plunged and February 2007 was well below the average over 1971 to 2000.

=== In France ===
After an unusually hot July, August was cooler, cloudier and wetter across the country, except on the Mediterranean coast.

September however turned to be very warm and sunny and in many parts of France it was the warmest in 50 years. October too was very warm and so was November, triggering in many regions the warmest autumn in recorded history. A very rare föhn-like warm spell affected northern and western France on 25 November and brought temperature as high as 18 °C (64 °F) at 7 in the morning in Paris.

December, January and February also brought extremely mild weather making the winter of 2006/2007 the warmest in recorded history.

March was relatively uneventful with average temperatures and precipitations. However April broke the record for the warmest April on record. In many regions it was also the sunniest (with almost uninterrupted sunshine for the whole 30 days) and the driest April on record. In northern and north-eastern France the departure from the normal of the average temperature was as high as 5 °C (9 °F). May was too very warm making the spring 2007 the warmest in recorded history for some regions.

=== In the United Kingdom ===
Like the rest of Western Europe, August 2006 saw a dramatic turnaround, being a cloudy and wet month in many parts with daytime maxima below average – although the Central England Temperature (CET) was close to the long-term average, due to the cloud keeping night minima higher than normal. The month was notable for its lack of heat waves, being the first August since 1993 when 30 °C (86 °F)) was not recorded anywhere in the country. Met Office: UK climate: August 2006 However, August 2008, which followed a much cooler July, was even duller and wetter. August 2010 again followed a similar pattern.

September 2006 was just as record-breaking as July, being the warmest on record and just as exceptionally, warmer than August had been. October and November, although not beating the records for the warmest set in 2001 and 1994 respectively, were also much warmer than average.

Winter 2006/07 was exceptionally mild, the warmest since 1868/69.

April 2007 was another record-breaker, with a CET of 11.2 °C (52.2 °F) the warmest in over 300 years of temperature records and by a large margin (10.6c being previous record). This record was broken 4 years later in 2011 with a CET of 11.8 °C (53.2 °F). Temperatures were widely above 20 °C (68 °F), with over 200 hours of sunshine for much of the country. Parts of south-eastern Britain had no rain all month.

=== In Poland ===
After a hot and dry July, August 2006 was cold and very rainy. The average temperature hovered slightly below the long-term standards. At the beginning of the month in the west of the country experienced torrential rains and violent storms. In Wrocław decreased 292 millimetres (11.5 in) of water; that is 4 times more than usual. As a result of heavy rains came the floods, which affected mainly Lower Silesia.

For a change September 2006 was warm and dry. In the west, that month was more than 4 °C (7.2 °F) warmer than the norm. In Słubice the average temperature was until 18.0 °C (64.4 °F). Early September brought gusty winds in Poland, near Bydgoszcz in Kuyavian-Pomeranian Voivodeship tornado passed, which escaped with the roots of several hundred trees.

October 2006 is also inscribed as one of the warmer in the history of meteorological measurements, as well as very dry. For many days the temperature exceeded 20 °C (68 °F) degrees, reaching up to 26 °C (79 °F) at the south of the country. It was also very sunny month, because reported about 150 sunshine hours.

November 2006 in Poland was the warmest from 10 years. The daily temperature reached up to 20 °C (68 °F) and at night rarely dropped below 0 °C (32 °F). November was very wet, usually dropped 100 millimetres (3.9 in) of water, and the standard is approximately 40 millimetres (1.6 in). Like in October the wind was blowing strongly, particularly on the coast of the Baltic Sea. At the end of the month, thick fog blocked airports in Warsaw, Kraków and Wrocław to 3 days.

Winter 2006/2007 was extremely warm and rainy, in many cities, the snow lay only a few days, and rain fell for MANY days. At night the temperature increased up to 14 °C (57 °F) degrees, which at this time of year, it was an unprecedented phenomenon. In January 2007, the maximum temperature increased to 20 °C (68 °F), especially in the south, where often blow halny – a foehn wind, and in Elbląg during the day 13 °C (55 °F), and at night 10 °C (50 °F). The average temperature in winter 2006/2007 in eastern Poland was about 2.5 °C (36.5 °F), normally −2.5 °C (27.5 °F) and in western Poland 4.5 °C (40.1 °F), normally 1 °C (34 °F).

This conclusion was the warmest winter since the measurements. In March 2007, in Elbląg this month was snow-less, but it rained and the temperature reached up to 17 °C (63 °F), and at night of 22nd of March 8 °C (46 °F). Summer 2007 was not that dry. It rained a lot, temperatures reached down to −1 °C (30 °F) in the Polish-Czech/Tatra hills, temps reached up to 35 °C (95 °F), but it lasted for only 2-3 days, and temperature fell down.

=== In Russia ===
December 2006 and January 2007 were the warmest months in Moscow, Saint Petersburg, Kazan and other cities of European Russia.

March 2007 was the warmest month in Moscow (+4.1 °C (39.4 °F)) with a record maximum +17.5 °C (63.5 °F)

In May 2007 the absolute maximum of month in many cities has been established:

- Tambov +36.1 °C (97.0 °F)
- Rostov-on-Don +35.6 °C (96.1 °F)
- Kazan +33.8 °C (92.8 °F)
- Moscow +33.2 °C (91.8 °F)

2007 and 2008 became the warmest years in Moscow history with average year temperatures +7.1 °C (44.8 °F) (2nd) and +7.3 °C (45.1 °F) (1st).

== Highest temperature per country ==
Country	Temperature	Date	Location
Austria	35.4 °C (95.7 °F)	20 July	Innsbruck
Belgium	38.3 °C (100.9 °F)	19 July	Genk
United Kingdom	36.5 °C (97.7 °F)	19 July	Wisley
Germany	38.9 °C (102.0 °F)	20 July	Bernburg
Denmark	34.9 °C (94.8 °F)	25 June	Odense
France	38.3 °C (100.9 °F)	21 July	Toulouse
Ireland	32.3 °C (90.1 °F)	19 July	Elphin
Netherlands	37.1 °C (98.8 °F)	19 July	Westdorpe
Luxembourg	38.4 °C (101.1 °F)	26 July	Echternach
Poland	36.5 °C (97.7 °F)	20 July	Słubice
Switzerland	35.3 °C (95.5 °F)	25 July	Geneva
Sweden	34.2 °C (93.6 °F)	6 July	Målilla
Russia	37.5 °C (99.5 °F)	17 June	Orenburg
Norway	30.5 °C (86.9 °F)	25 July	Oslo

== See also ==
- 1995 Chicago heat wave
- 2003 European heat wave
- 2006 North American heat wave
- The Northern Hemisphere Summer heat wave of 2010
- 2015 European heat waves
- 2018 European heat wave
