= 2009 European floods =

June 2009 natural disasters in Europe

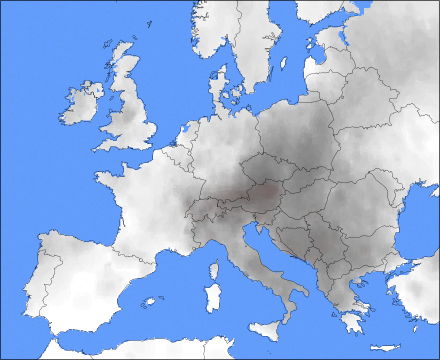
- Precipitation totals, 19–30 June 2009

Meteorological history
- Duration: June 2009

Overall effects
- Fatalities: 33
- Damage: Unknown
- Areas affected: Czech Republic, Poland, Slovakia, Austria, Hungary, Germany, Romania, Serbia, Turkey

The 2009 European floods were a series of natural disasters that took place in June 2009 in Central Europe. Austria, the Czech Republic, Germany, Hungary, Poland, Romania, Serbia, Slovakia and Turkey were all affected. The heavy rains caused overflowing of the rivers Oder, Vistula, Elbe and Danube. At least 12 people were killed in the Czech Republic and one in Poland.

The floods were the worst natural disaster in the Czech Republic since floods in 2002, which had killed 17 people and caused billions of dollars of damage in Prague. Those same floodwaters from the Czech Republic also affected Germany, with Dresden being hit by its worst flooding for over a century and three thousand people evacuated from areas where water was said to be waist-deep. Austria also experienced its heaviest rainfalls in half a century.

== Weather ==
June 2009 was one of the rainiest months of June for Austria since weather records have been kept. After a very dry April, May had already been wet, and in the middle of June, low pressure areas and thunderstorms followed. Quinton Low ensured strong rainfall in the Eastern Alps, the southern Carpathians, and from the middle of the Balkan Peninsula to the Crimea and Baltic Sea regions between 20 and 30 June. It moved slowly over the Adriatic Sea toward the Black Sea forming an upper low – despite the typical muggy movement from the southeast and build-up of precipitation from the east and northeast, a classic flood situation that was missing the Genoa low of a ground low core.

The Quinton Low formed from 20 to 22 June, through constriction of an upper low over the Alps towards the southeast. An Atlantic infusion of cold air had brought heavy precipitation with snowfall down to elevations of 1500m. The separated upper low shifted over the mid-Adriatic on 20 and 21 June and the central Balkans on 22 June. Its front system, which was occluded from the east and then was guided to the northeast towards Central Europe, drove from 22 to 24 June from the Lower Inn Valley to the Vienna Basin with heavy precipitation of over 100mm/48h, with 207mm/48h in Lunz am See. Locally, this phase was similar to the 2005 European floods, although in that year there was a faster rise.

Starting on 25 June, the low moved over the Black Sea. On 25 and 26 June, the precipitation was concentrated in the area around Belgrade and Southern Hungary. In Austria and the Czech Republic, the situation eased. On 27 and 28 June, a front moved towards Southern Poland and the Baltic states, and further precipitation-heavy air masses once again struck the Czech Republic, Austria, and Serbia, as well as Central Bulgaria and Moldova on 29 June.

The stable and stationary weather situation did not disintegrate until after 29 June. However, the air mass over Central and Eastern Europe remained extremely moist and unstable such that heavy thunderstorms repeatedly drove further local floods in the following days. Local areas of heavy rain of up to 50mm in a few hours were recorded across Central Europe until the first two weeks of July. The end of the weather phase did not occur until the passing of the low Rainer over England and the North Sea and low Steffen over Southern Scandinavia, which the slowly advancing weather system surrounded from 3 to 9 July.

Cumulative precipitation of the three weather event segments

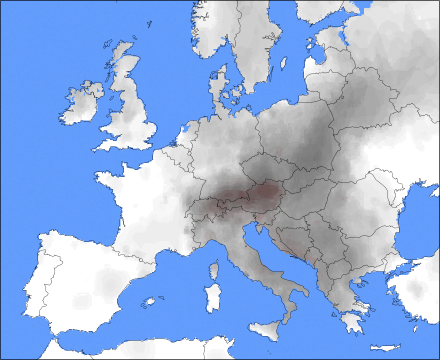
Low core Adriatic/Balkans 19–24 June 2009

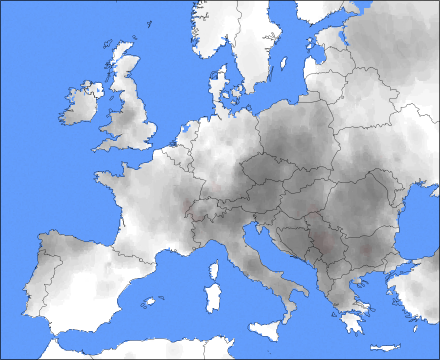
Upper low Black Sea 25–30 June 2009

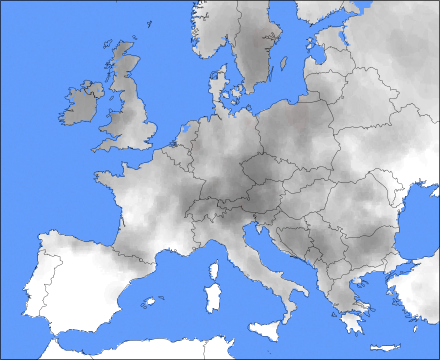
Unstable post-phase and advancing Atlantic low 1–9 July 2009

== By country ==
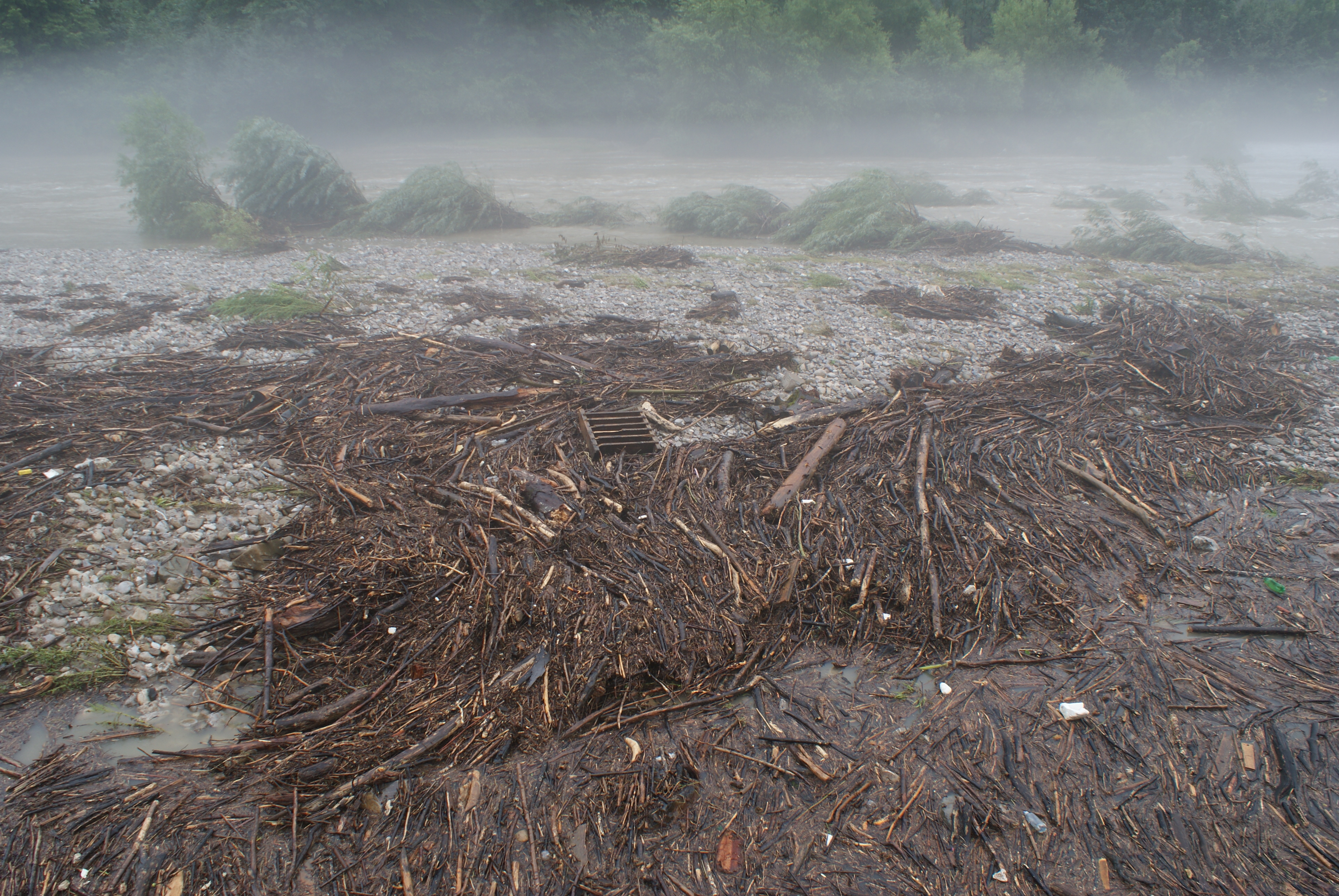
Driftwood in Wilhelmsburg, Lower Austria

=== Austria ===
On Tuesday 23 June, the strong rise began to impact the tributaries that lead from the south to the Danube, and flood warnings were triggered on the night of 24 June in many places in the Upper and Lower Austrian Prealps. The state warning centers were reinforced. By the morning of 24 June, about 4,000 firefighters were already operating in Upper Austria and Lower Austria. Armed Forces helicopters were also in use.

In Upper Austria, the Krems and Traun rivers partially came together at the banks. The level of the tributaries was rising while the Danube was steady. Seven districts in Lower Austria were already affected. The rivers Ybbs, Melk, Erlauf, Traisen, and Perschling were especially flooded. Ybbsitz had been closed off from the outside world since 3AM. At the Danube (Strudengau, Wachau), the available mobile flood prevention equipment was assembled as much as possible. In Styria, only individual actions were reported, mainly pumping operations but also elimination of mudslides.

By 25 June, the persistent rainfall was over. Instead, increasingly short heavy rains with large masses of water were recorded. Since the ground was no longer receptive to water, the aftereffects of these precipitations were similarly devastating. In Upper Austria, the situation calmed because the level of the tributaries was slowly falling towards normal levels. In Steyr, the level had sunk to the quay, 1.4m less than the previous day. The Danube had reached its highest level of 6.9m overnight in Mauthausen and also sank slowly. The center of the flood shifted towards Wachau as the precipitation itself moved towards the east. 253 of the 326 fire departments in Burgenland were called on for flood operations within 24 hours. The Albertina Museum in Vienna evacuated 950,000 artworks by artists such as Monet and Renoir.

On 26 June further floods affected areas stretching from Mostviertel to Burgenland, particularly in the Güssing District where whole tracts of land were under up to a meter of water, while Strem was surrounded by masses of water. The Armed Forces assisted the fire departments with 200 men. In the Lower Austrian Klingfurth near Wiener Neustadt, homes threatened by a landslide had to be evacuated. The Adria-Wien Pipeline, which lies in the affected hillside, had to be turned off for security reasons. In Styria, in which about 400 landslides were recorded since the beginning of the storm, the situation calmed a bit as the day turned to evening.

On Saturday 27 June, two dams of the Leitha river in Bruck an der Leitha District were broken open, allowing water to flow into an uninhabited area so as to relieve the river. On Sunday night, a fatality was reported.

Further installments of rain were encountered after the weekend. The assistance of the Armed Forces concentrated on the areas around Feldbach District and Fürstenfeld District. Upper Styria was also increasingly affected. The village of Radmer was without power and completely inaccessible after heavy mudslides. Floods and obstructions also surrounded Mariazell and Hieflau. The situation at the Enns intensified again. On the afternoon of Monday 29 June the level of the Steyr was again over 4m. Wachau also went into another flood warning. On the night of 30 June the Alpine railway station was flooded for the second time in the span of a few days after the strongest-ever measured rainfall in St. Pölten. The ÖBB again closed down the operation of the Mariazellerbahn.

On Tuesday, further landslides were able to be stopped with the help of Czech hedgehogs. Nevertheless, numerous buildings could still not be cleared as habitable. Due to scattered storms in Graz-Umgebung District, there were also frequent lightning strikes.

On Friday 3 July Wachau was affected by the storm for the second time within two weeks. Spitz, which had been previously flooded by the Danube, was flooded this time by the usually only 30 cm deep Spitzerbach, which swelled to 4m after thunderstorms. An 81-year-old man who was swept away was not found until 12 July in the Danube. Also, in Waldviertel and Steyr-Land District, severe thunderstorms occurred with heavy precipitation, which again required the use of over 2,000 firefighters.

On Monday 6 July the strongest rainfall in 200 years began in the afternoon hours. Parts of Lower Austria, Vienna, and Northern Burgenland were especially affected. St. Pölten was again declared a disaster area, as large parts of the metropolitan area were flooded. The Nadelbach flooded the cadastral communities Nadelbach and Hafing. The surroundings of the Alpine Railway Station were yet again under water. Areas that had never before had to suffer through flooding were also unexpectedly under water on 6 July. Europaplatz and Schießstadtring in St. Pölten had to be closed off; a 7m-wide stream had carved itself out leading from the Alpine Railway Station to the center of the city. The regional court and the prison were also threatened by high water. A further danger existed at the EVN Group substation as the water level had almost brought power production to a halt. The B1a tunnel under the government Landhaus district was blocked due to the flood. The Western Railway had to be closed down for two hours in the evening. Additional problems arose due to the rise of the groundwater level associated with the flooding, which also reached a historical peak.

Severe weather warnings were issued on Thursday 7 July that were similar in scope to the days before. This time however, the storm affected the Upper Austrian area more, where especially extensive damage had been done by hail in agricultural areas in Gmunden, Vöcklabruck, and Wels. In Dürnstein in Wachau, there were rockslides at Vogelbergsteig, which blocked both the Danube Highway and the Danube Railway. The B3 became once again freely passable on 10 July, after explosions that removed loose rock from the wall. However, the Danube Railway required longer repair work.

On 10 July the situation in Styria again took a turn for the worse. There was further rainfall, especially in Feldbach District. There were about 600 landslides in Styria around this timeframe.

==== Precipitation in Austria ====
From 7:00AM on 22 June to 7:00AM on 24 June, several places in Austria received over 150L/m^{2} of rainfall. Below is the total monthly precipitation for June 2009 – from Upper Austria to Northern Burgenland, 200-300% of the average monthly precipitation totals were recorded, with Spitzenwert in St. Pölten at 388%, almost four times the normal amount.

Location	L/m^{2} 48h	L/m^{2} June	Comments
Lunz am See	207	501	
Oberndorf an der Melk	179		
Waidhofen an der Ybbs	173		
Micheldorf in Oberösterreich	167		
St. Pölten / Landhausviertel	164	311	new ward record
Lilienfeld-Tarschberg	153		

The precipitation persisted even into the first half of July. Spitzenwerte was reached on 6 July. Places where the level reached over 50L/m^{2}:

Location	L/m^{2} on 6 July
Seibersdorf	101
St. Pölten / Landhausviertel	72
Berndorf	61
Mönichkirchen	54
Lilienfeld	51

==== Damage and relief efforts ====
Damage estimates were first released after two weeks. The damage in Burgenland amounted to over €2,500,000. In Lower Austria, about 3,000 claims were registered with a total claim amount of about €60,000,000. Because of this, the assistance for Lower Austria was increased from an estimated €2,500,000 to €10,000,000. In Upper Austria, damage claims were expected to be about €20,000,000. In Styria, the amount was about €10,000,000. The other federal states did not report damage totals.

Since disaster management in Austria takes place mainly at the federal state level, figures for all of Austria are not readily available. Countrywide figures were only released for the Armed Forces. 137,000 relief hours were worked in the assistance operation from 23 June to 9 July. On average, about 700 soldiers were deployed at any time countrywide. 311,000 relief hours were worked by firefighters and disaster assistance services in the largest federal state Lower Austria alone. The Austrian Red Cross also helped with many volunteers and crisis intervention teams. Likewise, Team Austria volunteers were put to work in the relief effort.

The fact that at the beginning of August in Lower Austria alone twelve streets and three railways were obstructed shows how extensive the infrastructure damage was. The repair work took weeks.

=== Czech Republic ===
In the Czech Republic, persistent heavy rainfall beginning on 22 June led to the rise of smaller Vltavan tributaries in the Bohemian Forest and the Nové Hrady Mountains. A flood warning was issued for the South Bohemian Region. The highest level was reached in the rivers Malše, Blatnice, and Černá. České Budějovice was also affected by the warning. In the evening, the Rožnovská Bečva rose about 1.2m in Valašské Meziříčí and its water level at the estuary in the Bečva rose to ten times normal. The Vsetínská Bečva also swelled and several streets were flooded in Vsetín, Valašské Meziříčí, and Rožnov pod Radhoštěm. In Zubří, numerous cars were overcome by the water. There were fatalities in Černotín and Valašské Meziříčí. In Český Krumlov, the Vltava reached six times the normal water amount, with 63 m^{3}/s. Near Větřní, a dinghy containing three occupants capsized, one of which drowned.

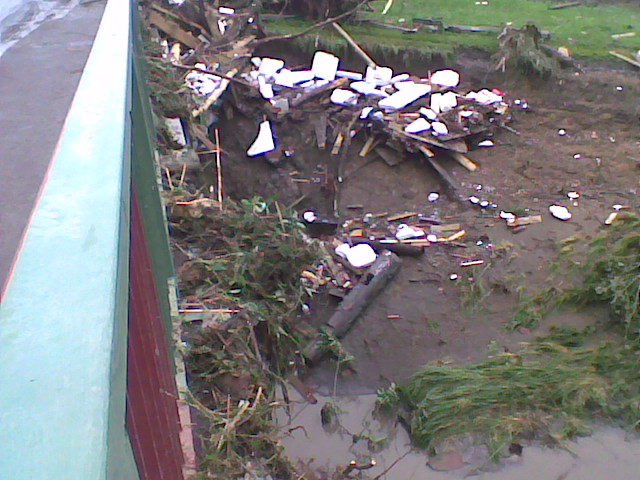
Flash flood in Nový Jičín on 25 June 2009, the morning after

The floods in North Moravia and Silesia took on a different character. In the span of two hours on 24 June, strong rainfall brought flash floods with up to 80L/m^{2} of rain at the streams Jičínka and Zrzávka. The level of the Jičínka swelled to 5.5m and thereby exceeded the 1997 Central European flood by 2m. In Jeseník nad Odrou, the brook Luha rose to 2m in the span of a half-hour; four people died in that community, three by drowning. People also died in Nový Jičín, Bernartice nad Odrou, Životice u Nového Jičína, and Kunín. The floods also created extensive damage in districts of Nový Jičín such as Bludovice, Žilina, Hodslavice, and Mořkov.

Other rivers temporarily rose over their banks after strong local rainfall. In Bohemian Switzerland, the Kamenice flooded parts of Janská on the evening of 1 July. On 6 July sudden thunderstorms hit Ústí nad Labem Region, where a state of emergency had to be called in some places. West and South Bohemia were also severely threatened in places like Tábor. The authorities feared a burst of dams of artificial lakes and considered evacuating the affected villages.

Parts of West and South Bohemia as well as Central Moravia were also greatly affected by the flood. In the region, dams of a series of artificially created lakes threatened to break. The authorities considered the evacuation of more villages on Tuesday night.

Overall, fourteen people died in the Czech Republic due to the impact of the flooding. The Olomouc Region and the Moravian-Silesian Region were particularly affected in the drainage basins of the Oder and the Morava where numerous streets and rail lines were disrupted.

In the first estimates, the total damage was estimated to be 5-6 billion Czech koruna (about €230,000,000).

Hepatitis vaccinations were commenced for children in severely affected areas in order to prevent an outbreak of the disease.

On 24 July the lowest flood warning level was lifted in Nový Jičín Region. Criticism of the speed of response by firefighters and municipalities was prevalent, as citizens were not informed about impending floods. The Environmental Minister Ladislav Miko confirmed that the meteorological internet server broke down at a critical time.

==== Precipitation in the Czech Republic ====
Precipitation in L/24 hrs (max L/hr)
Location	22 June	23 June	24 June	25 June	26 June	27 June	28 June	29 June	30 June
Valašské Meziříčí	7.1	23.8 (9)	30.9 (20)	0.6	8.1	0.4	7.1	0.4	6.3 (5)
Vsetín	1.6	7.4	12.8 (11)	1.5	0.9	0.1	9.7	7.0	19.1 (18)

Further Precipitation Peaks

Date	Amount (L/m^{2})	max. Amount/hr (l/m^{2})	Location
30 June	20.8	14	Vizovice
1 July	9.2	5	Vsetín
2 July	46.0	44	Staré Město
4 July	11.7	-	Kroměříž
5 July	14.7	-	Hejnice
6 July	35.9	24	Hamry

=== Germany ===
By 23 June the first warnings in Bavaria had already come, as precipitation amounted to 70L/m^{2} in 24 hours. In the mountains, snowfall was observed. On the Zugspitze, 60 cm of new snow fell. The first floods came at the Inn. Altötting, Berchtesgadener Land, Cham, and particularly Traunstein were affected by the flooding owing to rising tributaries.

On Thursday night, 25 June, the level of the Danube rose in Passau, such that the warning level reached 3 (definition: individual built-up properties or basements are flooded, blocking of local transport channels, or isolated use of water or dam defense is required). On Thursday, the flooding of the Danube and the Isar moved the warning level to 2 (definition: agriculture and forestry land is flooded or light traffic delays on main traffic roads and local roads). Throughout Thursday, the water level sank in Passau, however the recession was slow.

=== Hungary ===
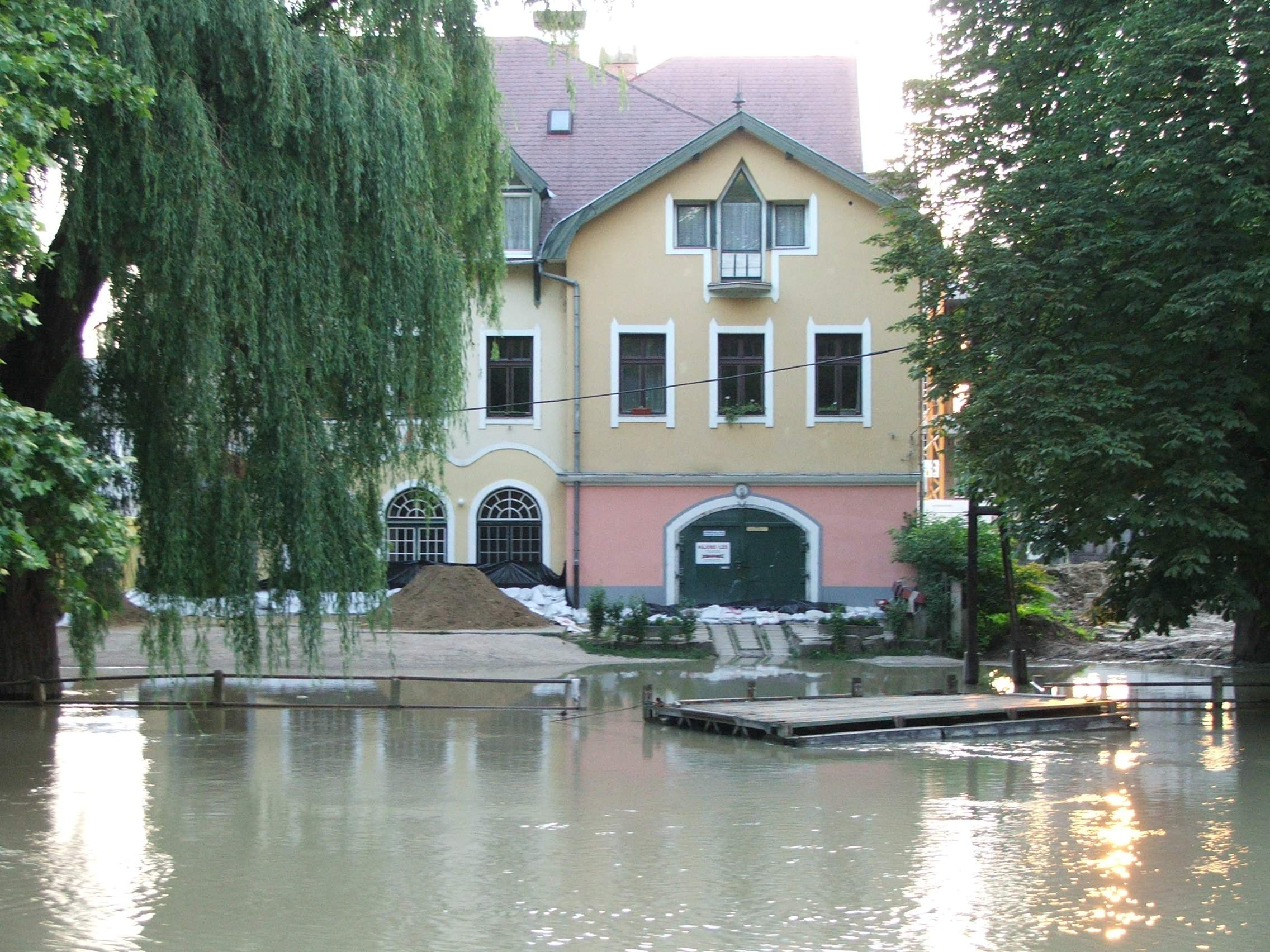
Nándor Zsolt Music School surrounded by water in Esztergom

The first flood notifications in Hungary came on 25 June. The Rába reached the highest ever measured level in Szentgotthárd on Thursday morning. This was about 30 cm higher than in a large flood in 1965. Due to the temporary expansion of flood protection and because the high water level did not persist, there was no expected risk. The Hungarian Western Railway still had to close down operation between Szentgotthárd and Jennersdorf because the rails were undermined in numerous places. In Komárom-Esztergom County, the first flood warning level was called. The Leitha in Hungarian territory was not affected.

On 26 June a cautious all-clear was announced for the Danube between Esztergom and Budapest because the water levels remained lower than had been feared. The peak was expected on the night of 27 June into the 28th and was estimated to be 40–50 cm deeper than in the devastating floods of 2006. Nevertheless, precautions were taken in numerous important locations, such as Szentendre Island.

On the morning of Sunday 28 June the Danube reached its high point, which was 25% less than the floods in 2006. Flood warnings were in effect for a stretch of 528 kilometers of the Danube in Hungary. In Nagymaros, the level rose 5.33m, while the level in Budapest rose 6.96m. The increase had been expected to be 7.04m for a short time. In the upper Danube areas, the level sank noticeably around this time. In Budapest alone, the floods led to the blockage of the two quays.

On 2 July there were alerts along 853 kilometers. 36 kilometers of third degree alerts near the river Lajta, second degree on the Danube at Dunakiliti, Győr, Komárom, Esztergom, Budapest and on the river Rába at Sárvár, first degree alerts from the Ipoly river mouth to the southern border of Hungary.

=== Poland ===
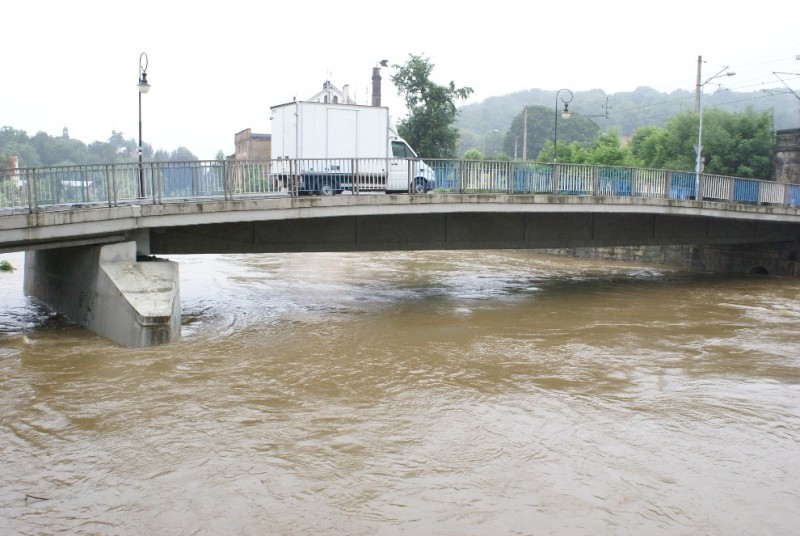
Flood in Kłodzko

On 23 June smaller rivers rose in the area of Rzeszów and in Lower Silesian Voivodeship. After strong rain fell in the Owl Mountains (at the rate of 60mm/h in Walim, for example), flood warnings were called for the Piława at Mościsko (Faulbrück) and the Bystrzyca Świdnicka at Lubachów (Breitenhain). In Świdnica, Bystrzyca Street flooded. Further damage was seen in Wałbrzych and Jelenia Góra.

The Polish National Security Center stated that rivers exceeded warning levels in forty-three areas, whilst alarm levels were exceeded in a further twenty places. A total of fifty families were evacuated in Kraków. Water submerged a railway station in Upper Silesia.

=== Romania ===
Flood warnings were issued for 22 and 23 June for 21 counties. Amidst rain and hail, warnings were also issued for the Buzău and Ialomiţa rivers for 29 and 30 June.

=== Serbia ===
Serbia was also hit with heavy rainfall by the storms. Places like Belgrade and Novi Sad in the north of the country were mainly affected, but Valjevo was also affected 90 km southeast.

=== Slovakia ===
Flood warnings were issued for parts of Northwest and far West Slovakia on 24 June and extended to the Danubian Lowland on the 25th. They became effective on 26 June for the entire length of the Danube and at the Morava. In Čirč in the Prešov Region near the Polish border, two people had already been killed on 23 June. A brother and sister drowned as the sister tried to rescue her brother.

In Devín, a suburb of Bratislava, the level of the Danube was 8.3m on 26 June. Alongside Devín, Petržalka, Šariš, and Dunajská Streda were affected by a storm.

On 27 and 28 June the flood shifted to Bardejov, Tvrdošín, and Námestovo. The communities of Rabča and Oravská Polhora were particularly at risk as two bridges had been destroyed. On the 29th, Kežmarok, Spišská Belá, Ľubica, Stará Bystrica, and Radôstka were affected by landslides and flooding and there were additional storms in Senica and Skalica.

A 20-year-old Slovak drowned in the Ružín reservoir. A Czech died as a tourist raft sank in the border river Dunajec. One person also died in Stará Ľubovňa near the Polish border.

=== Turkey ===
A flash flood in Istanbul started on 9 September. Heavy rains caused water to flood a major highway and commercial district in the city's Ikitelli district. Hundreds of people climbed onto rooftops, and many desperate motorists struggled to escape their vehicles and run to safety. Others drowned in their own vehicles. Many people taking refuge on rooftops were airlifted to safety by rescue helicopters. Rescue workers using inflatable boats also travelled through the flooded streets, picking up survivors. Some rescuers used ropes to drag people across the torrent to safety. Four helicopters and eight boats were used for rescue work. Istanbul firefighters recovered seven bodies at a truck parking lot littered with upended trucks. The bodies of seven women were found in a minibus outside a textile factory. The van had been taking them to their jobs, when the flood hit. Two other people died in Istanbul's Catalca suburb. 20 people died, others were listed as missing, and at least 20 were injured.

== Further storms ==
Storms followed this series of floods that had no connection with the weather referenced above but mostly affected the same areas.

On the night of 23 July a storm front moved from Germany into Austria, the Czech Republic, and Poland that arose due to previously prevalent unusually high temperatures. It impacted the area through hail and storms and partially also through heavy rainfall. In Lower Austria, where such fronts usually dissipate, the front strengthened and the storms hit the Vienna metropolitan area. The population was completely unprepared when the storm struck because it did not appear in any weather models. People were injured or even killed mainly by uprooted trees. Agriculture was also hit hard with damages. Widespread power outages were recorded. The Austrian insurance companies faced damages of around €20,000,000 in the agricultural industry alone. The Austrian hail insurance companies also faced the largest single event in the last 60 years from a cost of damages perspective. On 25 July the emergency personnel of firefighters and the Armed Forces was still engaged in partially repairing an estimated 500 destroyed houses in the Flachgau Region in order to achieve renewed rainfall resistance.

In Poland, eight people were killed and 34 people were injured by uprooted trees. Two people were also killed in the Czech Republic. Power was still not completely restored by 25 July in the surrounding areas of Liberec and Bohemia.
