= Zálezlice =

- Municipality
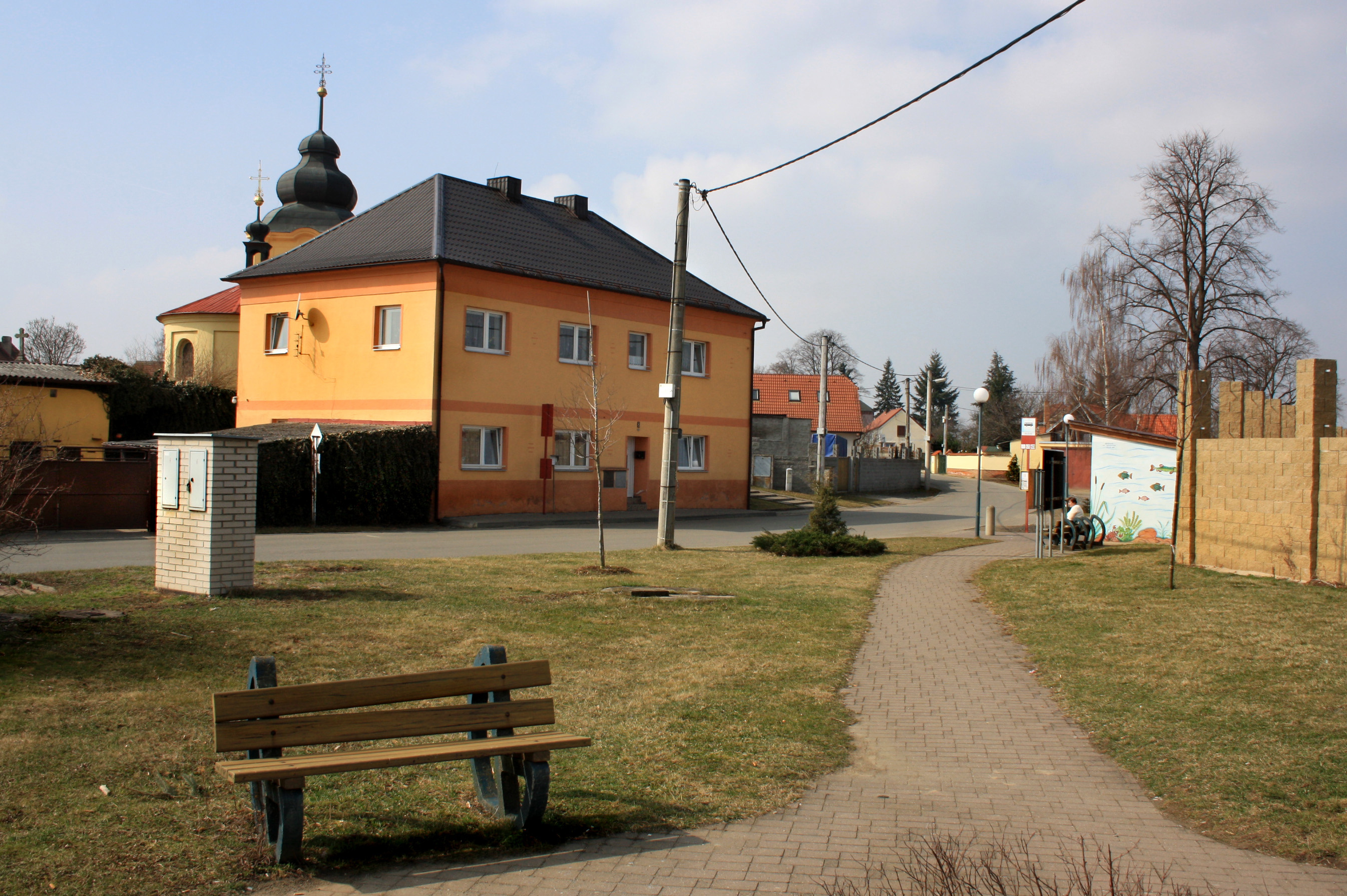
- Centre of Zálezlice

- Flag Coat of arms

- Location in the Czech Republic
- Coordinates: 50°18′28″N 14°26′15″E
- Country: Czech Republic
- Region: Central Bohemian
- District: Mělník
- First mentioned: 1300

Area
  - Total: 7.60 km^{2} (2.93 sq mi)
- Elevation: 163 m (535 ft)

Population (2026-01-01)
  - Total: 458
  - Density: 60.3/km^{2} (156/sq mi)
- Time zone: UTC+1 (CET)
  - Summer (DST): UTC+2 (CEST)
- Postal code: 277 45
- Website: www.zalezlice.cz

Zálezlice is a municipality and village in Mělník District in the Central Bohemian Region of the Czech Republic. It has about 500 inhabitants.

== Administrative division ==
Zálezlice consists of three municipal parts (in brackets population according to the 2021 census):

- Zálezlice (304)
- Kozárovice (89)
- Zátvor (42)

== Etymology ==
The name Zálezlice is derived either from the personal names Zalezl or Zalezlý, meaning "the village of Zalezl's/Zalezlý's people", or from the Czech adjective zalezlý ('holed up'), meaning "the village of holed up people".

== Geography ==
Zálezlice is located about 6 kilometres (4 mi) southwest of Mělník and 22 km (14 mi) north of Prague. It lies in a flat landscape in the Central Elbe Table. The municipality is situated on the right bank of the Vltava River.

== History ==
The first written mention of Zálezlice is from the beginning of the 13th century.

The municipality was badly damaged during the 2002 European floods and has been protected by a flood wall since then.

== Demographics ==
Historical population

| Year | Pop. | ±% |
|---|---|---|
| 1869 | 764 | — |
| 1880 | 746 | −2.4% |
| 1890 | 755 | +1.2% |
| 1900 | 752 | −0.4% |
| 1910 | 689 | −8.4% |

| Year | Pop. | ±% |
|---|---|---|
| 1921 | 667 | −3.2% |
| 1930 | 633 | −5.1% |
| 1950 | 431 | −31.9% |
| 1961 | 442 | +2.6% |
| 1970 | 468 | +5.9% |

| Year | Pop. | ±% |
|---|---|---|
| 1980 | 399 | −14.7% |
| 1991 | 346 | −13.3% |
| 2001 | 357 | +3.2% |
| 2011 | 375 | +5.0% |
| 2021 | 435 | +16.0% |

Source: Censuses

== Transport ==
There are no railways or major roads passing through the municipality.

== Sights ==
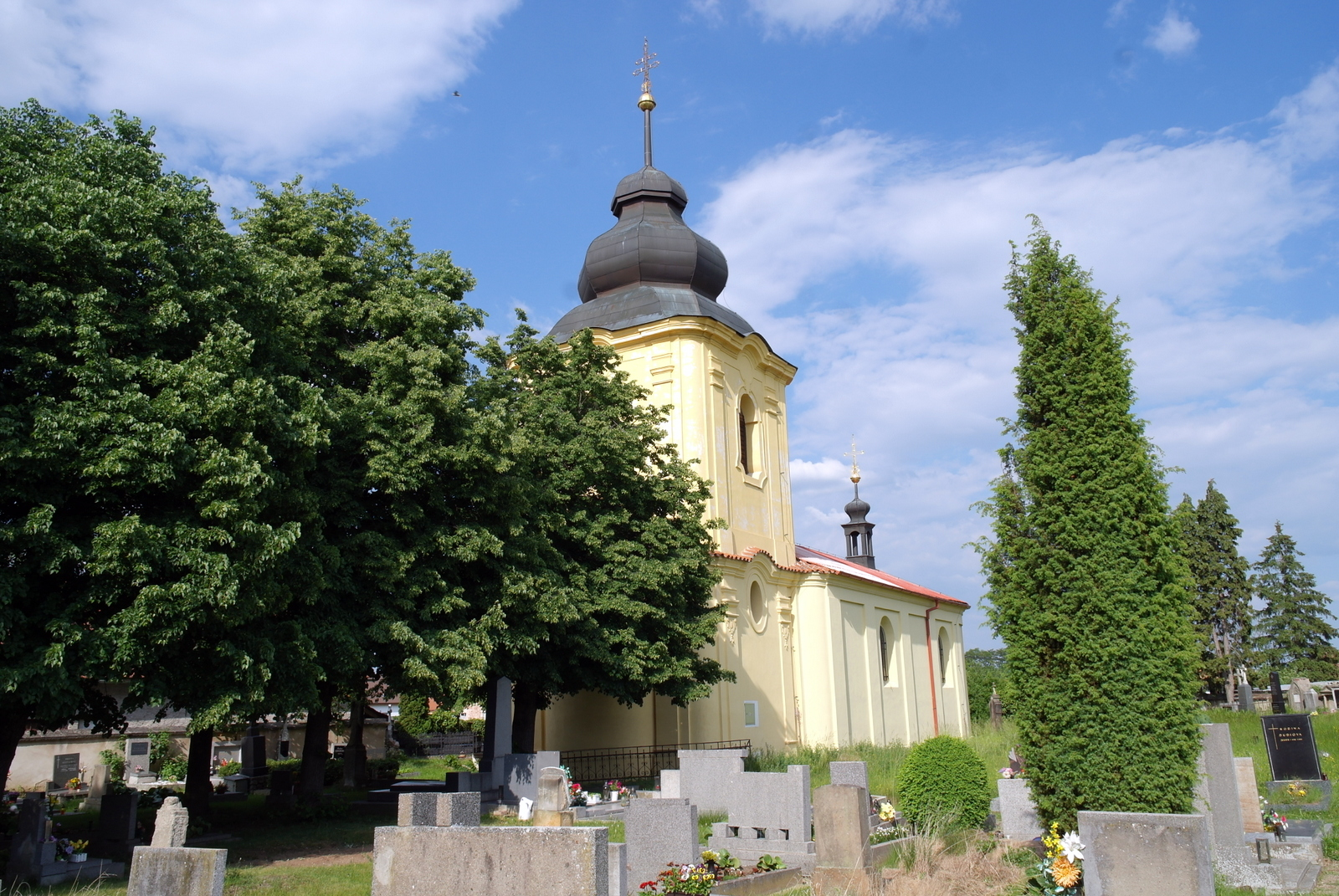
Church of Saint Nicholas

The main landmark of Zálezlice is the Church of Saint Nicholas. It is a late Baroque building from the second half of the 18th century. The church includes a Baroque mortuary.

== Notable people ==
- Vítězslav Hálek (1835–1874), poet, writer and journalist; lived here in 1841–1842
