= Apostles from the Agony in the Garden =

Fragments of a 16th-century Bohemian sculpture

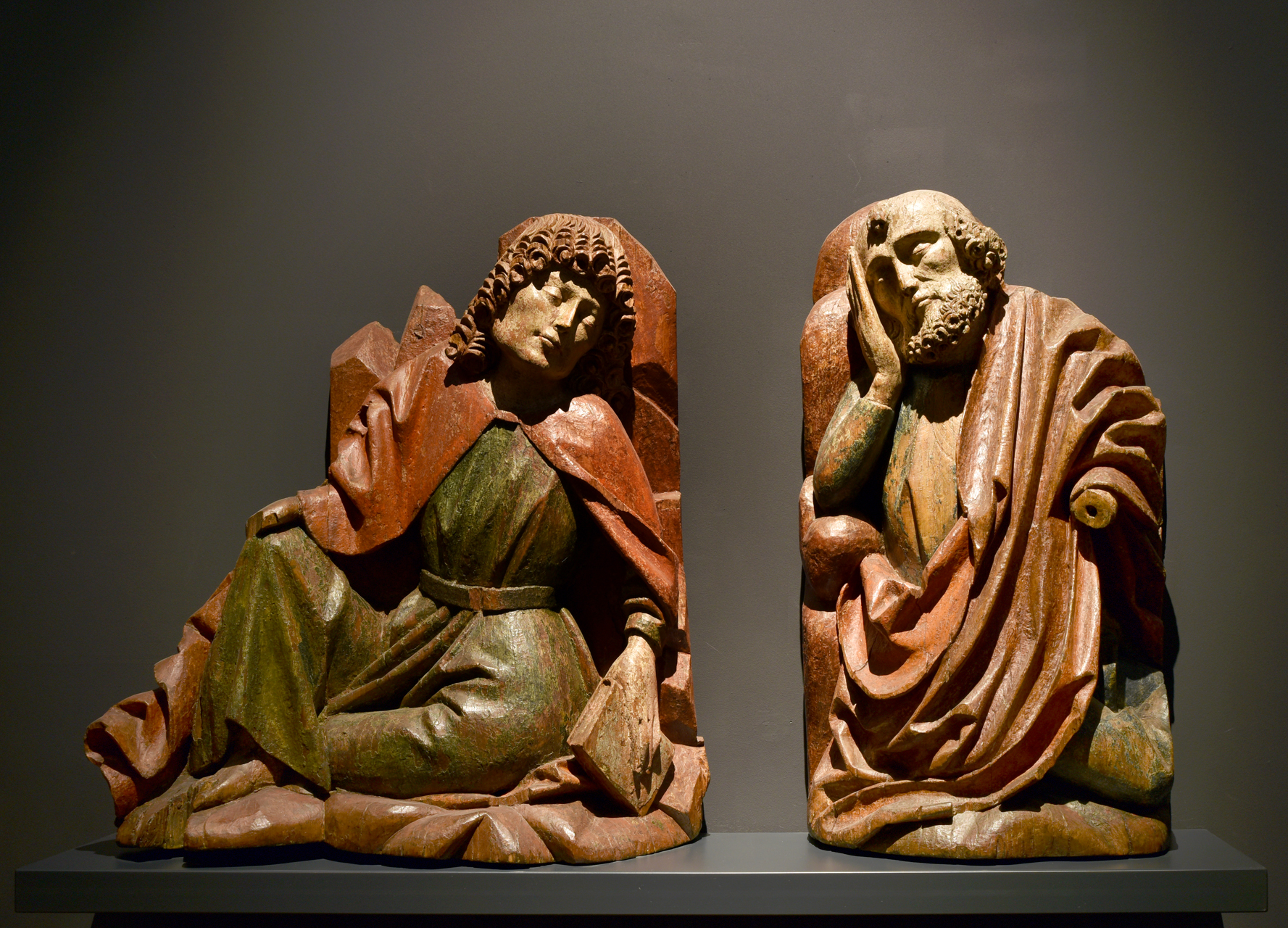
Fragments of the multi-figure sculpture, Gallery of Fine Arts in Cheb

The Apostles from the Agony in the Garden sculpture (1500–1510) are a fragment of a multi-figure sculpture of the Agony in the Garden of unknown origin. The statues were found at the town sawmill in Cheb, Czech Republic and transferred to the Municipal Museum. They are now on display in the permanent exhibition of Cheb sculpture at the Gallery of Fine Arts in Cheb.

== Sculptures ==
=== St. John the Evangelist ===
The statue is made of lime wood 73 × 66 × 24 cm in high relief, the fingers on the right hand and foot and part of the base are damaged.

St John the Evangelist is sitting cross-legged, leaning on a stylized rock in his sleep. The left hand is elbowed against the rock and holds a book, the right hand rests on the knee.

=== St. Peter ===
A lime wood statue 73 × 40 × 23.5 cm in high relief, the left hand (with sword?) and part of the legs are missing after the statue was cut behind the left shoulder.

Saint Peter is depicted half reclining on his side. His right hand, which supports his head, is resting with his elbow on a rock. In type, the statue corresponds to the West Bohemian carving tradition.

== Description and classification ==
Both statues have preserved the original polychromy on a fabric base. They were restored by K. Stádník (1972, 1986) and J. Živný (1994).

In the carving, the layout of the body volumes and the representation of the perspective abbreviation are mastered. The concept of drapery, which combines long lines of folds with deep depressions, places the creation of the sculptures in the first decade of the 16th century. According to Ševčíková, who places the creation of the sculptures in the late 1590s, this is the oldest and most valuable work of the local Cheb carving workshop. The effort to separate the upper mantle from the body core and the contrast of the rounded shape with the drapery has its clear logic. The drapery ceases to be a dominant element, is in balance with the figure and has a simple, smoothly soft and clear form. This simplicity also emanates from the heads of the apostles. It is an expression of deep understanding and retains the immediacy of emotional experience. The high quality of the work is due to the concentration on the human essence of the subject, for which she has found an appropriate mode of rendering.

The Cheb statue of St. John the Evangelist with crossed legs is close in its composition to the depiction of this subject from the Church of St. Michael in Vienna or the monastery church in Reichenau. The type of face with sharply cut features or wig-like curled hair is also different from other works preserved in the Cheb region, and parallels should be sought in Saxony, which also maintained contacts with the artistic centres in Franconia. The Franconian carving tradition combined with advanced features of Saxon sculpture is represented, for example, by St. John the Evangelist from Černotín.

In the late Middle Ages, the sculptural treatment of the Agony in the Garden ("Mount of Olives group") was very popular. The surviving complete sculptures of the Agony in the Garden include figures of the kneeling Christ and the Apostle St. James, or an angel with a cup of bitterness. Late Gothic stone sculptures of the Agony in the Garden are in the Church of St. Moritz in Olomouc, the Church of St. James in Jihlava and Modřice. The existence of sculptures in Bohemia is documented from the Church of St. Bartholomew in Plzeň (1468), in Bezdružice and in the Church of St. George in Horní Slavkov (destroyed after 1977).

=== Other works ===
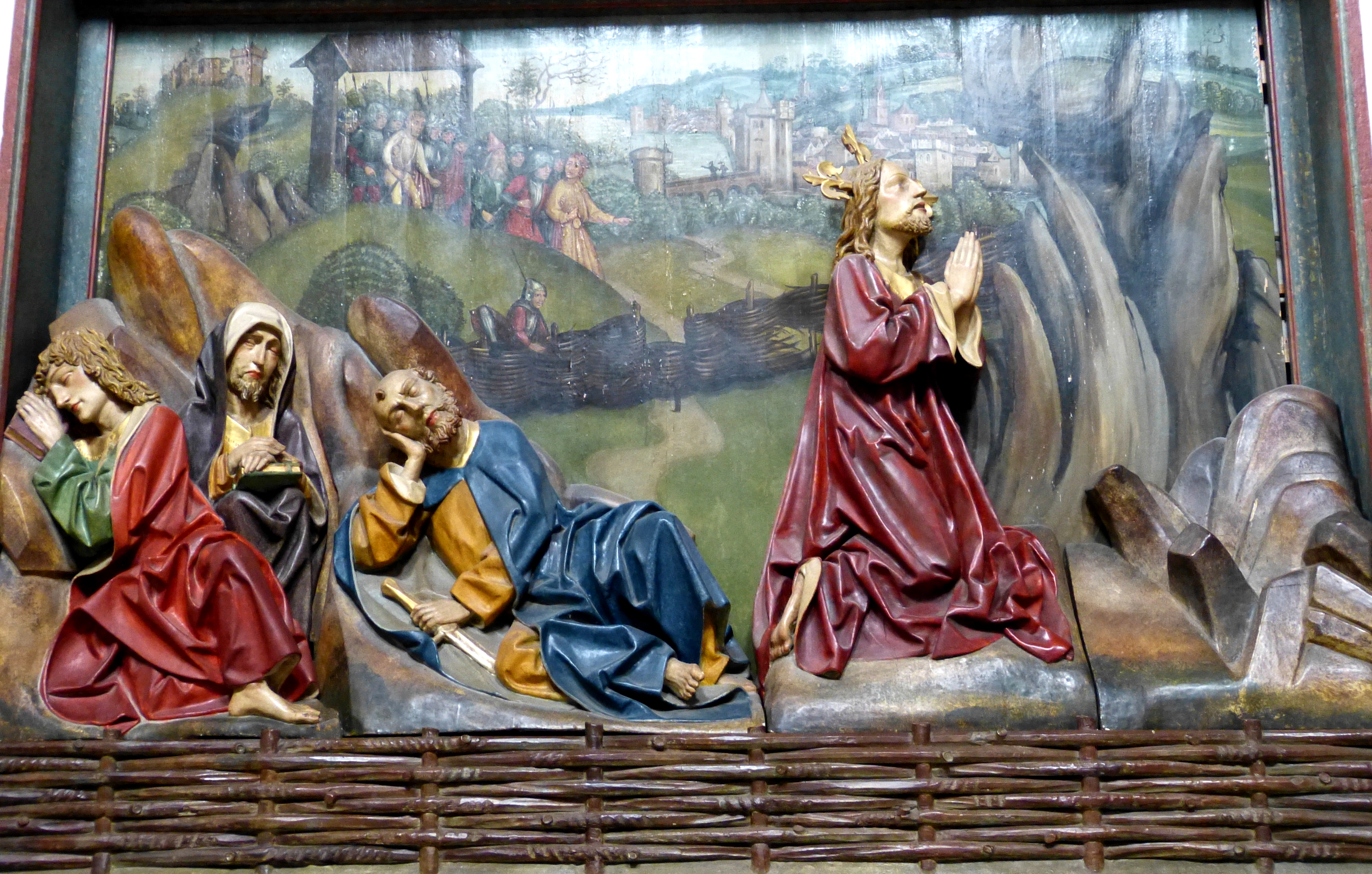
Mount of Olives, Reichenau Münster (1480)

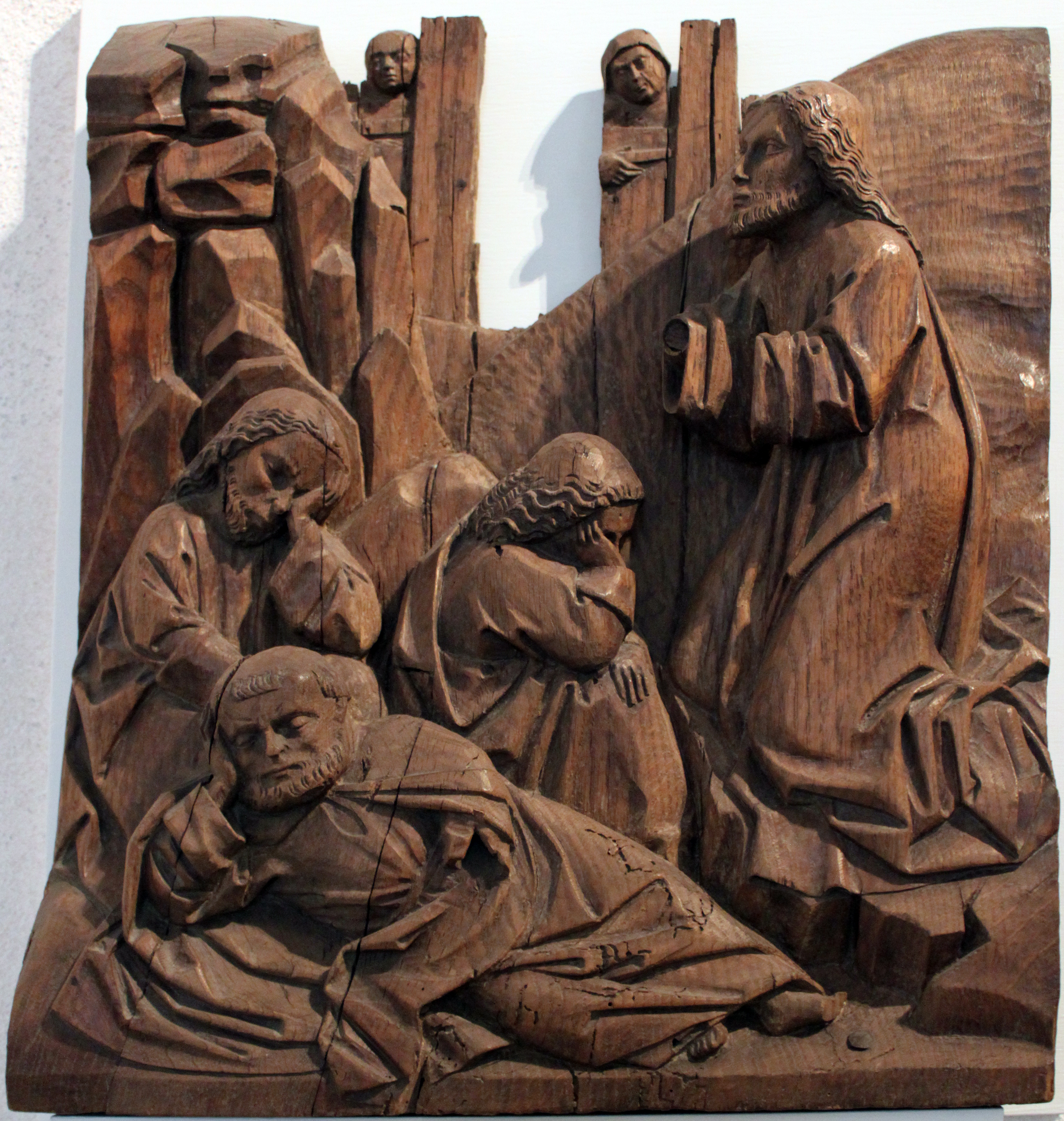
Mount of Olives, St. Marienkirche, Berlin (1470)

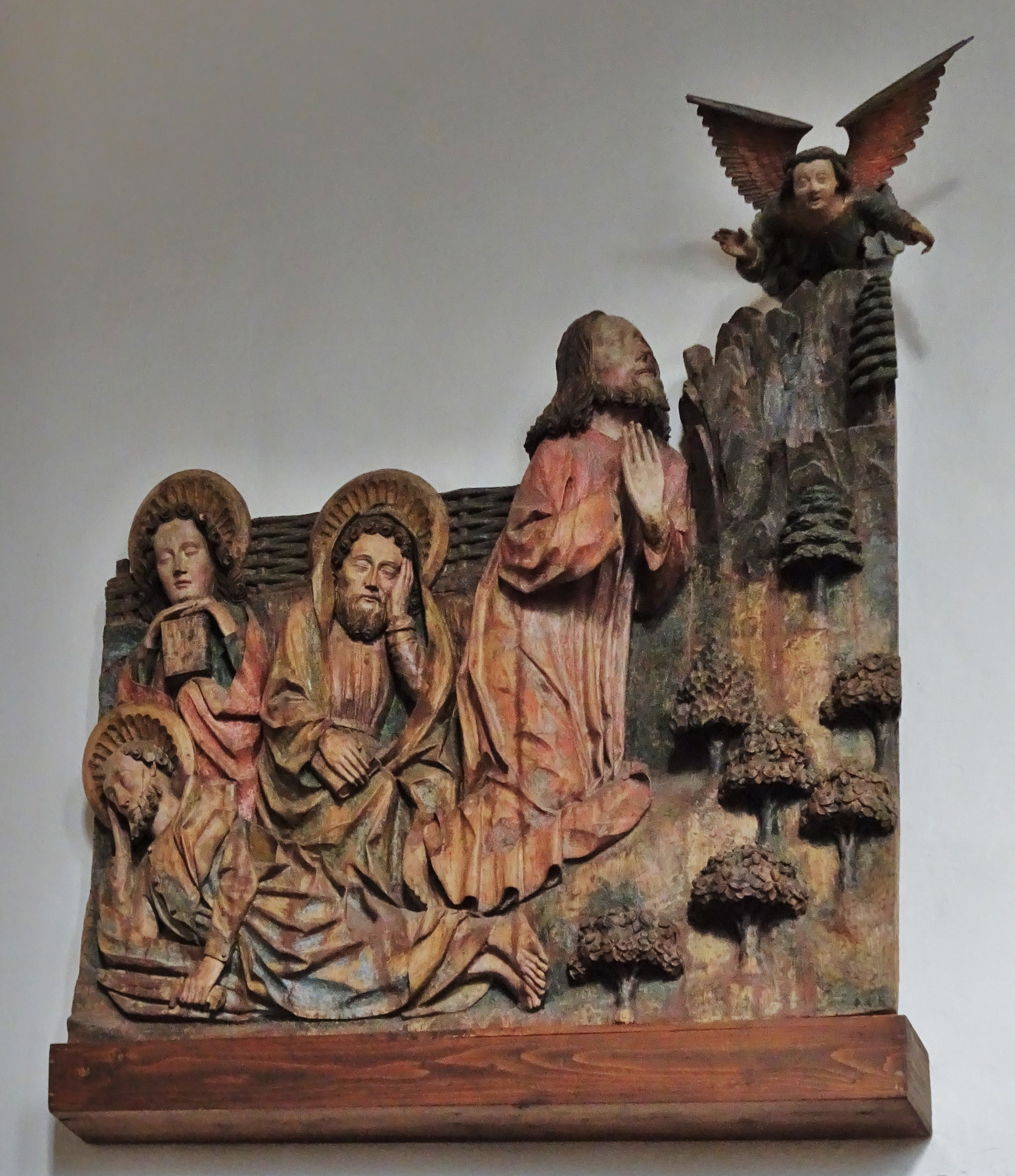
Mount of Olives, parish church of St. Martin (Obervellach) (late 15th century)

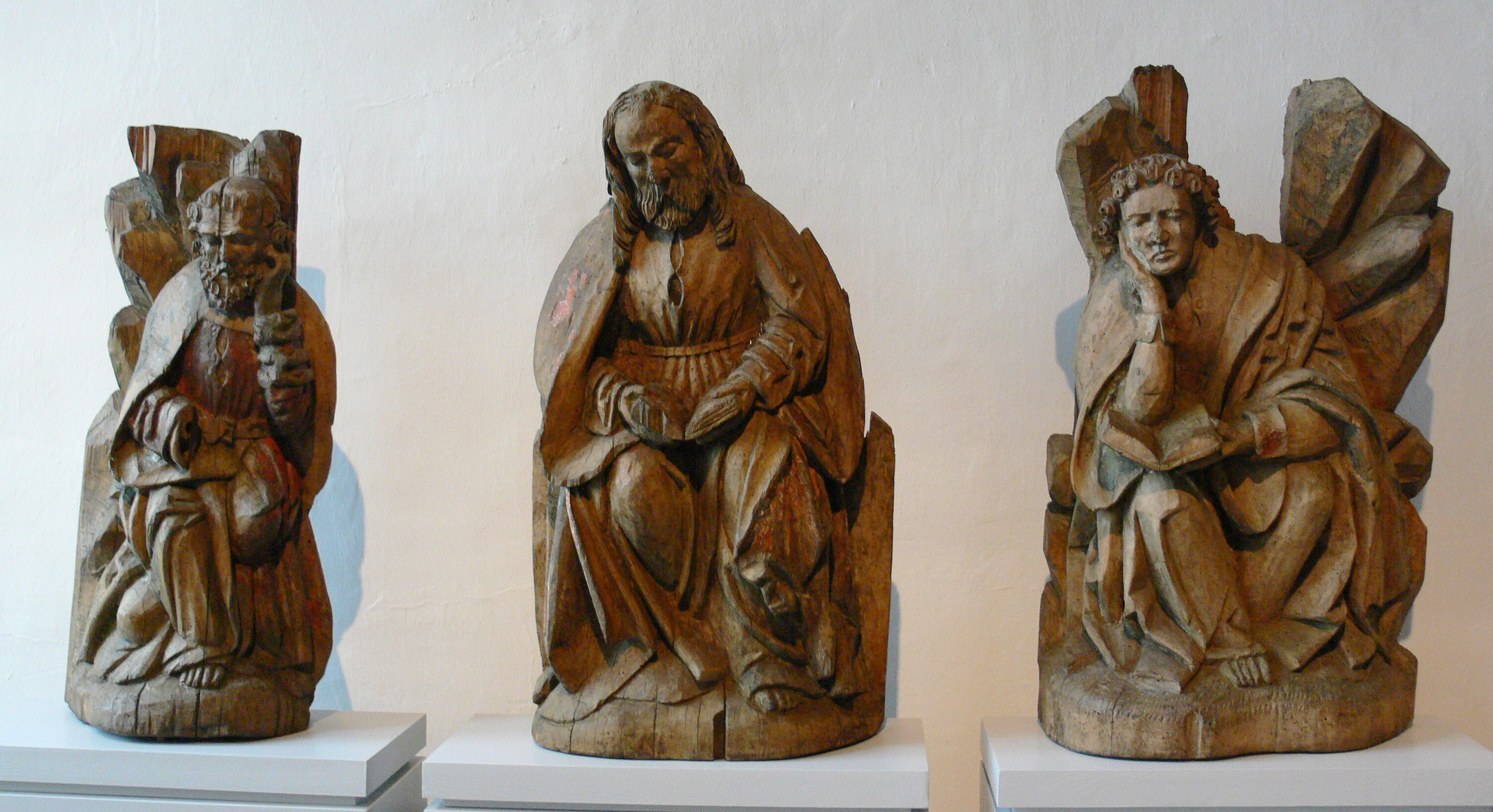
Mount of Olives, Weistropp (1500)

== Sources ==
- Matěj Kruntorád, Sculpture of the Olivet Mountain (Olomouc, Modřice, Jihlava) – restoration, current function and display, master thesis, Faculty of Arts MUNI Brno 2011
- Jiří Vykoukal (ed.), Gothic Art in the Cheb Region, Gallery of Fine Arts in Cheb 2009, ISBN 978-80-85016-92-5
- Marion Tietz-Strödel, Die Plastik in Eger von den frühen Gotik bis zur Renaissance, in: Lorenz Schreiner (ed.), Kunst in Eger. Stadt und Land, Vienna, Munich 1992, p. 282
- Jaromír Homolka, Late Gothic Sculpture, in: History of Czech Fine Arts, Academia Prague 1984
- Jana Ševčíková, Cheb Gothic Sculpture, Gallery of Fine Arts in Cheb 1975
