= Oravská Polhora =

- Municipality
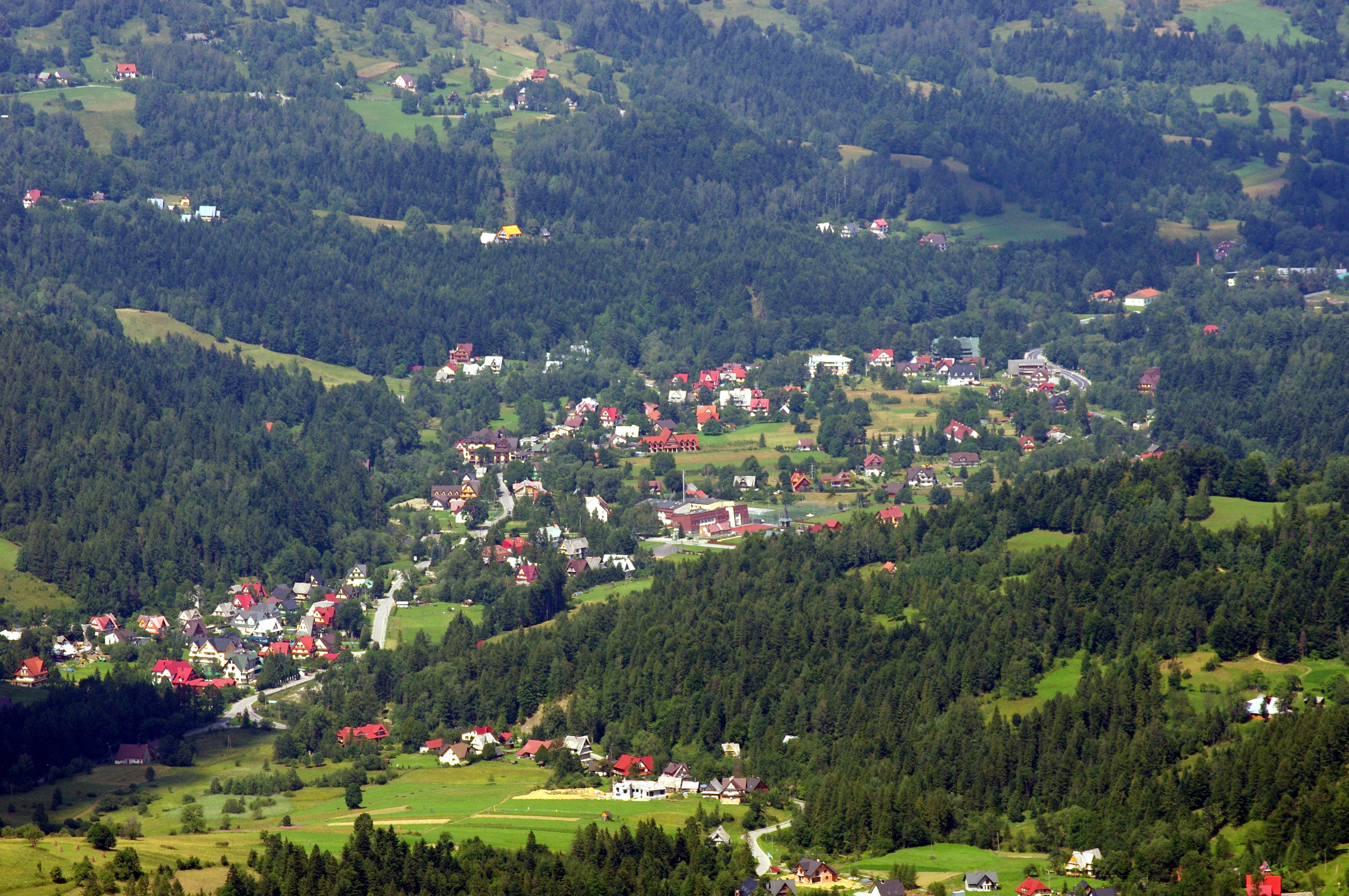

- Flag Coat of arms
- Interactive map of Oravská Polhora
- Location of Oravská Polhora in the Žilina Region Location of Oravská Polhora in Slovakia
- Coordinates: 49.52°N 19.45°E
- Country: Slovakia
- Region: Žilina Region
- District: Námestovo District
- First mentioned: 1580

Area
  - Total: 84.51 km^{2} (32.63 sq mi)
- Elevation: 686 m (2,251 ft)

Population (2025)
  - Total: 4,040
- Time zone: UTC+1 (CET)
  - Summer (DST): UTC+2 (CEST)
- Postal code: 294 7
- Area code: +421 43
- Vehicle registration plate (until 2022): NO
- Website: www.oravskapolhora.sk

Oravská Polhora (Hungarian: Polhora) is a large village and municipality in Námestovo District in the Žilina Region of northern Slovakia. The northernmost point of Slovakia is located close to the village.

== History ==
In 1550, the Upper Hungarian Chamber, believing that the right of the royal salt monopoly was being violated in the area, sent two royal commissioners from Hallstadt, Andreas Kraiser and Joseph Milaver, who were experts in salt mining, to Slaná Voda, modern day Oravská Polhora. They were accompanied by the administrator of the customs checkpoint from Tvrdošín. The commissioners wrote an extensive report on the visit to the springs and attached a manuscript map of the wider area, in which, Oravská Polhora can be seen. This was the first time the village was mentioned. The second mention of the village was in 1580, the third in 1588.

On October 1, 1938, following the Munich agreement, Polish troops, using Czechoslovak weakness to solve all border disputes in their favor, marched into the very northern tip of Oravská Polhora, annexing the Jalovec mountain peak.

== Geography ==
The municipality lies at an altitude of 686 metres (2,251 ft) and covers an area of 84.51 km^{2} (32.63 sq mi) (2025).

Oravská Polhora is the northernmost town in Slovakia. There is a border crossing in the eastern part of Oravská Polhora into the Polish village of Korbielów. The town is surrounded by the Oravské Beskydy mountain range, with its highest mountain being Babia Góra (1725 meters). Due to its mountainous nature, the town contains a lot of rivers. The biggest river in the town is Polhoranka.

The town contains a complex of forests and iodine-bromine springs, also known as spa salt water. In the 16-17th century, these springs were renowned locally, with rumors about them reaching even Vienna.

== Population ==
Population statistic (10 years)
| Year | 1995 | 2005 | 2015 | 2025 |
|---|---|---|---|---|
| Count | 3335 | 3650 | 3905 | 4040 |
| Difference | | +9.44% | +6.98% | +3.45% |

Population statistic
| Year | 2024 | 2025 |
|---|---|---|
| Count | 4025 | 4040 |
| Difference | | +0.37% |

It has a population of 4040 people (31 December 2025).

=== Ethnicity ===
Census 2021 (1+ %)
| Ethnicity | Number | Fraction |
|---|---|---|
| Slovak | 3916 | 98.54% |
| Not found out | 120 | 3.01% |
| Total | 3974 | |

In year 2021 was 3974 people by ethnicity 3916 as Slovak, 120 as Not found out, 14 as Czech, 12 as Polish, 4 as German, 2 as Hungarian, 1 as Ukrainian, 1 as Russian, 1 as Croatian and 1 as Albanian.

Note on population: The difference values of population numbers in the table "Population statistic" and in the sections "Ethnicity" & "Religion" is caused by the use of various statistical methods.

=== Religion ===
Census 2021 (1+ %)
| Religion | Number | Fraction |
|---|---|---|
| Roman Catholic Church | 3777 | 95.04% |
| None | 106 | 2.67% |
| Not found out | 42 | 1.06% |
| Total | 3974 | |

In year 2021 was 3974 people by religion 3777 from Roman Catholic Church, 106 from None, 42 from Not found out, 14 from Christian Congregations in Slovakia, 10 from Evangelical Church, 7 from Greek Catholic Church, 3 from Calvinist Church, 3 from Ad hoc movements, 2 from Islam, 2 from Other, 1 from Old Catholic Church, 1 from Eastern Orthodox Church, 1 from Paganism and natural spirituality, 1 from Other and not ascertained christian church, 1 from Jehovah's Witnesses, 1 from United Methodist Church, 1 from Buddhism and 1 from Baptists Church.

== Tourism ==
In Oravská Polhora, there is a possibility of skiing during winter in Polhorský hrádok.
