= St. Mary Magdalene's flood =

1342 flood in Central Europe

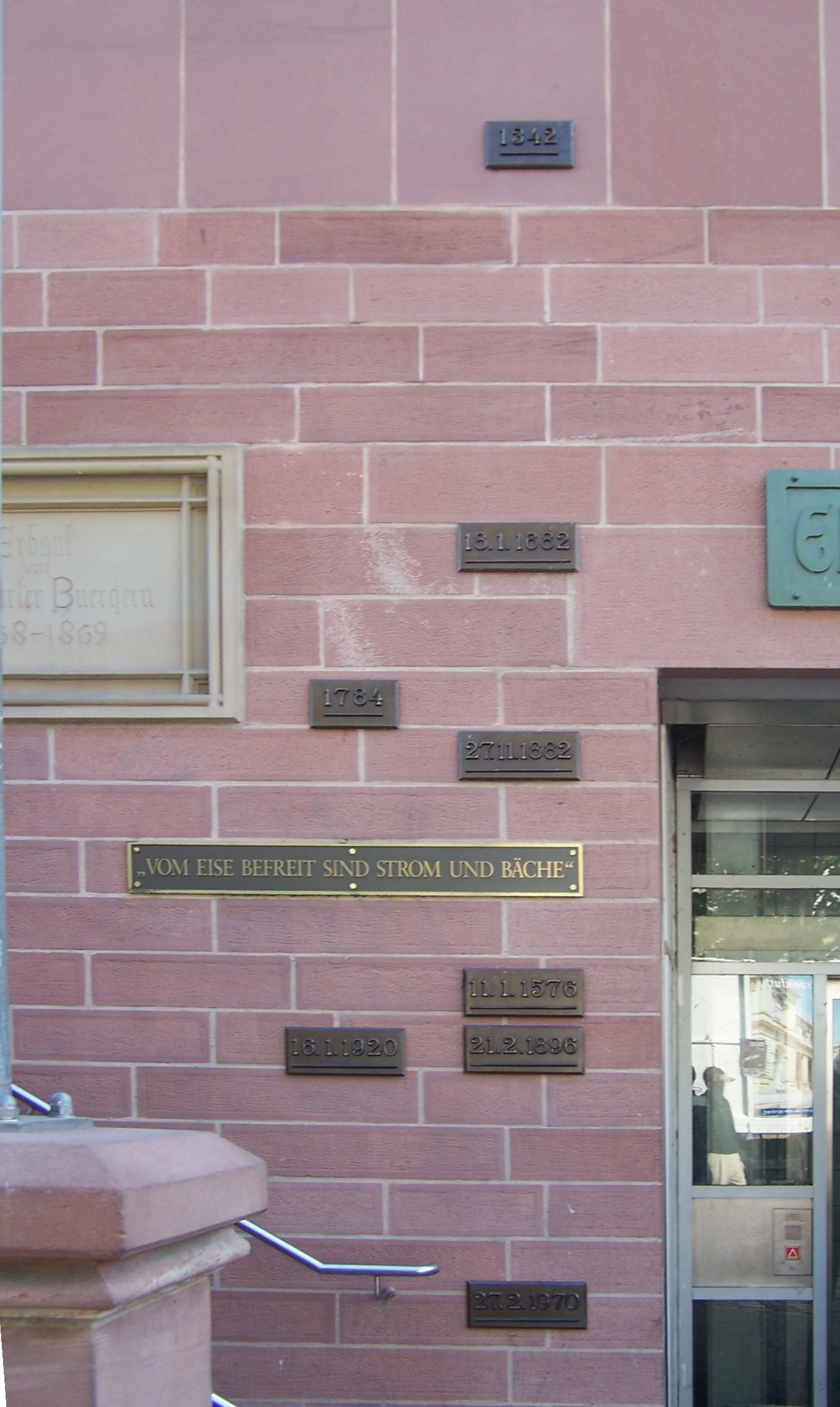
High water marks in Frankfurt/Main at the Eiserner Steg

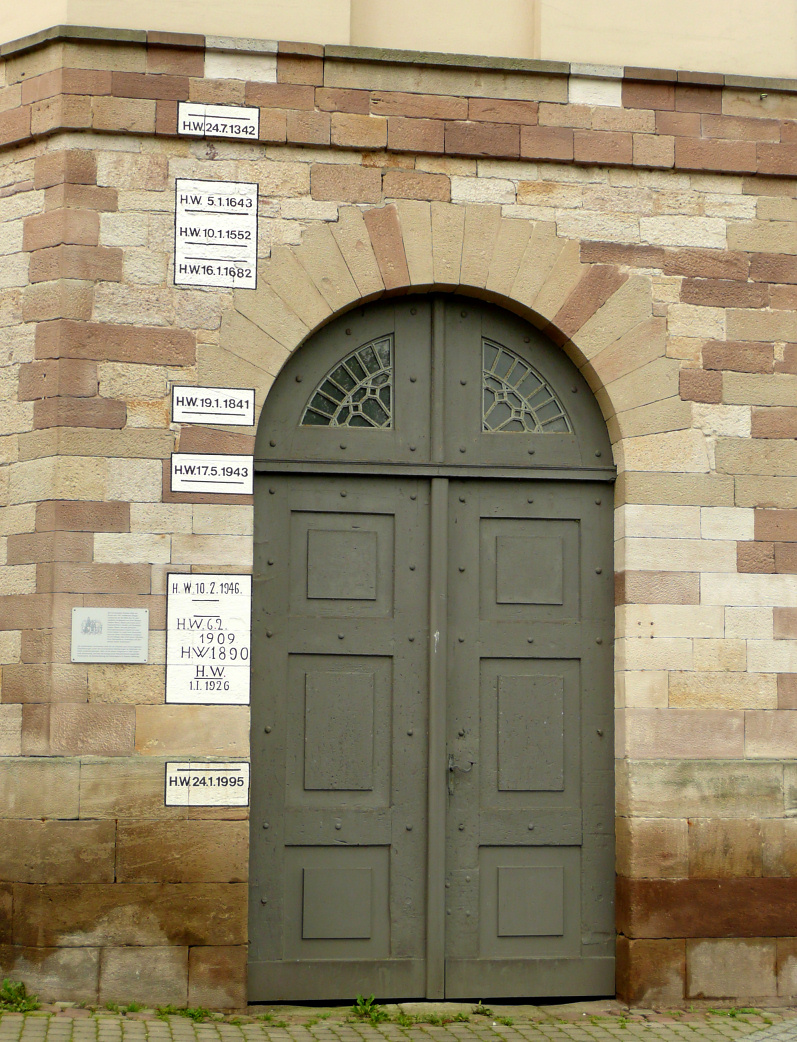
The high water mark at the "Packhof" in Hannoversch Münden indicates the St. Mary Magdalene's flood.

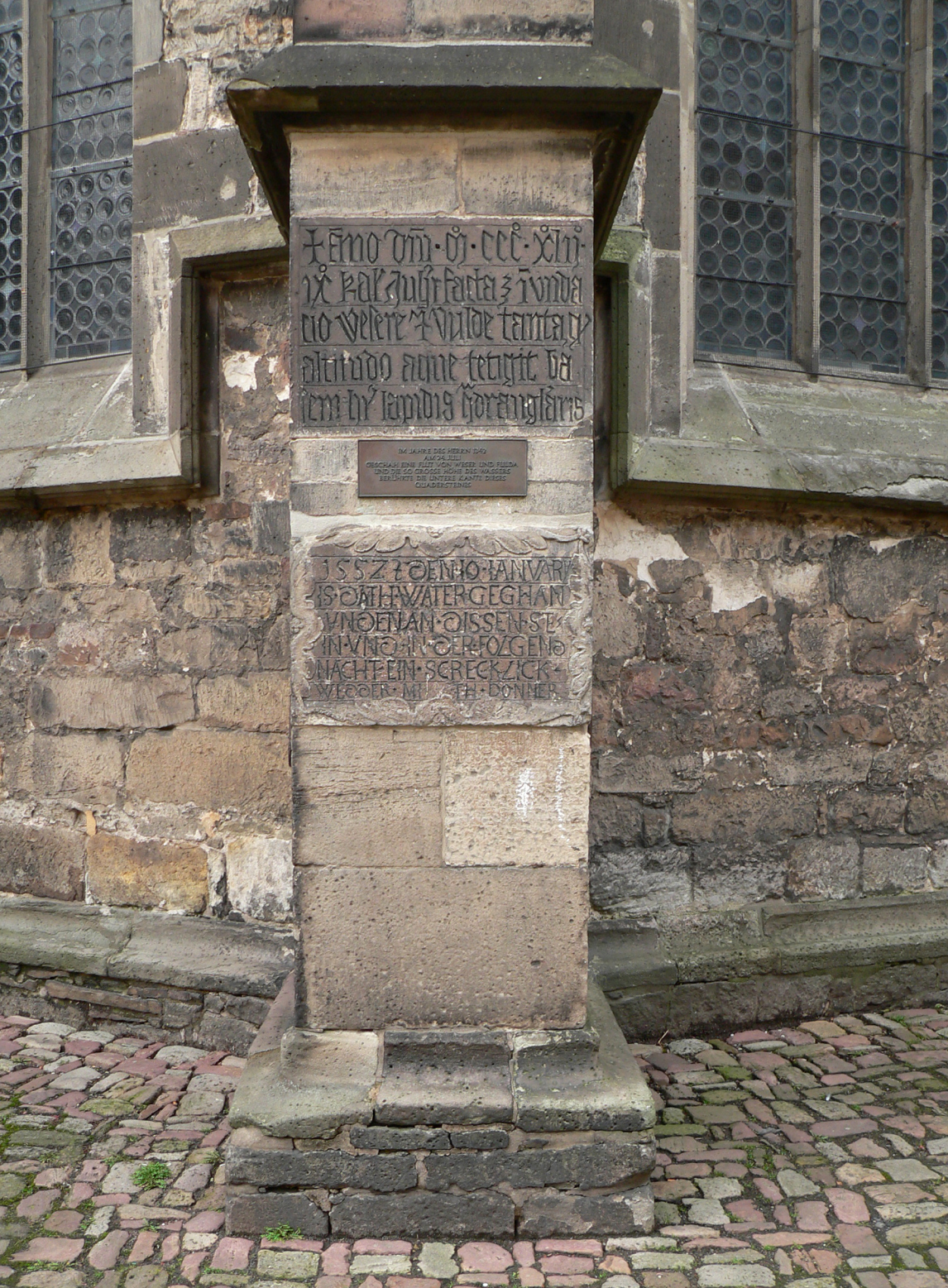
High water marks in Hannoversch Münden at the Blasius church

St. Mary Magdalene's flood (German: Magdalenenhochwasser / Magdalenenflut) was the largest recorded flood in central Europe with water levels exceeding those of the 2002 European floods. It occurred on and around the feast day of St. Mary Magdalene, 22 July in 1342.

Following the passage of a Genoa low, the rivers Rhine, Moselle, Main, Danube, Weser, Werra, Unstrut, Elbe, Vltava and their tributaries inundated large areas. Many towns such as Cologne, Mainz, Frankfurt am Main, Würzburg, Regensburg, Passau and Vienna were seriously damaged. Even the river Eider north of Hamburg flooded the surrounding land. The affected area extended to Carinthia and northern Italy.

It appears that after a prolonged hot and dry period, continuous rainfalls occurred, lasting several consecutive days and amounting to more than half of the mean yearly precipitation. Since the dry soil was unable to absorb such amounts of water, the surface runoff washed away large areas of fertile soil and caused huge inundations destroying houses, mills and bridges. In Würzburg, the then-famous Steinerne Brücke (Stone Bridge) was washed away, and in Cologne it is said that a rowing boat could pass over the city's fortifications. A precise number of casualties remains unknown, but it is believed that in the Danube area alone, 6,000 people perished. The results of the erosion can still be noticed today. The volume of the eroded soil during this short incident (a few days) is determined to be more than 13 billion metric tons, a volume that is washed away under normal climate conditions over a period of 2,000 years.

It is assumed that the loss of fertile soil led to a serious drop in agricultural production. In addition, the following summers were wet and cold, so that the population suffered from widespread famine. Whether the spreading of the Black Death between 1348 and 1350, killing at least a third of the population in central Europe, was facilitated by the weakened condition of the population is a matter of discussion.
