= Genoa low =

Weather phenomenon in Northern Italy

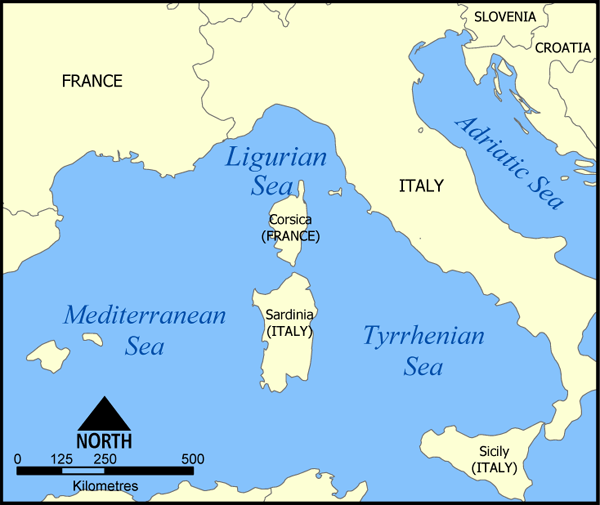
The Ligurian Sea

A Genoa low (also known as Genoa cyclogenesis, Ligurian depression, or V(5)-track cyclone) is a cyclone that forms or intensifies from a pre-existing cyclone to the south of the Alps over the Gulf of Genoa, Ligurian Sea, Po Valley and northern Adriatic.

== Cyclogenesis ==
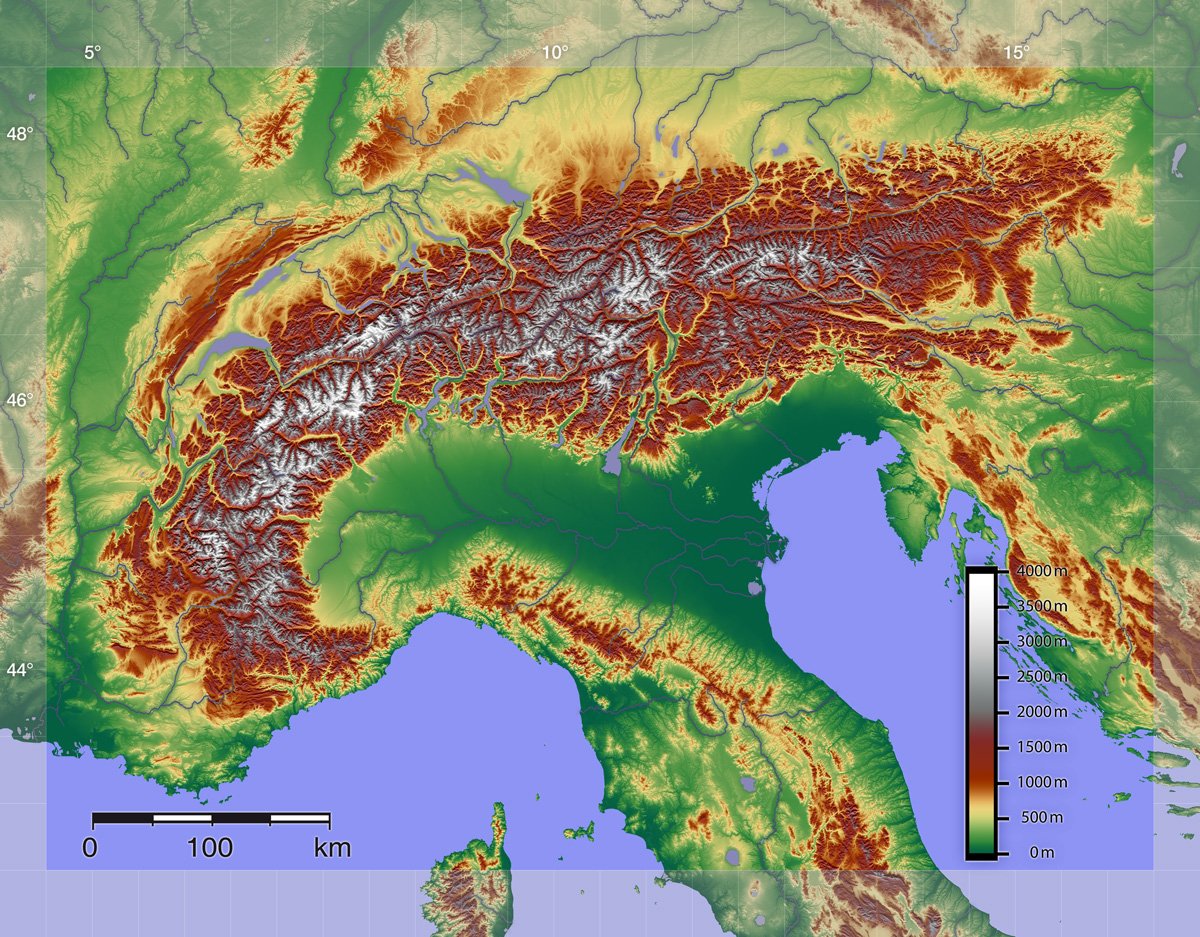
Relief map of Alpine region of Europe

The northwestern Mediterranean and the Gulf of Genoa in particular, are not only a transition area for passing cyclones, but are frequently areas of cyclogenesis. Low pressure areas move into or are formed as a result of North Atlantic air entering the Mediterranean Sea between the Alps and the Massif Central, via the Rhone Valley, or via the Carcassonne gap between the Pyrenees and Massif Central. This cold and moist air enters the Mediterranean basin, and is deflected by the high mountains of northwest Corsica, which divert the air mass to the northeast, triggering cool and wet Libeccio winds in response into the Ligurian Sea, which in turn hit the western Apennines located in the immediate vicinity of the sea.

Several factors that have special relevance in the development of depressions south of the Alps are:

- The thermal contrast between land and sea.
- Interaction between the polar front jet stream and the subtropical jet stream.
- Effect of northerly flow over the Alps, enhancing cyclogenetic activity along the southern slopes.
- Effect of the concave curvature of the southern slopes of the Alps, enhancing cyclonic formation.

A complex interaction is established between the orography of Liguria and the contrast between the cold and humid air mass and the warmer water of the Ligurian Sea, the process ends with the formation of a low pressure area over the Ligurian Sea, just near the city of Genoa. Genoa low cyclogenesis can occur at any time of year, though usually situated further south during the summer. Cyclogenesis is shifted to the east depending on the amount of cold air entering the Po Valley, and generally shifts to the Gulf of Venice when little enters the valley.

== Effects on climate ==
The depressions bear rain, often intense, on the Ligurian coast and hills of Tuscany, due to orographic lift which affects the southern side of the Apennines. The area of low pressure is slow moving, and may follow a trajectory from west to east, then going on to affect the regions of the Adriatic, or move from the north-west to south-east down along the Tyrrhenian Sea: in this last case, the structure will reach the same cyclonic area of formation of Tyrrhenian depressions, although not related to the latter.

=== Van Bebber cyclone tracks ===
Map of cyclone tracks over Europe, showing divergence of track V over the Ligurian sea and north Adriatic

Most Genoa lows remain stationary or leave a residual trough to the south of the Alps. Three principal tracks which they typically follow were identified by Wilhelm Jakob van Bebber who classified European windstorm tracks ("Zyklonenbahnen" in German) in 1891. To this date, track V of the latter group has remained in common use, unlike the large majority of van Bebber's tracks. The V track is linked to flooding events in central and eastern Europe, low pressure areas (south of the Alps) can track across France into the Mediterranean Sea where they pick up additional moisture, or form, and then move into central and eastern or southern Europe. the tracks diverge from the Genoa low formation area along the following pathways.

==== Vb track ====
Vb cyclones are rare events which occur on average only 2.3 times per year. A strong southwesterly flow in the upper atmosphere leads the lows to the northeast and north-northeast, ("Zugstrasse Vb" Van Bebber) towards the Vienna Basin. The lows then glide over colder and denser air from the northwest and are lifted orographically by the Bohemian Massif, Ore Mountains, Sudetes, Beskids and Tatra Mountains. The warm and moist air masses cause prolonged and abundant precipitation during slow Meridional flow over the upper catchments of both the southern and northern European Watershed. Flooding then progresses down their major rivers of central Europe. This 'Vb-track' displays a high potential for large summer floods in Europe. Although the link between large summer floods and the Vb track have also been described as having a significant but weak correlation.

Examples of flooding events which follow this pattern are:

- St. Mary Magdalene's flood
- 1997 Central European flood from the lows "Xolska" and "Zoe".
- 2002 European floods from the lows "Hanne" and "Ilse".
- 2005 European floods
- 2009 European floods
- 2010 Central European floods from the low "Yolanda".
- 2013 European floods
- 2014 Southeast Europe floods

Due to the expected warming of the future climate it is predicted that the annuality of Vb-cyclones will decrease. The decrease in Vb-cyclones could be caused by the shift of the cyclone track over Europe to the north. Modelling has shown that precipitation from future Vb-cyclones will have a greater impact on the eastern coasts of the Mediterranean Sea and a lesser impact on the Alpine region compared to the precipitation pattern of current Vb-cyclones.

==== Vc track ====
The Vc track draws the lows across the Panonian plain towards the Carpathian Mountains and on towards western Ukraine and Moldova.

==== Vd track ====
If there is a strong anticyclone over the Balkans, Turkey and the Black Sea, the usual track of the low is southeasterly, skirting the northern coast of the Mediterranean Sea. It is this track that moves the low across the Tyrrhenian Sea. Even after the primary low has moved out of the Tyrrhenian Sea-central Mediterranean area, if a residual trough remains south of the Alps, as is often the case, new centers can develop and occasionally move southeastward along the west coast of Italy. It is also common that a Genoa Low that has moved to the southwest will stall and become stationary, just to the west of the foot of the Italian boot, and this often will be associated with new low centers developing to the east over the Ionian Sea. In this case, gale force Bora are typically generated by the time the depression moves into the Ionian Sea.

== See also ==
- Mediterranean tropical-like cyclone
