= Čirč =

Village and municipality in Slovakia

- Municipality
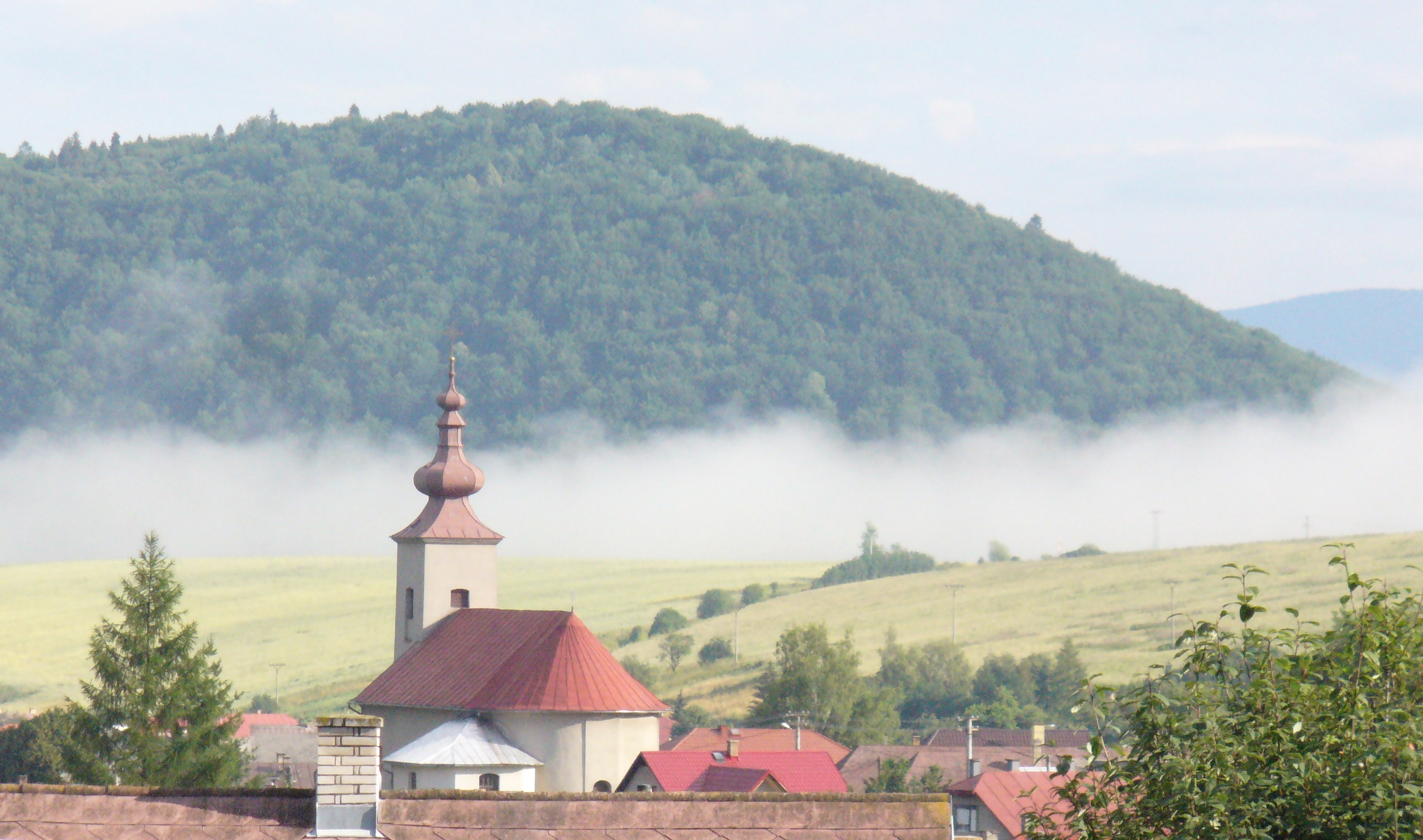

- Flag

- Location of Čirč in the Prešov Region Location of Čirč in Slovakia
- Coordinates: 49.28°N 20.92°E
- Country: Slovakia
- Region: Prešov Region
- District: Stará Ľubovňa District
- First mentioned: 1330

Area
  - Total: 20.18 km^{2} (7.79 sq mi)
- Elevation: 506 m (1,660 ft)

Population (2025)
  - Total: 1,445
- Time zone: UTC+1 (CET)
  - Summer (DST): UTC+2 (CEST)
- Postal code: 654 2
- Area code: +421 52
- Vehicle registration plate (until 2022): SL
- Website: circ.sk

Aerial photo of Čirč

Čirč (Rusyn: Чірч; Hungarian: Csércs) is a village and municipality in Stará Ľubovňa District in the Prešov Region of northern Slovakia.

== History ==
In historical records the village was first mentioned in 1773. Before the establishment of independent Czechoslovakia in 1918, Čirč was part of Sáros County within the Kingdom of Hungary. From 1939 to 1945, it was part of the Slovak Republic. On 21 January 1945, the Red Army dislodged the Wehrmacht from Čirč and it was once again part of Czechoslovakia.

== Geography ==
The municipality lies at an altitude of 506 metres (1,660 ft) and covers an area of 20.18 km^{2} (7.79 sq mi) (2025).

== Population ==
Population statistic (10 years)
Year	1995	2005	2015	2025
Count	1037	1165	1267	1445
Difference		+12.34%	+8.75%	+14.04%

Population statistic
Year	2024	2025
Count	1437	1445
Difference		+0.55%

It has a population of 1445 people (31 December 2025).

=== Ethnicity ===
Census 2021 (1+ %)
Ethnicity	Number	Fraction
Slovak	947	71.2%
Rusyn	677	50.9%
Romani	201	15.11%
Not found out	100	7.51%
Total	1330	

In year 2021 was 1330 people by ethnicity 947 as Slovak, 677 as Rusyn, 201 as Romani, 100 as Not found out, 4 as Czech, 3 as Ukrainian and 2 as Polish.

Note on population: The difference values of population numbers in the table "Population statistic" and in the sections "Ethnicity" & "Religion" is caused by the use of various statistical methods.

=== Religion ===
Census 2021 (1+ %)
Religion	Number	Fraction
Greek Catholic Church	1099	82.63%
Roman Catholic Church	119	8.95%
Not found out	77	5.79%
None	15	1.13%
Total	1330	

In year 2021 was 1330 people by religion 1099 from Greek Catholic Church, 119 from Roman Catholic Church, 77 from Not found out, 15 from None, 9 from Eastern Orthodox Church, 3 from Christian Congregations in Slovakia, 2 from Other and not ascertained christian church, 2 from Evangelical Church, 1 from Paganism and natural spirituality, 1 from Other, 1 from Baptists Church and 1 from Ad hoc movements.

== Genealogical resources ==
The records for genealogical research are available at the state archive "Statny Archiv in Presov, Slovakia"

- Roman Catholic church records (births/marriages/deaths): 1777-1949 (parish B)
- Greek Catholic church records (births/marriages/deaths): 1753-1933 (parish A)

== See also ==
- List of municipalities and towns in Slovakia
