= Iodine bromide =

Iodine bromide may refer to:

- Iodine monobromide, IBr
- Iodine tribromide, IBr_{3}
