= Černotín =

- Municipality
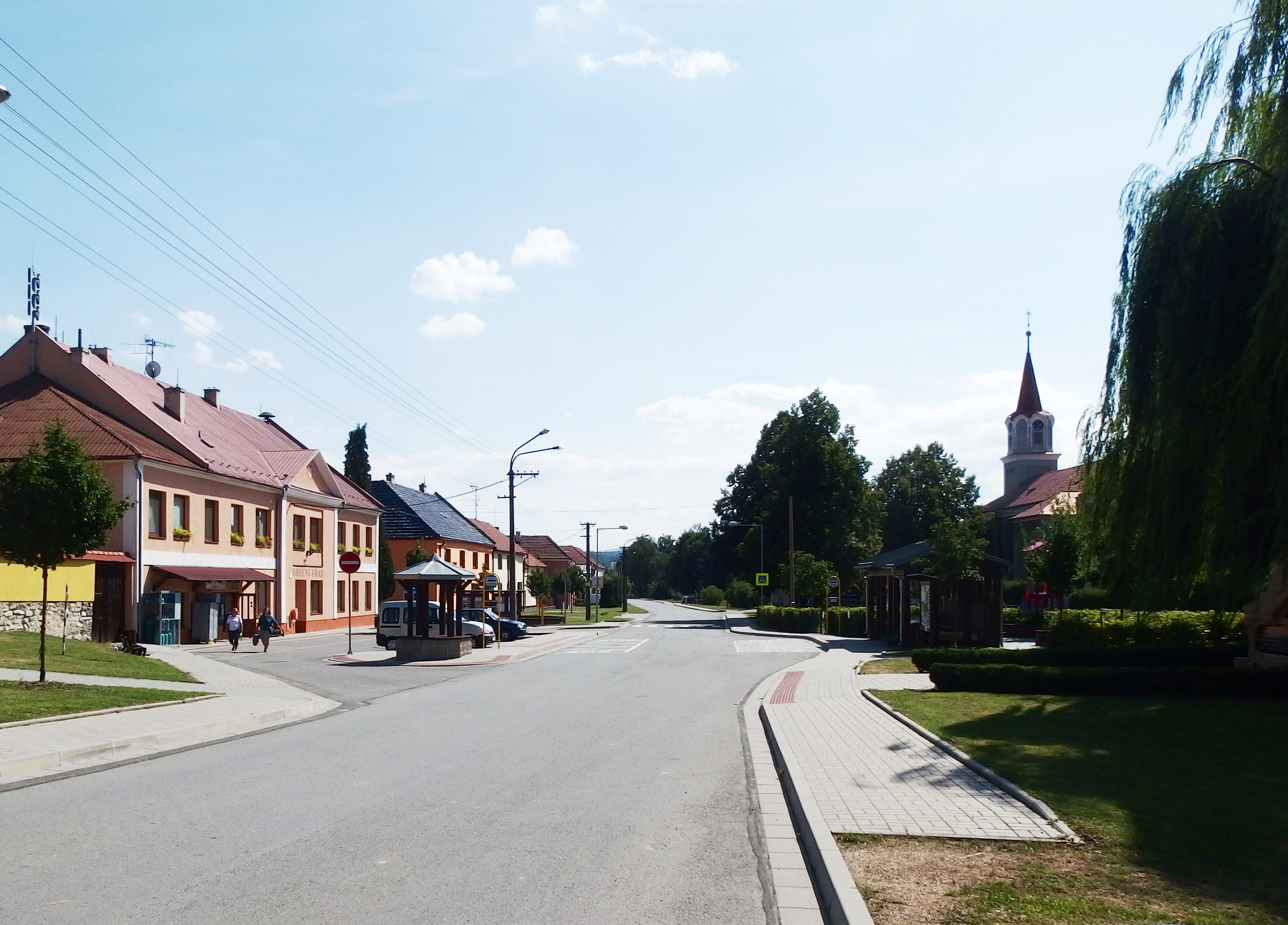
- Centre of Černotín

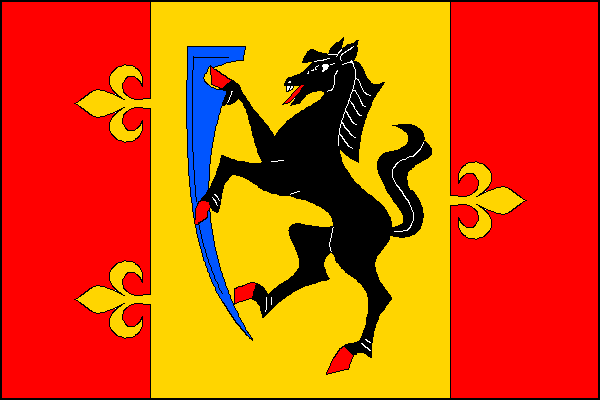
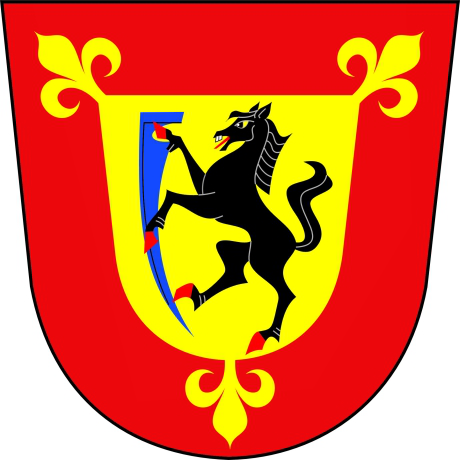
- Flag Coat of arms

- Location in the Czech Republic
- Coordinates: 49°31′55″N 17°46′20″E
- Country: Czech Republic
- Region: Olomouc
- District: Přerov
- First mentioned: 1406

Area
  - Total: 8.32 km^{2} (3.21 sq mi)
- Elevation: 259 m (850 ft)

Population (2026-01-01)
  - Total: 816
  - Density: 98.1/km^{2} (254/sq mi)
- Time zone: UTC+1 (CET)
  - Summer (DST): UTC+2 (CEST)
- Postal code: 753 68
- Website: www.cernotin.cz

Černotín is a municipality and village in Přerov District in the Olomouc Region of the Czech Republic. It has about 800 inhabitants.

Černotín lies approximately 25 kilometres (16 mi) east of Přerov, 39 km (24 mi) east of Olomouc, and 249 km (155 mi) east of Prague.

== Administrative division ==
Černotín consists of two municipal parts (in brackets population according to the 2021 census):

- Černotín (488)
- Hluzov (220)

== Demographics ==
Historical population
| Year | Pop. | ±% |
|---|---|---|
| 1869 | 701 | — |
| 1880 | 799 | +14.0% |
| 1890 | 846 | +5.9% |
| 1900 | 860 | +1.7% |
| 1910 | 944 | +9.8% |
| 1921 | 921 | −2.4% |
| 1930 | 856 | −7.1% |
| 1950 | 782 | −8.6% |
| 1961 | 843 | +7.8% |
| 1970 | 790 | −6.3% |
| 1980 | 749 | −5.2% |
| 1991 | 696 | −7.1% |
| 2001 | 750 | +7.8% |
| 2011 | 735 | −2.0% |
| 2021 | 708 | −3.7% |
Source: Censuses
