= 2002 European floods =

Major European floods in August 2002

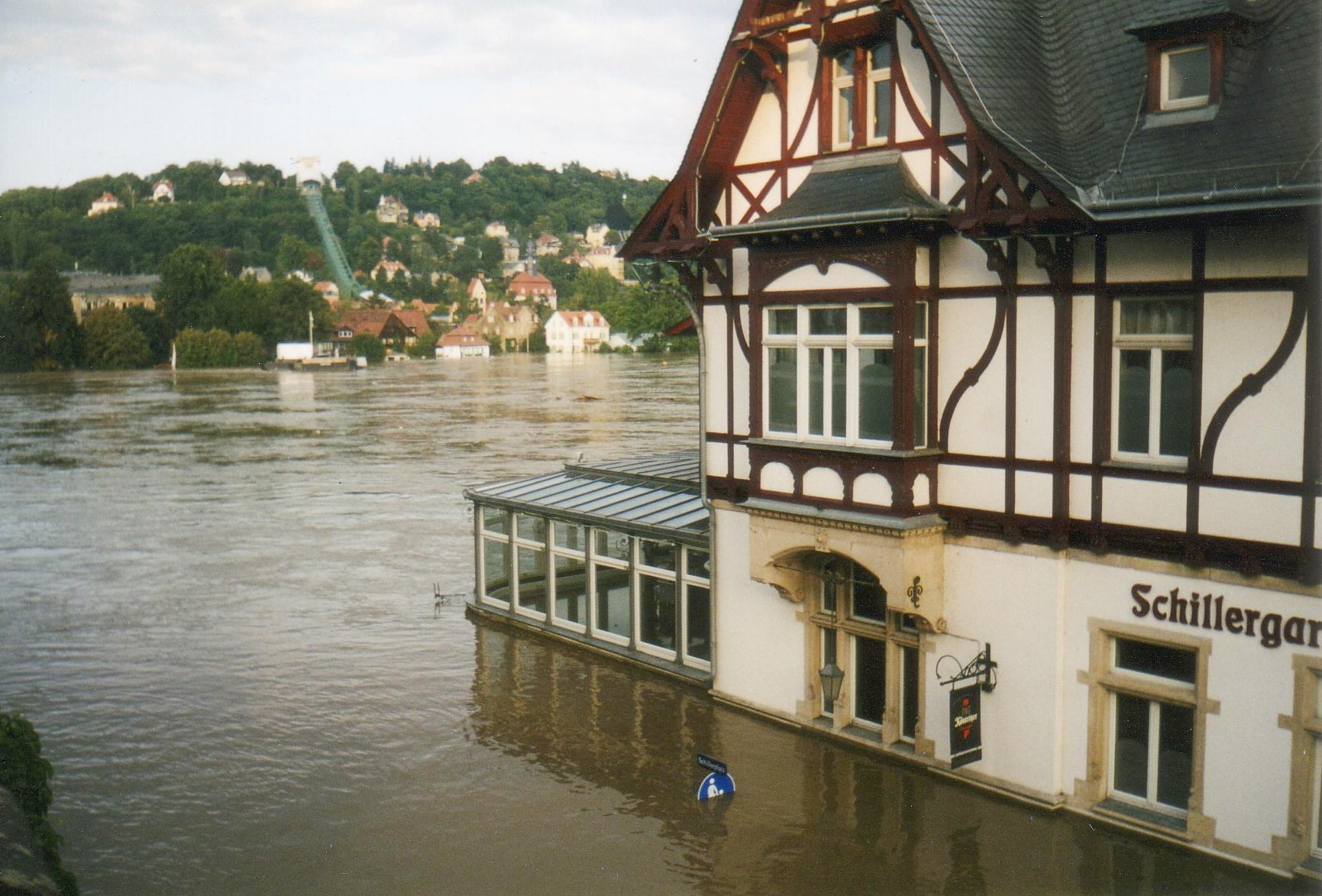
- Flooded Elbe in Dresden August 2002

Meteorological history
- Duration: August 2002

Overall effects
- Fatalities: 232
- Damage: €27.7 billion
- Areas affected: Austria; Croatia; Czech Republic; Germany; Hungary; Romania; Russia; Slovakia; Italy; Spain; Ukraine; Bulgaria

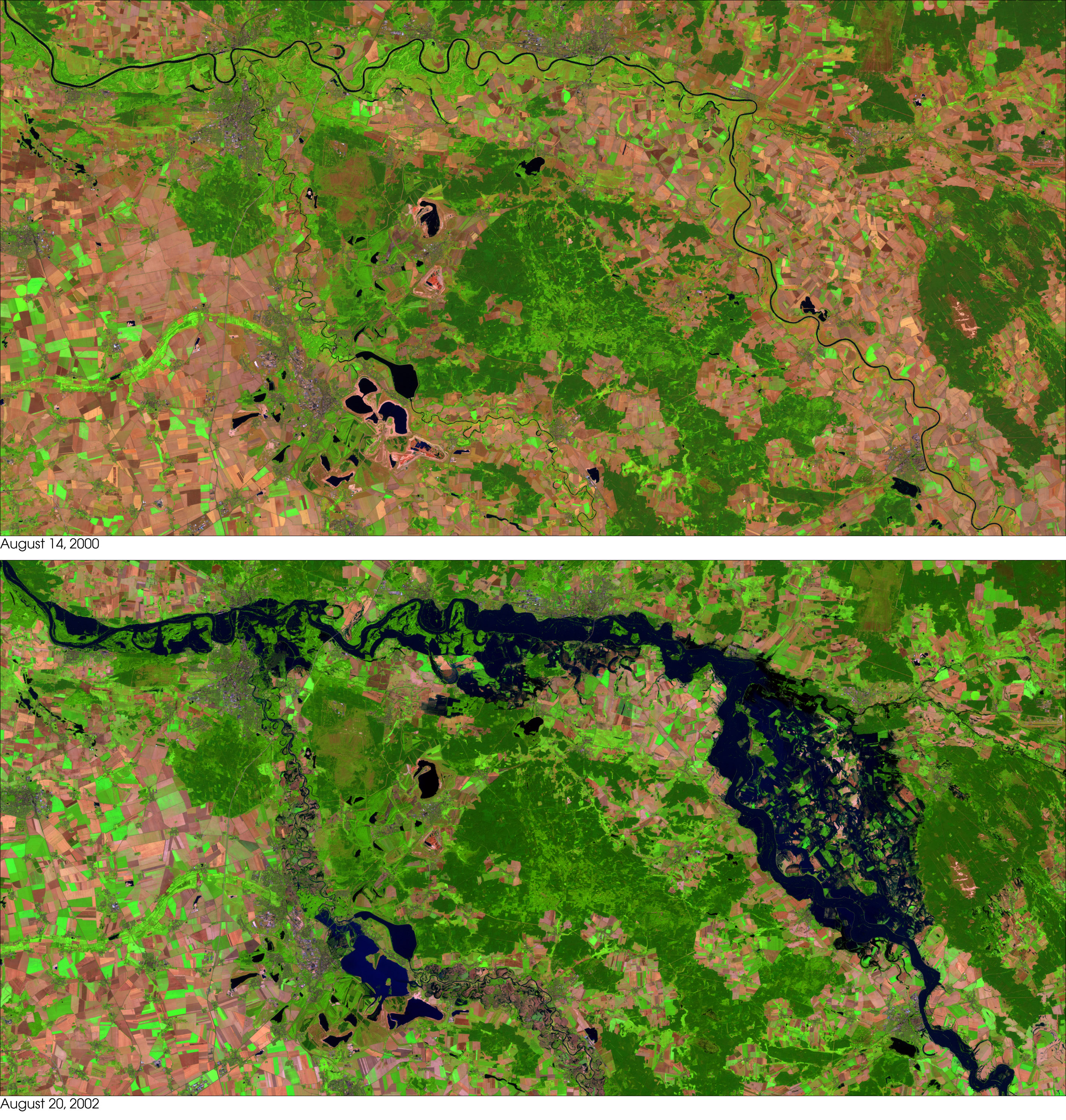
The Elbe before and after the 2002 flood

In August 2002, a week of intense rainfall produced flooding across a large portion of Europe. It reached the Czech Republic, Italy, Spain, Austria, Germany, Slovakia, Hungary, Romania, Bulgaria, Croatia, Ukraine and Russia. The event killed 232 people and left €27.7 billion (US$27.115 billion) in damage. The flood was of a magnitude expected to occur roughly once a century. Flood heights unknown since St. Mary Magdalene's flood were recorded.

== Development ==
Flooding resulted from the passage of two Genoa low pressure systems (named Hanne and Ilse by the Free University of Berlin) which brought warm moist air from the Mediterranean northwards. The effects of El Niño may have contributed. The floods gradually moved eastwards along the Danube, although the damage in the large cities on its shores was not as severe as in the areas affected by the floods later.

When the rainfall moved northeast to the Bohemian Forest and the source areas of the Elbe and Vltava rivers, the results were catastrophic water levels first in the Austrian areas of Mühlviertel and Waldviertel and later in the Czech Republic, Thuringia and Saxony. Several villages in Northern Bohemia, Thuringia and Saxony were more or less destroyed by rivers changing their courses or massively overflowing their banks.

== Areas affected ==
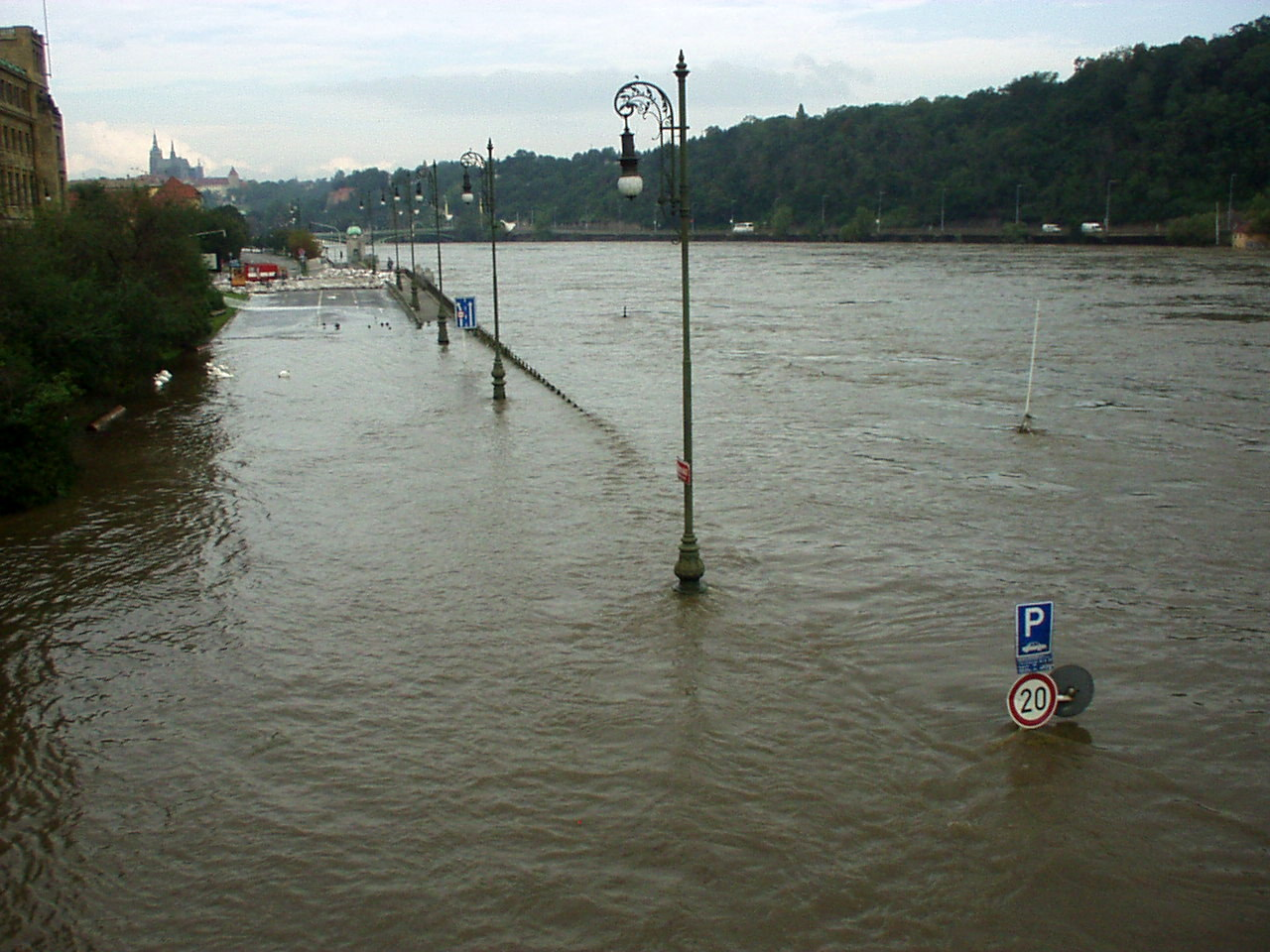
Flooding in Prague

The floods were part of a larger system that was also affecting Asia. Several rivers in the region, including the Vltava, Elbe and Danube reached record highs.

=== Czech Republic ===
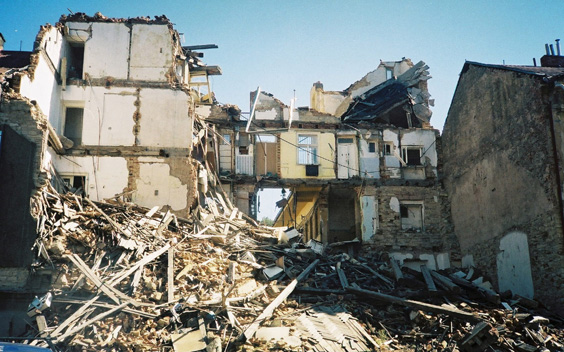
Flood damage in the Karlin district of Prague

Flooded Prague metro network in 2002

Prague received significant damage from what were deemed to be the worst floods ever to hit the capital. The flow of Vltava culminated at 5300 m^{3}/s, 20% more than during the flood of 1845. Among the regions of the capital city most severely affected were Karlín, Kampa, Holešovice and Libeň, where there was a significant risk of building collapse. Most of Prague's artwork was saved due to warning of high water levels, but there was significant damage to the Prague Metro subway system, much of which was completely flooded, as well as to the historic Prague pneumatic post, which was forced to cease operation.

The collections of the National Library of the Czech Republic and the Prague Municipal Library were inundated. Despite the chaos and lack of preparation, Czech librarians and archivists were able to send a significant percentage of their flooded collections to be frozen, thus staving off immediate destruction of these historic collections by water or mold.

The Terezín Memorial and Prague's Jewish Quarter also received significant damage, a part of the estimated $30 million in damage to Czech cultural sites including: the Prague Municipal Library, Malá Strana, the National Theatre and Terezín.

The evacuations before the worst of the flooding have been cited as one of the reasons for relatively little loss of life in the capital. An estimated 40,000 people were evacuated from Prague. Among the animal deaths resulting from the flood was Gaston, a sea lion from the Prague Zoo who swam to Germany following the flooding of his aquarium. For some time, it was believed he would survive, but he died following capture in Dresden.

In total, 17 people died in the Czech Republic due to the floods, and damage from the flood was estimated at between 70 and 73 billion Czech koruna. The damage to the Prague Metro has been estimated at 7 billion Kč.

=== Germany ===
Germany was the hardest hit, with over two-thirds of the flood's total losses. The 10 years of renovation work that had been carried out since reunification in 1990 in the town of Grimma, in the former East Germany, were said to have been destroyed in one night.

Dresden received significant damage when the Elbe River reached an all-time high of 9.4 meters (30.8 feet). More than 30,000 people were evacuated from various neighborhoods throughout the city and some of the city's cultural landmarks were considered to be at risk.

Extensive damage, of around 42 million euros, was caused to Dresden Main Station where floods went through the station concourse and out through the other end.

Dresden's Zwinger Palace, home to a significant number of Europe's artistic treasures including Raphael's Sistine Madonna, was at risk from the flooding Elbe; however, all of the artwork was saved. The Semper Opera House also suffered damage.

=== Russia ===
The Black Sea Coast region was among the most severely hit regions of Russia with significant loss of life due to a tornado that hit the tourist region and destroyed homes. This was after earlier summer floods in southern Russia. All told, damage in the region was calculated at more than $400 million.

== Regions spared ==
Flooding in Budapest

Although all of Europe was affected to some degree by the record rainfall, some cities were spared the severe flooding that hit Dresden and Prague.

Although the Danube reached record highs, both Bratislava and Vienna were spared significant flooding. Bratislava's flood protection measures withstood the water, while it was generally believed that Vienna was spared significant damage due to the city's engineering, and plans were undertaken to see if such work could be applied to the other cities as well.

== After-effects ==
Once the water levels returned to normal and residents returned to their homes, they faced not only the damage left by the flood waters but also threats of disease due to decaying waste and food. The danger increased due to flooding of sewage treatment plants and the risk of damage to chemical plants.

European leaders gathered in Berlin to discuss the effects of the floods and to create a better understanding of how to prevent such disasters in the future. This meeting garnered some criticism, as Russia, which had suffered significant damage, was not invited to what was billed as a meeting of EU members and future members. The EU leaders did promise aid to the central European countries that suffered the most under the floods with money coming from the EU's structural budget and this outreach to non-members was seen as symbolic to portray a truly united Europe.

== See also ==
- List of floods in Europe
- 2002 Glasgow floods
- European Flood Alert System
- German Flood Service Medal (2002)
