= Valencia flood =

Valencia flood may refer to two severe floods in Valencia, Spain:

- 1957 Valencia flood
- 2024 Spain floods
