= Top Cable =

- Type: Private
- Industry: Electrical equipment
- Founded: 1985; 41 years ago in Barcelona, Spain
- Founders: Albert Parera Martinell; Jordi Parera Martinell; Josep Parera Martinell; Àlex Parera Martinell
- Headquarters: Rubí, Catalonia, Spain
- Area served: Worldwide
- Key people: Jordi Parera (President)
- Products: Low, medium and high voltage electrical cables Fiber optic cables
- Website: topcable.com

Top Cable is a Spanish manufacturer of electrical cables headquartered in Rubí, Catalonia.

== History ==
Top Cable was founded in 1985 by the four Parera Martinell brothers, Albert, Jordi, Josep and Àlex, in Barcelona, building on the cable manufacturing experience of their father, Albert Parera Amposta, who had founded a small cable production business in Caracas, Venezuela in the 1950s. Initially established as Alcabe, the company built its first factory in Rubí, Barcelona in 1986 and began commercial cable sales the following year.

In 1988, Top Cable opened branches in Valencia and Madrid, and in 1991 it expanded production capacity by setting up Orbitel Cables. Top Cable established its first international subsidiary in France in 1992, followed by Top Cable Chile in 1998, with later subsidiaries opening in Denmark, the Netherlands, Poland and Singapore. A new factory was inaugurated in Rubí in 1997.

In 2001, Top Cable built a robotised logistics centre in Rubí. In 2006, Top Cable began producing medium-voltage cables, and in 2007 inaugurated the Akan Cables factory in Sallent (Barcelona) for medium-voltage cable manufacturing.

In 2014, Top Cable established Iconel in Binaced (Huesca), its first manufacturing facility outside Catalonia.

In 2019, the Sallent city council approved a modification to the municipal urban-planning plan to allow Top Cable to consolidate and expand its production site at the Plans de la Sala industrial estate. In 2020, the company set up Akan Compounds for high-tech compounding, and in 2021 launched the Akson factory in Sallent for rubber and photovoltaic cables. In the same year, the company began rolling out a sustainability programme, focused on solar self-consumption, waste recycling and sustainable packaging.

== Operations ==
Top Cable manufactures and distributes power cables, armoured cables, earth cables, control and screened cables, safety cables, fire-resistant cables, rubber cables, solar cables, medium- and high-voltage cables, marine cables, electric vehicle infrastructure cables, special cables and fiber optic cables, with conductors manufactured in copper or aluminium.

Top Cable is headquartered in Rubí and operates production facilities in Rubí and Sallent in the Province of Barcelona, Bellpuig in the Province of Lleida, and Binaced in the Province of Huesca. Its subsidiaries include Alcabe, Orbitel Cables, Akan Cables, Akson Cables, Akan Compounds and Iconel.
