= 1962 Vallès floods =

Floods in Spain

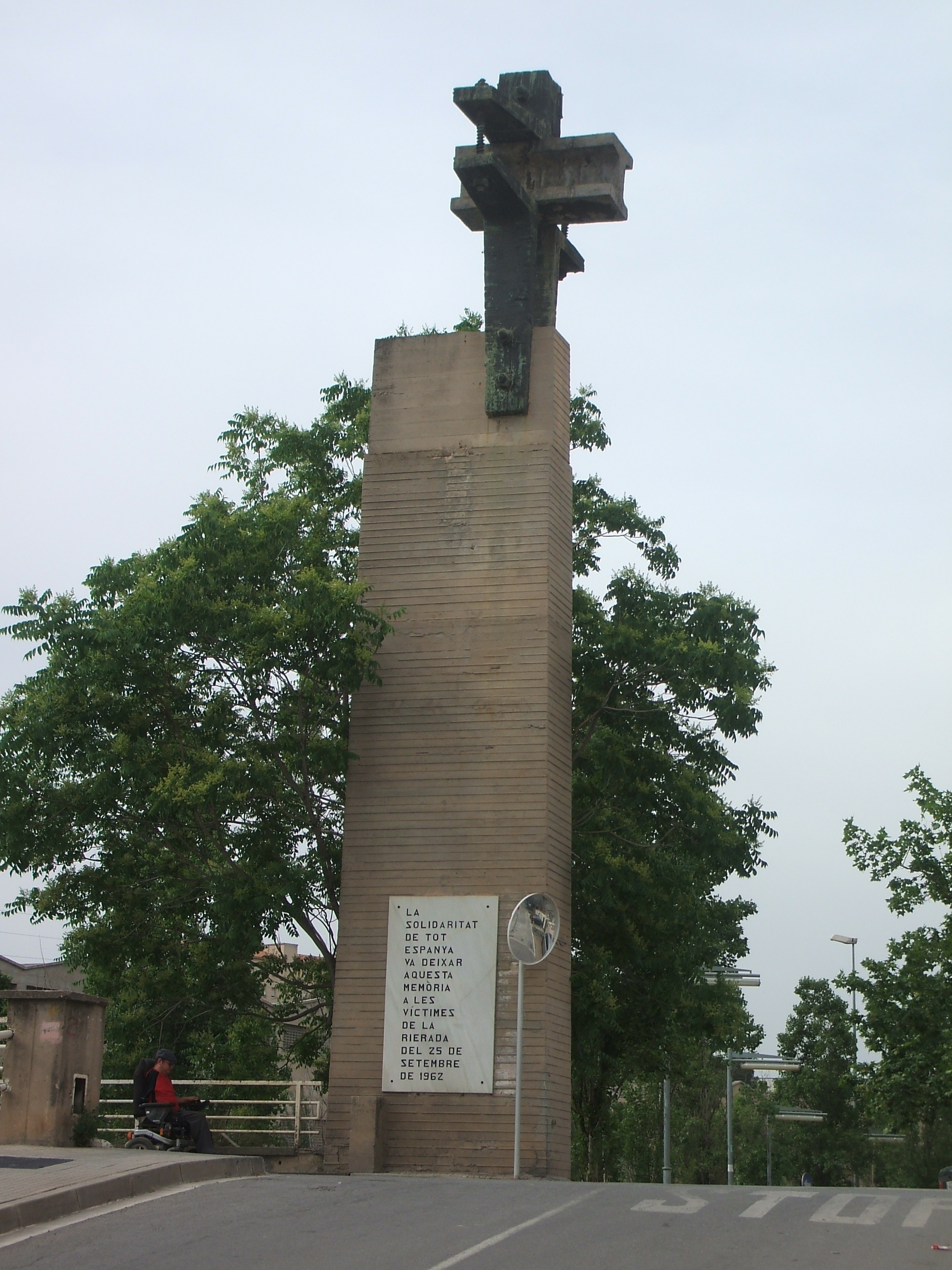
- Monument to the victims of the flood in Rubí
- Date: 25 September 1962
- Location: Vallès Occidental: Terrassa, Sabadell, Rubí, Sant Quirze del Vallès, Cerdanyola del Vallès, Ripollet Vallès Oriental: Mollet del Vallès Barcelonès: Sant Adrià de Besòs
- Deaths: 617 official death toll 800 - 1000 estimated

The 1962 Vallès floods took place on 25 September 1962, mainly in the comarca of Vallès Occidental and to a less extent in Vallès Oriental and Barcelonès. The flood was caused by a cold drop (gota freda) with heavy rain, overflowing the Llobregat and Besòs rivers. The official death toll was 617, but estimates imply between 800 and 1000 deaths.

== Causes ==
=== Meteorologic ===
Location of Vallès Occidental in Catalonia.

After a long period of drought, on 25 September 1962, a precipitation of 212 liters per square meter (212 mm rain) occurred during a time period of less than three hours. This increased rapidly the flow of the final parts of Llobregat and Besòs rivers and of their tributaries. The rain affected mainly the comarca of Vallès Occidental, but they were also heavy in Vallès Oriental, Baix Llobregat and Maresme.

=== Geographic ===
The bed of the Arenes stream remains dry for much of the year, with a fall of about 60 l/m2 being necessary for water to circulate. The hot air chimney that rose in a cold air mass, triggered peak flows greater than 1000 l/m2.

=== Geologic ===
The geological characteristics of the area, with sedimentary and clayey terrain, meant that the bed of the stream was full of clay, pebbles and gravel. Also, a large number of trees and stones that were near the river helped to increase the catastrophe. Nowadays, the bed has become populated again, raising the concern of the neighbors.

=== Urban planning ===
The economic development of Vallès in the 1940s and 1950s led to a population increase, which meant the construction of buildings close to the rivers, both homes and industries, with a marked lack of urban control. These marginal neighborhoods, built with low quality housing, were the most affected.

== Impact ==
The flood that affected the populations of Terrassa, Rubí, Sabadell, Sant Quirze, Cerdanyola del Vallès, Ripollet, Mollet del Vallès and Sant Adrià de Besòs caused between 617 and 1000 deaths, thousands of injured and economic damage of 2650 million pesetas being the largest natural catastrophe in the history of Spain.

=== Terrassa ===
The area of Terrassa is crossed by numerous torrents and two streams, usually dry, the function of which is to transport water from the Sant Llorenç del Munt and Serra de l'Obac massif into the Llobregat river and through this stream to the Mediterranean Sea. The Palau stream, which originates in the north of the town, passed through the Ègara rambla through a collector that joined the Arenas stream. This stream crossed the city without channeling and formed, at Les Fonts, the Rubí stream. People knew about the damage that occurred when the rivers receded, but the problem was that construction was allowed in their surroundings, making the catastrophe exponentially worse. On the Rambla d'Ègara - then Caudillo Avenue - the installer was blocked by the materials dragged by the Palau stream. The Renfe bridge that served as a dam collapsed and the water reached more than two meters high, taking away everything in its path. On the Rambla d'Ègara alone, 72 people lost their lives and 17 were reported missing. The flood devastated the factories located in the upper part, demolished several houses and dragged cars to the Rambleta. On the other hand, the Arenes stream diverted its course in the blocks of the Sant Llorenç groups and flowed through an old channel, devastating the current Ègara neighborhood on the right bank, the triangle of death where it caused more than a hundred victims and demolished a large part of the houses. The total number of victims (and missing) is 372.

=== Rubí ===
In the area of Rubí, more than 250 deaths were caused by the flood. The Escardívol neighborhood was entirely destroyed.

=== Sabadell ===
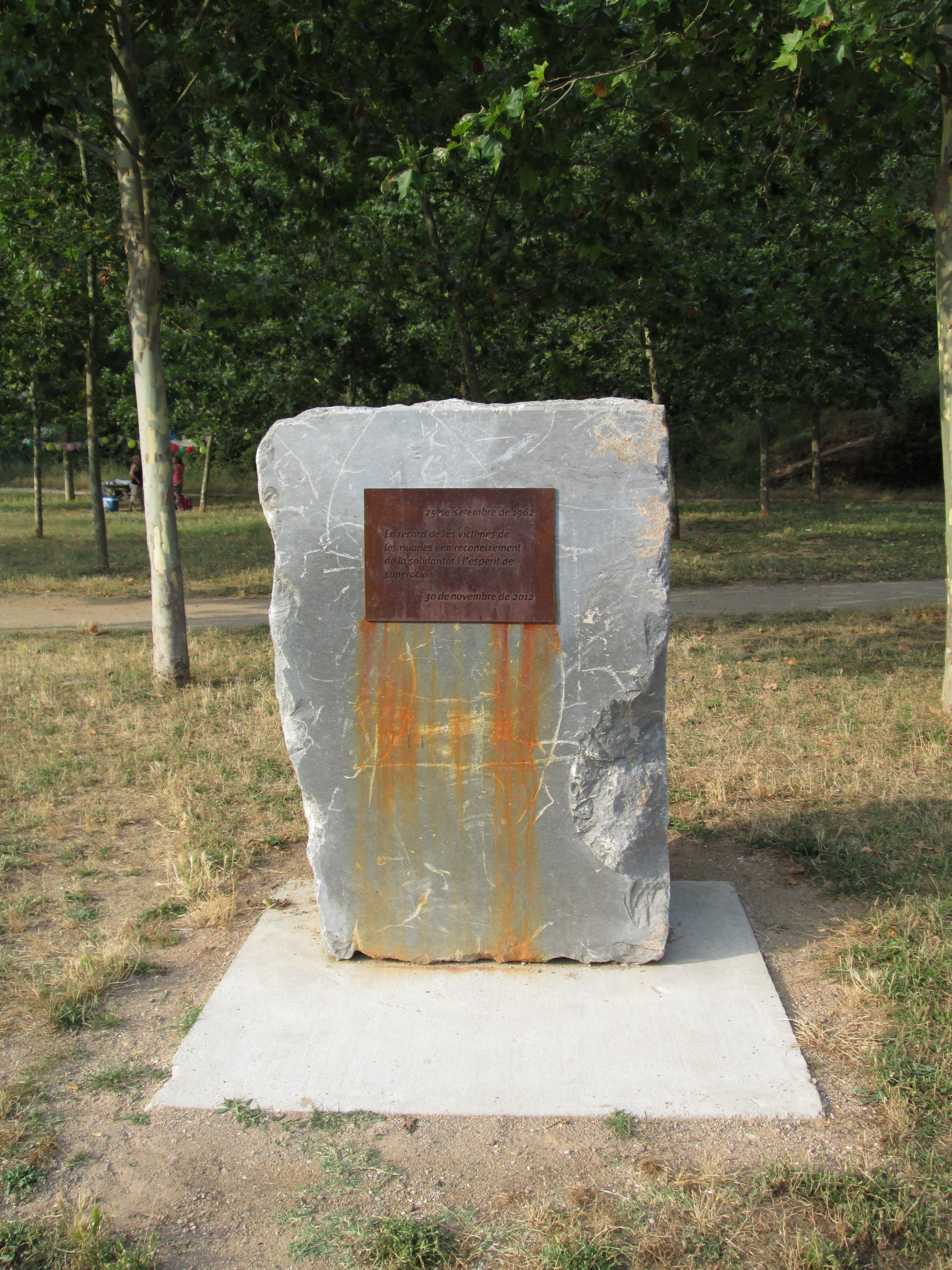
Monument in memory of the victims in Sabadell

In Sabadell, the waters of the local streams and the Ripoll river rose until they reached the homes and industries located within or on the side of the river course. The flood took away the houses it found in its path. The Torre-romeu neighborhood, located in the northeast of the city, on the other side of the Ripoll and built largely on the river bed, was one of the most affected neighborhoods in Sabadell. Can Puigener was another of the neighborhoods that suffered the most from the flood. Also in the neighborhoods of Plana del Pintor or Campoamor the rain affected many houses. The industries located in the course of the river were also heavily damaged.

The next day, 26 September, it was estimated that the flood had affected 80% of Sabadell's sizing and industrial leftovers industries, representing 40% of Spain's capacity. All factories were affected. Tintoreria Castelló had inaugurated the building a few days ago and the machinery, which was new, was completely destroyed. Acabats Estruch, S.A., Tints i Aprestos Casanoves Argelaguet, S.A., Ramon Buxó i fills, Indústries Casablanques, S.A., Llorens i Torra, S.A., Grau, S.A., Sabadell Tèxtil, S.A., among others were some of the industries affected in Sabadell.

The floods in Cerdanyola del Vallès were not as severe since the Sec river and the Major river, the two rivers that flow through the town, did not receive the same amount as the Riera de les Arenes or the Ripoll river, thus, despite the numerous material losses, no fatalities were recorded. The families that lost their homes, basically in the Montflorit neighborhood, were relocated through the help they received from the City Council.

=== Ripollet ===
In the locality of Ripollet, there were 12 victims and some factories and 36 homes were destroyed. Ripollet, suffered two more floods on November 4 and 7 of the same year, before having recovered from the first flood.

=== Mollet del Vallès ===
In the municipality of Mollet del Vallès the storm, lasted between an hour and a half and three hours, reaching at some point maximum intensity of six liters per square meter per minute. Despite causing a lot of material and personal damage, it did not cause fatalities.

=== Sant Quirze del Vallès ===
The population of Sant Quirze del Vallès, then San Quirico de Tarrasa, was affected by the overflowing of the Sec river, that when flowing through Los Rosales neighborhood caused several victims and material damage.

=== Montcada i Reixac ===
The locality of Montcada i Reixac lost 30 people and had damages of approximately 200 million pesetas. After the floods, the population carried out an economic and urban reconstruction of the city.

== Reaction ==
=== Immediate measures ===
The entire Vallès area was declared in a state of emergency, with the consequent help of all types of public and private organizations such as the Red Cross, the Spanish army, administrations, associations, unions and the voluntary civilian population through material support or with the opening of accounts for aid to the affected Catalan population.

=== 50th anniversary ===
On the occasion of the 50th anniversary, on 25 September 2012, various events were organized and material was recreated to remember this event, also seeking popular participation through a website to collect all possible information and testimonies.

== See also ==
- 1938 Yellow River flood
- North Sea flood of 1953
- 1957 Valencia flood
- 1959 Uruguayan flood
- 2007 Tabasco-Chiapas flood
- List of floods
