= List of cold drop events =

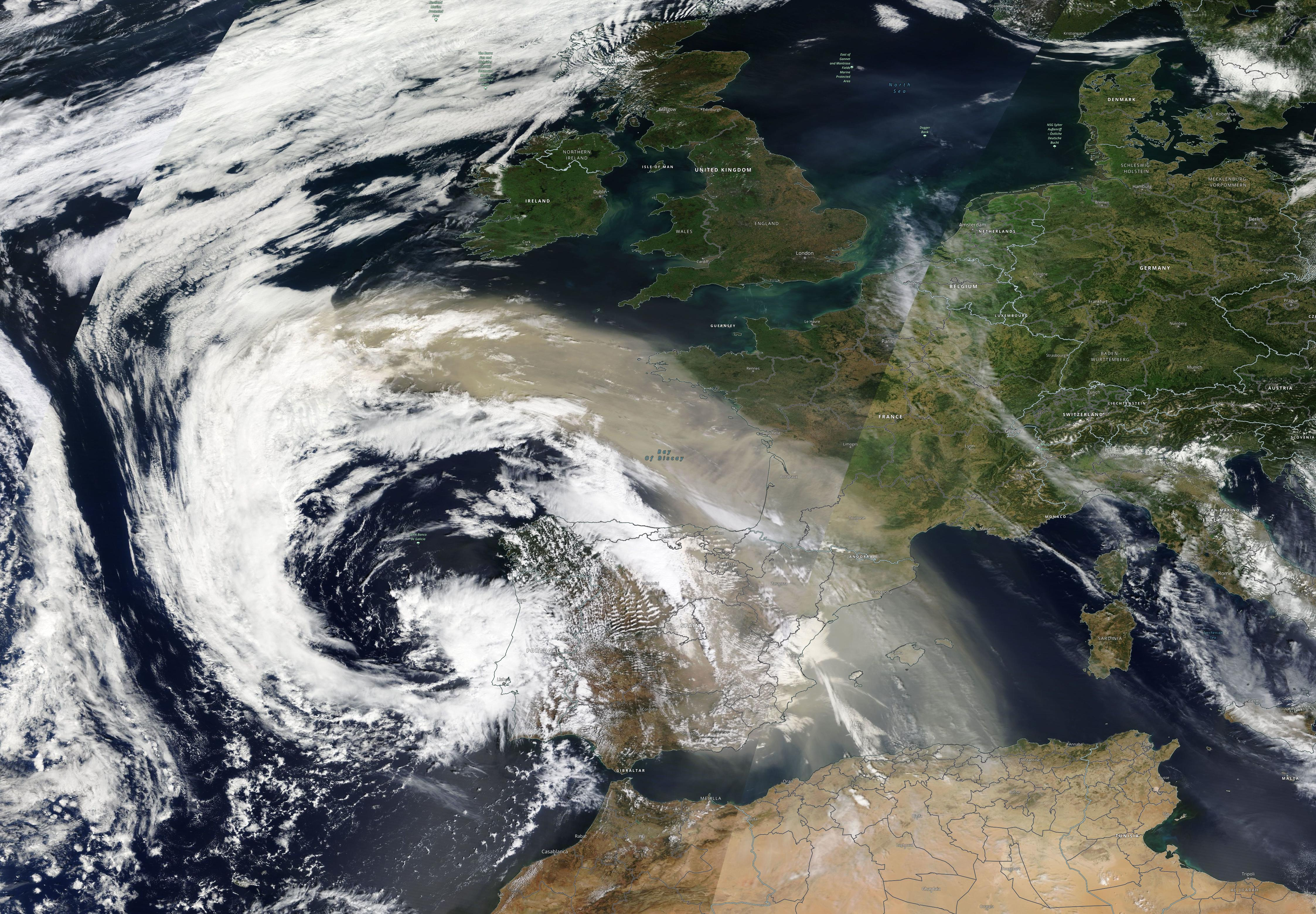
NASA Worldview imaging of a cold drop over the west of the Iberian Peninsula in September 2023

This list of cold drop events chronologically compiles the heavy rainfall events caused by cold drops (Spanish: Gota Fría) that have resulted in serious flooding.

In Spain, cold drops often cause intense rainfall and are created by the interaction of upper-level low pressure systems strangled and ultimately detached from the zonal (eastward) circulation displaying stationary or retrograde (westward) circulation with humid and warmer air masses provided by an overheated Mediterranean in the Autumn.

Spanish meteorologists also call this phenomenon Depresión Aislada en Niveles Altos or DANA (English: “Isolated Depression at High Levels”).

== List ==
Chronology of severe weather events caused by cold drops
Date	Regions impacted	Event	Effects
August 13, 1356	Valencia	Intense flooding of the Rio Turia, after which a "Council for Walls and Ramparts" was established.	400–500 deaths
September 27, 1517	Valencia	Heavy rains caused the Rio Turia to overflow its banks and destroy numerous bridges, mills and other buildings near the riverbed.	Dozens of people and numerous animals died.
June 10, 1796	Province of Burgos	A devastating weather event that severely affected grain production.	
October 15, 1879	Province of Murcia, especially the city of Orihuela	Santa Teresa flood: The heavy rains caused the Segura to overflow, acquiring destructive power as it passed through inhabited areas.	More than a thousand deaths and significant material losses.
September 11, 1891	Southeast Spain, especially the towns of Adra, Gádor, and Benahadux	Sudden flooding of the Almería Rambla and other canals in the region. Local authorities had neither effective warning systems nor adequate infrastructure to manage an event of this magnitude.	Several streets and buildings were destroyed or severely damaged, and more than a hundred people died.
End of September 1949	Valencia	Severe flooding of the Rio Turia; hundreds of houses located in the old Turia canal were razed to the ground.	High number of victims.
October 14, 1957	Valencia	1957 Valencia flood: A severe cold snap caused the Turia to burst its banks. In less than 24 hours, the city was completely flooded, and in the districts closest to the river, the water level reached five meters. The flooding showed the city's vulnerability to extreme events. As a countermeasure, the Turia River was to be diverted to the south of the city.	Death of at least 81 people and destruction of houses and infrastructure.
September 25, 1962	Barcelona	Floods occurred in the catchment areas of the Llobregat and Besós rivers. Flooding also occurred throughout the Balearic Islands (Palma de Mallorca and Andratx).	Between 600 and 1,000 fatalities.
October 20, 1982	La Ribera	As a result of heavy rainfall, the Tous Reservoir collapsed, and the Júcar River flooded the entire La Ribera region, causing great damage, and entire towns were flooded up to the first floor.	Eight people died.
August 26, 1983	Bilbao	Due to the rains, water in some parts of Bilbao rose to a height of 5 metres.	34 deaths and 5 missing.
November 3, 1987	Gandía and Oliva	In Gandía and Oliva, rainfall exceeded 500 L/m^{2}, devastating the Safor region. In Oliva, the Spanish record for 24-hour rainfall was reached at 817 L/m^{2}.	
September 6, 1989	Balearic regions around Manacor and Felanitx	188 L/m^{2} in Manacor and 192 L/m^{2} in Porto Cristo, Mallorca. Artificial waterways overflowed their banks within a few hours, flooding fields and bays as well as part of the town centre of Manacor.	3 fatalities.
September 30, 1997	Alicante and the south of the Province of Valencia	Alicante experienced its worst storm since weather records began, with 270 L/m^{2} of rain falling within 6 hours, causing flooding.	5 deaths, severe damage to houses and buildings in the city.
October 2000	Province of Castellón and north of Valencia	A long period of cold weather caused rainfall of more than 600 L/m^{2} to accumulate in three days, which flooded rivers such as the Palancia, Sonella, and Mijares, causing serious damage. Floods in Onda, Nules, Castellón, and Vall de Uxó were close to destroying the María Cristina and Benitandús reservoirs.	
March 31, 2002	Tenerife	A cold drop caused torrential rain in the Santa Cruz de Tenerife area that amounted to 232.6 L/m^{2} in 24 hours and 129.9 L/m^{2} in 1 hour.	7 deaths and property damage worth 90 million euros.
October 12–13, 2007	Marina Alta	The cold snap exceeded 450 L/m^{2} of rainfall in about 15 hours in the towns of Parcent, L'Atzúbia, Murla and La Vall de Boí, causing the largest recorded flood of river banks in Girona, the destruction of the Beniarbeig bridge, and the flooding of a large part of this town.	1 death
September 28, 2012	Vera and Cuevas del Almanzora	Heavy rain lasting several hours caused fatalities and considerable property damage.	4 deaths
September 30, 2012	Province of Murcia	In the Guadalentín Valley, especially on the Rambla Nogalte, torrential rains destroyed roads and hundreds of affected houses, and caused the collapse of the motorway bridge in Puerto Lumbreras.	7 fatalities, thousands of animals perished.
October 19–21, 2018	Province of Málaga	Rainfall amounts of 463 L/m^{2} were recorded in Campillos and 452 L/m^{2} in Ardales. Alpandeire also recorded high rainfall. More than forty municipalities suffered damage to infrastructure, livestock and crops.	One firefighter died during the rescue efforts.
September 2019	Province of Murcia, Albacete, and Almería	300 L/m^{2} or more of rainfall caused the Río Clariano in Ontinyent and the Segura River, as well as the Almansa reservoir, to overflow. Orihuela was the worst affected, with more than 500 L/m^{2} of rainfall, flooding numerous urban centres and more than 5,000 hectares of orchards.	7 deaths, damages estimated at 170 to 190 million euros.
January 2020	Entire Spanish Mediterranean coast, mainly the Balearic Islands, Catalonia, and the Valencian Community.	Storm Gloria: Severe damage caused by waves up to 7 metres high near the coast.	14 fatalities
September 2 and 4, 2023	Much of the Iberian Peninsula, particularly the provinces of Toledo and Madrid, as well as area in the provinces of Tarragona, Segovia, and Cádiz.	Heavy rainfall resulted in up to 215 L/m^{2} falling within 24 hours, flooding numerous houses and requiring the closure of roads and railway lines.	6 deaths
October 29 to November 8, 2024	Málaga, Albacete, Cuenca and especially Valencia.	2024 Spanish floods: Widespread flooding caused severe damage, particularly in the regions of Valencia, Andalusia and Murcia. Huge amounts of rain fell in a short space of time, reaching up to 491 L/m^{2} in 8 hours, causing flash floods and mudslides that trapped many people in their homes or cars.	At least 237 deaths, one of the deadliest flood disasters in Spain's modern history.

Note: 1 L/m^{2} = 1 mm precipitation height

== See also ==
- List of floods
- List of flash floods
