= José María Ángel Batalla =

Spanish politician

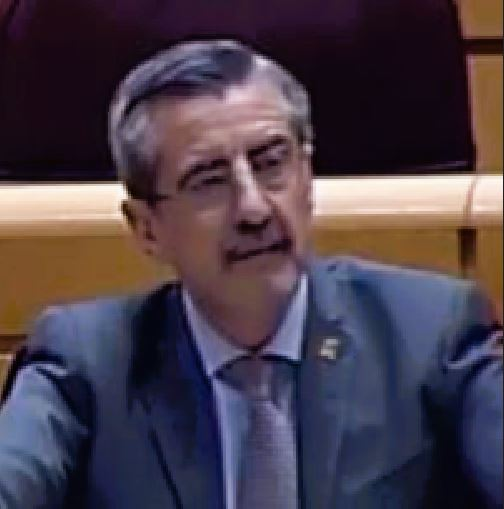

Member of the Congress of Deputies
- In office 2011–2015
- Appointed by: Corts Valencianes

Mayor of La Eliana
- In office 1997–2015

Personal details
- Born: 6 December 1956 (age 69) Valencia, Spain
- Party: PSPV-PSOE
- Occupation: Politician

José María Ángel Batalla (born December 6, 1956, in Valencia) is a Spanish politician. He has been mayor of La Eliana, a municipality in the province of Valencia, and was a senator appointed by the Valencian Parliament representing the community from 2011 to 2015.

== Early life ==
José María Ángel Batalla was born in Valencia in 1956 and has been a resident of La Eliana since 1985. He attended primary school at the Colegio Pío XII and secondary school at the Instituto Benlliure in Valencia. In 1975 he began studies in geography and history at the University of Valencia, where he was present for one year, and there is no record of him having completed them at any university.

== Political career ==
He completed a course in public management at ESADE, Barcelona in 1990. He is a civil servant at the Provincial Council of Valencia and head of service since 1992. Between 1993 and 1995, he was an advisor at the Ministry of the Interior.

In 1991, he joined the governing team of the La Eliana City Council as Councilor for Sports and later as Councilor for Citizen Security. From 1997 to 2015, he served as Mayor of La Eliana.

José María Ángel has been a member of the National Committee of the Socialists since 1996 and was Secretary General of the PSPV-PSOE in Campo del Turia from 2000 to 2007, as well as Secretary of Municipal Policy of the PSPV-PSOE until 2012.

In 2015, he was appointed regional secretary of Security and Emergencies and general director of the Valencian Agency for Security and Emergency Response, a position he held until his resignation in September 2023.

Later, in December 2024, he was appointed special commissioner for the reconstruction and repair of the damage caused by Cyclone Dana in different municipalities between October 28 and November 4, 2024. On July 31, 2025, he resigned from this position in the context of the scandal of a false university degree in his personal file at the Valencia Provincial Council.

In June 2024, the La Eliana city council, also from the PSOE, named the new House of Culture after Josep María Ángel, with the minister Diana Morant at the opening ceremony.

=== Falsehood in qualifications ===
On July 29, 2025, a report by the Valencian Anti-Fraud Agency was made public, proving that the Diploma in Archival Science and Library Science from the University of Valencia that appears in his personal file, necessary to access a civil servant position in subgroup A2 (at that time group B) in the Valencia Provincial Council, is false, among other evidence, because said degree was not implemented until 1990. That same day, the Anti-Corruption Prosecutor's Office opens an investigation into the possible falsification of the university degree. On July 31, 2025, he submits a letter to the Ministry of Territorial Policy resigning from his position as Commissioner for the DANA. The day before, it is announced that the Valencia Provincial Council has opened a file on his wife, Carmen Ninet, for alleged irregularities in her qualifications for a management position.

On August 8, 2025, it was made public that he was hospitalized in Llíria Hospital for attempted suicide.
