= Cold drop =

Meteorological phenomenon blocking atmospheric circulation

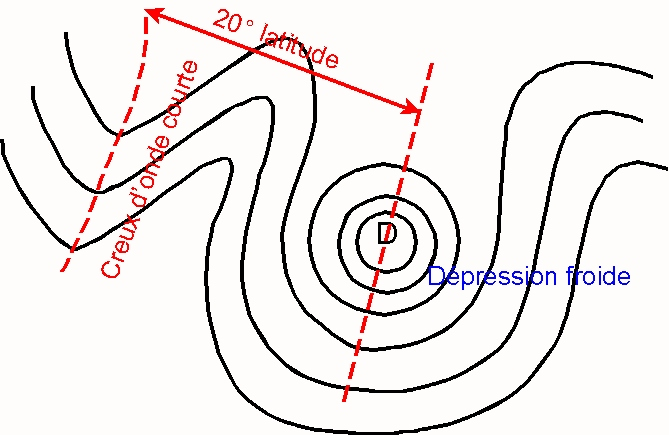
A stationary cold low, in which a cold drop is found.

A cold drop (Note: Basque: tanta hotz; Catalan: gota freda; French: goutte froide; Galician and Spanish: gota fría) is a term used in Spain and France that has commonly come to refer to any high impact rainfall event occurring in the autumn along the Spanish Mediterranean coast or across France. In Europe, cold drops belong to the characteristics of the Mediterranean climate.

The Spanish-language name of gota fría was directly adapted from the term Kaltlufttropfen introduced by German meteorologists, and became very popular in 1980s Spain as a blanket term to refer to any high-impact rainfall event.

In the eastern regions of the Iberian Peninsula, these events are typically caused by the interaction of upper-level low pressure systems strangled and ultimately detached from the zonal (eastward) circulation displaying stationary or retrograde (westward) circulation with humid warmer air masses that form over an overheated Mediterranean Sea in the Autumn. The Spanish equivalent of cut-off low is known as an "isolated depression at high levels" (depresión aislada en niveles altos) and is often abbreviated to the acronym DANA. Such recurring synoptic configurations are not necessarily associated to cold drop events. (Note: In the Summer, a stationary DANA located off the Western coast of the Iberia Peninsula may favor torrid temperatures as it induces south-north meridional flows (to its East).)

== Occurrence ==
=== Spain ===
If a sudden cut off in the jet stream takes place (particularly on the Atlantic Ocean), a pocket of cold air detaches from the main jet stream, moving southward over the Pyrenees into the warm air over Spain, causing its most dramatic effects in the southeast of Spain, particularly along the Spanish Mediterranean coast, especially in the Valencian Community. The torrential rain from a cold drop can result in devastation from torrents and flash floods.

This phenomenon is associated with extremely violent downpours and storms, but not always accompanied by significant rainfall. For this, high atmospheric instability in the lower layers of the atmosphere needs to be combined with a significant amount of moisture.

==== Disasters ====
The great Valencia flood on 14 October 1957 was the result of a three-day-long cold drop and caused the deaths of at least 81 people.

The Vallès floods on 25 September 1962 in the province of Barcelona were caused by a cold drop (gota fría), producing heavy rain, overflowing the Llobregat and Besòs rivers. The official death toll was 617.

A DANA event on 29 October 2024 caused considerable loss of life and extensive damage, especially in the Valencian Community and the provinces of Albacete, Almería, and Málaga.

== See also ==
- List of cold drop events
- Cold-core low
- Cold pool
- Polar vortex
