= Climate leave =

Climate leave is paid time off from work that workers may use to address needs at one's home resulting from adverse weather impacts without losing pay. The policy was first adopted in Spain by the government of Pedro Sánchez in November 2024 in response to the impact of the 2024 Spanish floods.

In the United States, "weather and safety leave" is authorized under section 6329c of Title 5 of the United States Code for federal employees in response to closures of federal offices or prevention of travel to work at a federal office, but not in response to weather and safety impacts on the employee's home.
