= Insurance Compensation Consortium =

The Insurance Compensation Consortium (Spanish: Consorcio de Compensación de Seguros, CCS) is a compulsory Government catastrophic risk insurance in Spain. It is an insurance tax charged on prescribed classes of insurance issued by private insurers, providing cover against a series of extraordinary perils and "political risks”.

Note: This Government scheme covers direct physical damage only. It is expected that a company ensures their commercial insurance policy covers them against any resulting Business Interruption losses if necessary.

== Sources ==
http://www.isn-inc.com/countryinfo/spain.aspx

There are regulations concerning payment of the Consorcio tax within a certain time of the inception date of the policy. The timelines are very strict – payment of the tax should be made to the Consorcio office within 7 days (of inception of the policy) for a new risk, and within 30 days for a renewal.
