= Binaced =

Coordinates: 41°49′N 0°12′E

- municipality
- Flag Coat of arms
- Interactive map of Binaced
- Country: Spain
- Autonomous community: Aragon
- Province: Huesca

Area
  - Total: 78 km^{2} (30 sq mi)

Population (2025-01-01)
  - Total: 1,694
  - Density: 22/km^{2} (56/sq mi)
- Time zone: UTC+1 (CET)
  - Summer (DST): UTC+2 (CEST)

Binaced (Aragonese: Binazet) is a municipality located in the province of Huesca, Aragon, Spain. According to the 2004 census (INE), the municipality has a population of 1,645 inhabitants.

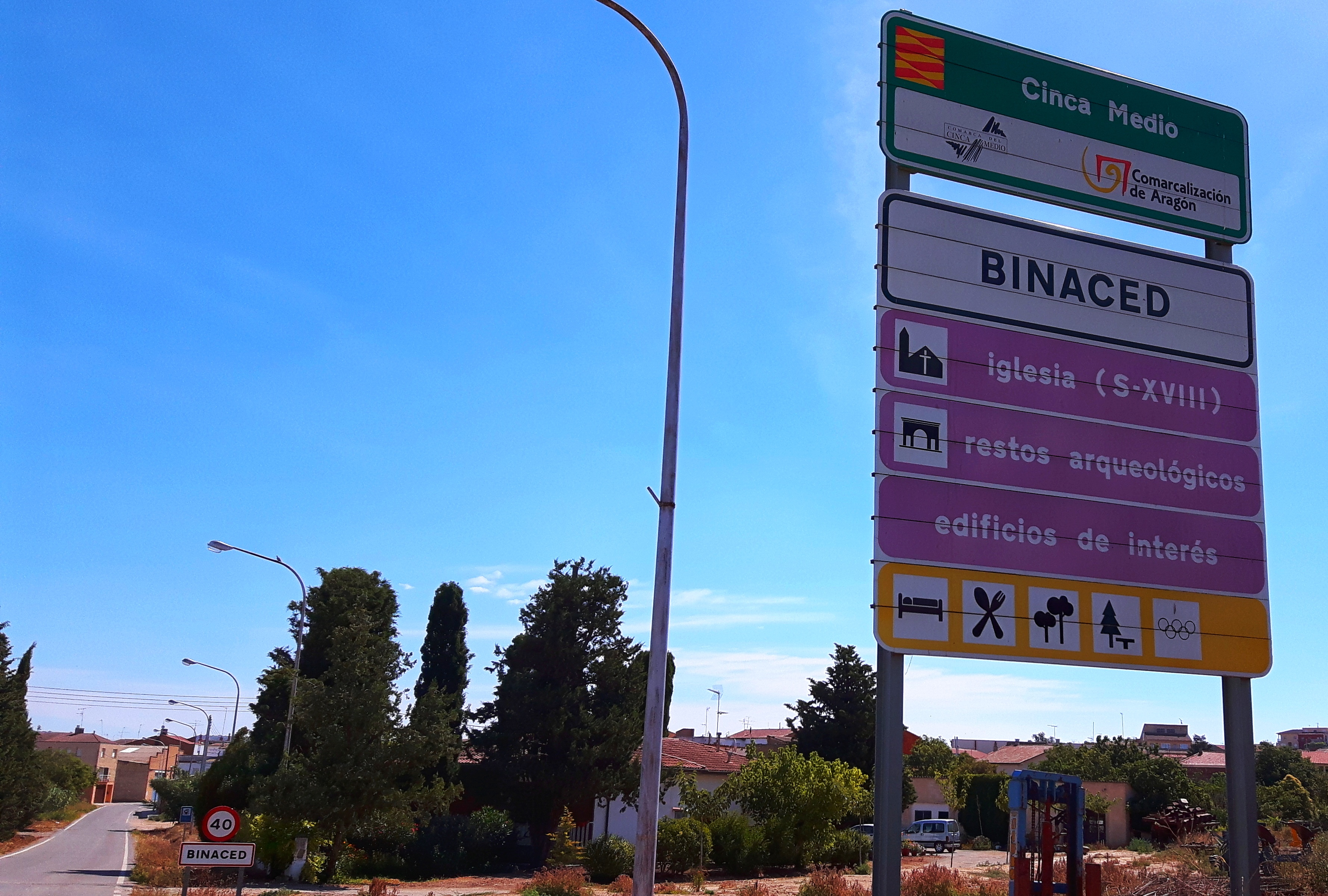
Entrance to Binaced, Huesca

== See also ==
- List of municipalities in Huesca
