= 1957 Valencia flood =

Fatal natural disaster in Spain

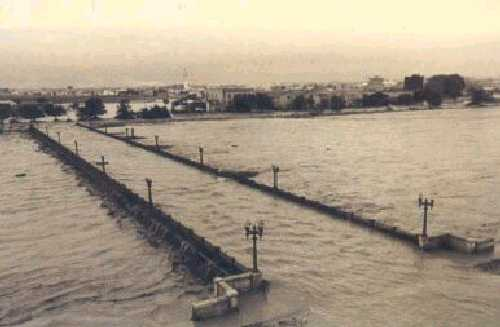
- Flooding of the Turia river
- Date: 14 October 1957
- Location: Valencia, Province of Valencia
- Deaths: at least 81 deaths
- Property damage: 10–16 billion pesetas

A flood on 14 October 1957 in Valencia, Spain, resulted in significant damage to property and caused the deaths of at least 81 people. In response to the tragedy, the Spanish government devised and enacted the Plan Sur, which rerouted the city's main river, the Turia.

== Background ==
A large number of floods have been recorded in Valencia, from 1321 to 1897. Up to 75 floods are estimated to have taken place in the seven centuries prior to the 1957 flood.

== The disaster ==
During a 3-day cold drop, heavy rain had fallen in the city and upstream along the Túria river on Saturday 12 October, easing up overnight. The rain resumed the next morning around 07:00. The towns of Chelva, Casinos and Ademuz were particularly affected, suffering light flooding. The rain continued until 14 October. In Valencia, there was torrential rainfall around midday on the 14th. The Turia overflowed, discharging up to 300,000,000 cubic metres (390,000,000 cu yd) of water into the city. While some of the older streets in Valencia's historic centre, such as Calle del Micalet, Plaza de la Reina and Plaza del Michalet, largely escaped damage, the newer bridges and areas to the north of the river, such as Zaidia and Campanar, suffered severe damage. In the Marxalanes district, some streets were under 5 metres (16 ft) of water. The Natzaret district near Valencia port was cut off from the rest of the city. The city as a whole was left without water, gas and electricity and around 75% of commercial and industrial activity was affected. Around 5,800 homes were destroyed, leaving approximately 3,500 families homeless. The final death toll was at least 81 people.

== Response ==
The local governments of Murcia, Madrid, Barcelona and surrounding areas immediately offered help, although external rescue efforts were hindered by the flooding of the main roads to the city. The Spanish army was deployed alongside the emergency services to help in the cleanup operation.

The flood occurred as the government was having meetings in Barcelona. The minister responsible, Luis Carrero Blanco, interrupted those meetings to put Vicente Mortes Alfonso in charge of finding temporary housing for those left homeless by the disaster. On 24 October 1957, Spanish dictator Francisco Franco visited Valencia and promised government funding for reconstruction of the city and adequate supplies to those affected.

In reaction to the disaster, the Cortes Españolas unanimously approved the Plan Sur on 21 December 1961. This rerouted the Turia to the south of Valencia, three kilometres from its original course. The new course is 12 kilometres (7.5 mi) long and 175 metres (574 ft) wide. Despite objections from Quart de Poblet and Mislata, municipalities to the west of Valencia affected by the plan, work began in 1964 and finished in 1973.

== See also ==
- Storm Gloria, caused severe flooding in the Valencia area in January 2020
- October 2024 Spain floods, of which the worst effects were in the Province of Valencia
- List of cold drop events
