= Sant Quirze del Vallès =

- Municipality
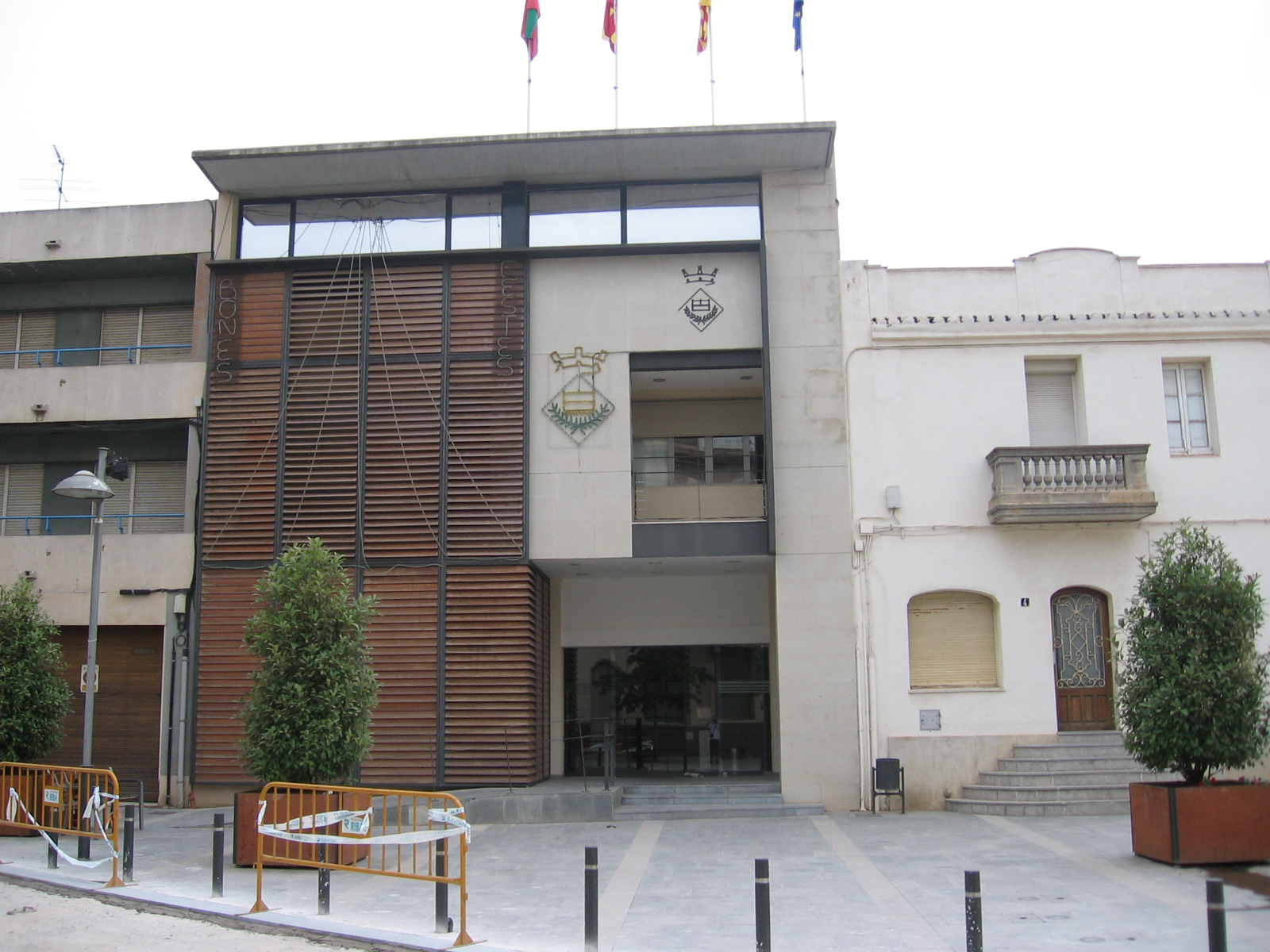
- Town hall

- Coat of arms

- Location in Catalonia Sant Quirze del Vallès (Spain)
- Coordinates: 41°32′5″N 2°4′56″E
- Country: Spain
- Community: Catalonia
- Province: Barcelona
- Comarca: Vallès Occidental

Government
  - Mayor: Elisabeth Oliveras Jorba (2015)

Area
  - Total: 14.1 km^{2} (5.4 sq mi)

Population (2014)
  - Total: 19,549
  - Density: 1,390/km^{2} (3,590/sq mi)
- Website: santquirzevalles.cat

Sant Quirze del Vallès (Catalan pronunciation: [ˌsaŋ ˈkiɾzə ðəl βəˈʎɛs]) is a town located in the comarca of the Vallès Occidental, province of Barcelona, Catalonia.

It is located about 12 miles away from the capital city, Barcelona. Sant Quirze is a residential town populated by approximately 20,000 people with a density of 1.432,27 hab/km², and has grown since the end of the 1990s onwards. It shares borders with Sabadell, Rubí, Terrassa and Sant Cugat, among others, which are important towns within the Barcelona area, since they form Catalonia's most important industrial area and probably also Spain's.

Sant Quirze del Vallès is located near the mountain range of the Serra dels Galliners. It has direct access to C58 highway to Barcelona, among others like C58 Manresa and AP7 highway to Girona, Tarragona and Lleida.

== History ==
Sant Quirze was constituted as a municipality in 1848, as a segregation of Terrassa. Therefore, in the 13th century it was known as Sant Quirze de Terrassa (Sant Quirze of Terrassa) and in the 15th century it was denominated as Sant Quirze de Galliners, named after the mountain range called Galliners. In 1857, it was baptized with the name of San Quirico de Tarrasa, in a Spanish way, which was changed to Sant Quirze de la Serra and changed back again to the Spanish way after the war. In 1976 the name changed to Sant Quirze del Vallès, which was officiated in 1983 with the disagreement of some of the population.

== Services ==
Sant Quirze owns many educational centres: Onze de Setembre, El Turonet, Purificació Salas, Pilarín Bayés, Taula Rodona, Lola Anglada, Sant Quirze high school, Salas i Xandri high school, Music municipal school and the Adults centre school.
