= List of shipwrecks in 1816 =

The list of shipwrecks in 1816 includes ships sunk, wrecked or otherwise lost during 1816.

table of contents
1816
Jan	Feb	Mar	Apr
May	Jun	Jul	Aug
Sep	Oct	Nov	Dec
Unknown date

== January ==
=== 1 January ===
List of shipwrecks: 1 January 1816
Ship	State	Description
Indian Chief	United States	The ship was wrecked west of Cuba.
Jane	United Kingdom	The ship ran aground on the North Bank, in Liverpool Bay. She was on a voyage from Liverpool, Lancashire to an African port. She was refloated and resumed her voyage.
Swallow	United Kingdom	The brig was abandoned in the Swin. She was taken into the River Colne.

=== 4 January ===
List of shipwrecks: 4 January 1816
Ship	State	Description
Iris	United Kingdom	St. Mary (United Kingdom) discovered the galiot capsized and crewless in the English Channel off the Owers Sandbank.

=== 5 January ===
List of shipwrecks: 5 January 1816
Ship	State	Description
Eagle	United Kingdom	The ship was run into in the English Channel off the coast of Sussex and was severely damaged. She was on a voyage from London to an African port. She put in to Portsmouth, Hampshire.
Flora	United Kingdom	The ship was driven ashore at Whitby, Yorkshire. Her crew were rescued.

=== 7 January ===
List of shipwrecks: 7 January 1816
Ship	State	Description
Betsey	United Kingdom	The ship was wrecked in Bigbury Bay with the loss of at least 28 lives. There were at least 37 survivors.

=== 8 January ===
List of shipwrecks: 8 January 1816
Ship	State	Description
Ann	United States	The ship was driven ashore and wrecked near Brielle, South Holland, Netherlands. She was on a voyage from New York to Amsterdam, North Holland, Netherlands.
Mary & Alicia	United Kingdom	The ship was driven ashore on the Bramston Sands, Devon. Her crew were rescued. She was on a voyage from Cork to Bristol, Gloucestershire.

=== 9 January ===
List of shipwrecks: 9 January 1816
Ship	State	Description
Eliza	United States	The ship was wrecked on the Brenton Reef, Narragansett Bay. She was on a voyage from Havana, Cuba to New York.
Hirondelle	France	The ship was wrecked on the Île de Ré. She was on a voyage from Bordeaux, Gironde to Saint-Malo, Finistère
James	United Kingdom	The ship was driven ashore near Quillebeuf-sur-Seine, Eure, France. She was on a voyage from Liverpool, Lancashire to Rouen, Seine-Inférieure, France. James was refloated on 11 January and arrived at Rouen on 15 January.
Romulus	United States	The ship foundered off Cape Ann, Massachusetts. Her crew were rescued. She was on a voyage from St. Ubes, Portugal to Boston, Massachusetts.

=== 10 January ===
List of shipwrecks: 10 January 1816
Ship	State	Description
Joven Zuylo	Spain	The brig was wrecked at Blackgang Chine, Isle of Wight, United Kingdom with the loss of all hands. She was on a voyage from Gijón to Ostend, West Flanders, Netherlands.
Robert & Mary	United Kingdom	The ship struck the pier at Ramsgate, Kent and was severely damaged. She was on a voyage from Falmouth, Cornwall to Sheerness, Kent.
Speculation	United Kingdom	The ship was wrecked at Savannah, Georgia, United States with the loss of seven of the fourteen people on board.

=== 11 January ===
List of shipwrecks: 11 January 1816
Ship	State	Description
Betsey	United Kingdom	The transport ship was wrecked in Bigbury Bay with the loss of 28 lives. She was on a voyage from Plymouth, Devon to a French port.
Hope	United Kingdom	The ship was run down and sunk in the Irish Sea off Douglas, Isle of Man. Her seven crew were rescued. She was on a voyage from Liverpool, Lancashire to Waterford or Wexford.
Maria Elizabeth	Netherlands	The ship was driven ashore near Noordwijk, North Holland. She was on a voyage from London, United Kingdom to Amsterdam, North Holland.
Speculation	Netherlands	The ship was driven ashore in the Elbe. She was on a voyage from Cuxhaven to Hamburg.
Union	United Kingdom	The ship was wrecked near Ayr. Her crew were rescued. She was on a voyage from Belfast to Larne, County Antrim.

=== 12 January ===
List of shipwrecks: 12 January 1816
Ship	State	Description
Betsey	United Kingdom	The ship struck the Home Sand and sank. Her crew were rescued. She was on a voyage from South Shields, County Durham to London.
Eliza	United Kingdom	The ship was driven ashore at Duncannon, County Wexford. She was on a voyage from Newfoundland, British North America to Waterford. Eliza was later refloated.
Fame	United Kingdom	The ship was wrecked on the Arklow Banks, in the North Sea. She was on a voyage from New York, United States to Newry, County Antrim.
Father and Sons	(United States) Missouri Territory	The ship was wrecked at Havre de Grâce, Seine-Inférieure, France.
Twee Gebroeders	Netherlands	The ship was driven ashore and wrecked in the Gironde River. She was on a voyage from Amsterdam, North Holland to Bayonne, Gironde, France.
Union	United Kingdom	The ship was driven ashore near Ayr.
William & Francis	United Kingdom	The ship was lost off Wells-next-the-Sea, Norfolk. She was on a voyage from London to Gainsborough, Lincolnshire.

=== 13 January ===
List of shipwrecks: 13 January 1816
Ship	State	Description
Clara	United Kingdom	The ship departed from Mundesley, Norfolk for Newcastle upon Tyne, Northumberland. No further trace, presumed foundered in the North Sea with the loss of all hands.

=== 14 January ===
List of shipwrecks: 14 January 1816
Ship	State	Description
Lydia	United States	The ship was wrecked at the mouth of the Gironde River. Her crew were rescued. She was on a voyage from Philadelphia, Pennsylvania to Bordeaux, Gironde.

=== 15 January ===
List of shipwrecks: 15 January 1816
Ship	State	Description
Canton	United States	The ship ran aground on Staten Island, New York. She was on a voyage from New York to Cádiz, Spain. She was refloated and put back to New York.
Eliza Ann	United Kingdom	The ship struc the Memory Rock. She was on a voyage from British Honduras to London. She put in to Nassau, Bahamas.
Speculation	United Kingdom	The ship was driven ashore in the Elbe.
Queen Charlotte	United Kingdom	The ship was wrecked on the Skull Martin Rock, in the Irish Sea off Ballywalter, County Down. Her crew were rescued. She was on a voyage from Whitehaven, Cumberland to Dublin.
Zephyr	United Kingdom	The ship struck the Whitton Sand, in the Humber and sank. She was on a voyage from Great Yarmouth, Norfolk to Gainsborough, Lincolnshire.

=== 16 January ===
List of shipwrecks: 16 January 1816
Ship	State	Description
Mary Ann	United Kingdom	The ship was lost whilst on a voyage from Glasgow, Renfrewshire to Newry, County Antrim. Her crew survived.

=== 17 January ===
List of shipwrecks: 17 January 1816
Ship	State	Description
Ann	United Kingdom	The sloop was driven ashore and wrecked near Ravenglass, Cumberland with the loss of one life. She was on a voyage from Wexford to Liverpool, Lancashire.
Ant	United Kingdom	The ship was driven ashore and wrecked at Padstow, Cornwall with the loss of four lives. She was on a voyage from Padstow to Swansea, Glamorgan.
Cerberus	United Kingdom	The ship was wrecked on the Isle of Jura. She was on a voyage from New Brunswick, British North America to Liverpool.
Forsoket	Norway	The ship was driven ashore on Islay, Inner Hebrides, United Kingdom. She was on a voyage from Londonderry, United Kingdom to Christiansand.
Helen and Agnes	United Kingdom	The ship was wrecked at Torr's Point with the loss of three of her crew. She was on a voyage from Larne, County Antrim to Liverpool.
Johanna Jacoba	Netherlands	The ship was wrecked at Saint Barthélemy. She was on a voyage from Surinam to Amsterdam, North Holland.
Quebec Packet	United Kingdom	The ship was driven ashore at Lamlash, Isle of Arran. She was on a voyage from Greenock, Renfrewshire to Livorno, Grand Duchy of Tuscany. She was refloated on 2 February and put back to Greenock.
Russell	United Kingdom	The brig was driven ashore at Hempstead, New York. She was on a voyage from Liverpool to New York. Russel had been refloated and taken in to New York by 6 February.
Unnamed	United Kingdom	The sloop was wrecked on the coast of Kirkcudbrightshire with the loss of three of her four crew.

=== 18 January ===
List of shipwrecks: 18 January 1816
Ship	State	Description
Mary	United Kingdom	The ship was driven ashore at Wilmington, Delaware. She was on a voyage from Saint CroixDanish West Indies to Wilmington.

=== 19 January ===
List of shipwrecks: 19 January 1816
Ship	State	Description
Estramina	(United Kingdom of Great Britain and Ireland) New South Wales	The schooner was wrecked at the mouth of the Hunter River. She was on a voyage from Newcastle to Sydney.
Elizabeth and Mary	(United Kingdom of Great Britain and Ireland) New South Wales	The schooner was driven ashore at the mouth of the Hunter's River. She was on a voyage from Newcastle to Sydney.
Plough	United Kingdom	The ship was wrecked on the Haaks Sandbank, in the North Sea off Texel, North Holland, Netherlands. Her crew were rescued. She was on a voyage from Stockton-on-Tees, County Durham to Livorno, Grand Duchy of Tuscany.
Rialto	United Kingdom	The ship struck a rock off Mandal, Norway. She was on a voyage from Danzig to Aberdeen. She put in to "Lushaven", Norway.

=== 20 January ===
List of shipwrecks: 20 January 1816
Ship	State	Description
Alert	United Kingdom	The ship was driven ashore and wrecked at Wexford. She was on a voyage from St. Domingo to Liverpool, Lancashire, and/or Portsmouth, Hampshire.
Amiable	United States	The ship was driven ashore at Campbeltown, Argyllshire, United Kingdom. She was on a voyage from Philadelphia, Pennsylvania to Belfast, County Antrim, United Kingdom.
Hound	United Kingdom	The ship ran aground near Stade, Kingdom of Hanover. She was on a voyage from Hull, Yorkshire to Hamburg. She was later refloated and taken in to Hamburg.

=== 21 January ===
List of shipwrecks: 21 January 1816
Ship	State	Description
Lyra	United Kingdom	The ship was driven onto the Fairness Rock, Margate, Kent. She was on a voyage from Ostend, West Flanders, Netherlands to London. Lyra was refloated.
Sophia	France	The full-rigged ship was driven ashore and wrecked on Martinique.
William & Mary	United Kingdom	The ship struck rocks at Exmouth, Devon and was severely damaged. She was on a voyage from Sunderland, County Durham to Exmouth.
Unnamed	Flag unknown	The ship was driven ashore and wrecked on Martinique.
Two unnamed vessels	United States	The ships were driven ashore and wrecked on Martinique.
Two unnamed vessels	Flags unknown	The sloops were driven ashore and wrecked on Martinique.

=== 22 January ===
List of shipwrecks: 22 January 1816
Ship	State	Description
Virgin del Rosario	Spain	The ship was wrecked on a reef off Point Salines, Granada. She was on a voyage from Cádiz to A Coruña.

=== 23 January ===
List of shipwrecks: 23 January 1816
Ship	State	Description
Balsamao	Portugal	The ship was destroyed by fire at Pernambuco, Brazil.
Nancy	United States	The ship was wrecked near Newburn, North Carolina. Her crew were rescued. She was on a voyage from St. Thomas, Virgin Islands to a port in North Carolina.
Sea Horse	United Kingdom	The transport ship was driven ashore near Sandwich, Kent. She was refloated and taken in to Ramsgte, Kent.

=== 26 January ===
List of shipwrecks: 26 January 1816
Ship	State	Description
Dispatch	United Kingdom	The ship was driven ashore at Maranhão, United Kingdom of Portugal, Brazil and the Algarves. She was on a voyage from Liverpool, Lancashire to Maranhão.

=== 27 January ===
List of shipwrecks: 27 January 1816
Ship	State	Description
Duchess of Wellington	United Kingdom	The ship was destroyed by fire at Saugur, India with the loss of at least five lives. She was on a voyage from Bengal, India to Batavia, Netherlands East Indies.

=== 28 January ===
List of shipwrecks: 28 January 1816
Ship	State	Description
Columbus	Russia	The ship was driven ashore on Texel, North Holland, Netherlands. She was on a voyage from Riga to Amsterdam, North Holland. Columbus was refloated on 30 January.
Martha	United States	The ship was driven ashore at Sandy Hook, New Jersey. She was on a voyage from New York to Demerara. Martha was refloated on 3 February and put back to New York.
Vittoria	France	The ship struck a rock off Quimper, Finistère and foundered with the loss of seven of her crew. She was on a voyage from Marseille, Bouches-du-Rhône to Poole, Dorset, United Kingdom of Great Britain and Ireland.

=== 29 January ===
List of shipwrecks: 29 January 1816
Ship	State	Description
Euphemia	(United Kingdom of Great Britain and Ireland) Jamaica	The ship foundered off San Bernando. She was on a voyage from Carthagena to "Lispata".

=== 30 January ===
List of shipwrecks: 30 January 1816
Ship	State	Description
Boadicea	United Kingdom	Wrecking of the Sea Horse, Boadicea and Lord Melville: The transport ship, a brig, was wrecked in Tramore Bay with the loss of 196 lives. At least 84 people survived. She was on a voyage from Ramsgate, Kent to Cork.
Esperance	France	The ship foundered in the Bay of Biscay off the mouth of the Loire. She was on a voyage from Bordeaux, Gironde to Rouen, Seine-Inférieure.
Lord Melville	United Kingdom	Wrecking of the Sea Horse, Boadicea and Lord Melville: The transport ship was wrecked in Tramore Bay with the loss of 12 lives. She was on a voyage from Ramsgate to Cork.
Molly	United Kingdom	The ship was driven ashore and wrecked on São Miguel Island, Azores.
Rover	United Kingdom	The ship was lost near Devil's Point, Devon. Her crew were rescued. She was on a voyage from Southampton, Hampshire to Plymouth, Devon.
Sea Horse	United Kingdom	Wrecking of the Sea Horse, Boadicea and Lord Melville: The transport ship was wrecked in Tramore Bay with the loss of 376 of the 402 people on board. She was on a voyage from Ramsgate to Cork.

=== 31 January ===
List of shipwrecks: 31 January 1816
Ship	State	Description
Appolonia	United Kingdom	The brig was wrecked in Tramore Bay. Her crew were rescued. She was on a voyage from London to Cork.

=== Unknown date ===
List of shipwrecks: Unknown date in January 1816
Ship	State	Description
Adventure	United Kingdom	The ship was driven ashore by ice in the Elbe and was seveely damaged. She was on a voyage from Hamburg to London. Adventure was refloated on 9 January and put back to Hamburg.
Alexander and Mary	United Kingdom	The brig was wrecked on the west coast of the Isle of Lewis, Outer Hebrides. She was on a voyage from Quebec City, Lower Canada, British North America to Newcastle upon Tyne, Northumberland.
Albion	United Kingdom	The ship was sailing from Jamaica to London when she put into Charleston in distress. She was condemned there as unseaworthy and sold there on 11 January.
Amelia	(United Kingdom of Great Britain and Ireland) New South Wales	The brig departed Sydney for Java between 8 and 17 January. No further trace, presumed foundered with the loss of all hands.
Assistance	United Kingdom	The ship was driven ashore near Den Helder, North Holland, Netherlands.
Bee	United Kingdom	The ship foundered off the Cornish coast.
Bengal	United States	The ship capsized at Île de France, Mauritius. She was on a voyage from China to Philadelphia, Pennsylvania.
Ceres	United Kingdom	The ship was driven ashore in Loch Indaal. She was on a voyage from the Clyde to Limerick.
Charles	France	The ship was abandoned off Honfleur, Manche. She was on a voyage from Bordeaux, Gironde to Amsterdam, North Holland, Netherlands.
Chasseur	Netherlands	The ship was wrecked on the coast of Galicia, Spain. Her crew were rescued. She was on a voyage from Antwerp to Lisbon, Portugal.
Daageraad	Netherlands	The ship was driven ashore. She was on a voyage from Danzig to Harlingen, Friesland. She was refloated and taken in to Texel, North Holland in a waterlogged condition.
Daphne	United Kingdom	The ship was wrecked on the coast of Sicily. She was on a voyage from Malta to Liverpool, Lancashire.
Dennevitz	Russia	The ship was driven ashore near Den Helder. She was refloated on 12 January.
Diana	United Kingdom	The ship was driven ashore in Loch Indaal. She was on a voyage from Liverpool, Lancashire to Limerick.
Diligence	United Kingdom	The ship departed from Sunderland, County Durham for Aberdeen in mid-January. No further trace, presumed foundered with the loss of all hands.
Five Brothers	United Kingdom	The ship was lost near Bridgwater, Somerset.
Fortitude	Stettin	The ship foundered whilst on a voyage from Bordeaux, Gironde, France to Stettin. Her crew were rescued.
General York	Prussia	The ship was driven ashore on Læsø, Denmark. She was on a voyage from South Shields, County Durham, United Kingdom to Copenhagen, Denmark.
Goede Hoop	Hamburg	The ship was driven ashore in the Elbe. She was on a voyage from Rouen, Seine-Inférieure, France to Hamburg. Goede Hoop was refloated on 9 January and arrived at Hamburg.
Good Intent	United Kingdom	The ship sank in Melloch's Bay, Scotland.
Helens	United Kingdom	The ship was driven ashore. She was on a voyage from Saint Petersburgh, Russia to Leith, Lothian. She was refloated and taken in to Farsund, Norway.
Isabella	United Kingdom	The ship ran aground and was damaged near Calcutta, India. She was on a voyage from Calcutta to Penang. Isabella was later refloated.
Jane	United Kingdom	The ship was wrecked on a reef off Cephalonia, United States of the Ionian Islands.
Jonge Martha	United Kingdom	The ship was driven ashore near Den Helder. She was refloated on 9 January and taken into the Nieuwe Diep.
Liebre	Spain	The ship foundered off Cuba with the loss of all but three of her crew. She was on a voyage from Cádiz to Veracruz, Veracruz, Viceroyalty of New Granada.
Louisa Ulrica	Hamburg	The ship was lost at Cuxhaven. She was on a voyage from London, United Kingdom to Hamburg. Louisa Ulrica was later refloated with the assistance of divers.
Luna	United Kingdom	The ship was driven ashore and wrecked near "Baubiquay". She was on a voyage from Seville, Spain to London.
Maria	Hamburg	The ship was driven ashore and severely damabed by ice in the Elbe. She was on a voyage from Hamburg to Tenerife, Canary Islands. Maria was refloated on 9 January and put back in to Hamburg.
Maria	United Kingdom	The ship was lost on the Saintes. She was on a voyage from Málaga, Spain to Amsterdam, North Holland, Netherlands.
Mercurius	Norway	The ship was driven ashore and wrecked on Rathlin Island, County Antrim, United Kingdom. Her crew were rescued. She was on a voyage from Londonderry, United Kingdom to Trondheim.
Mercury	United Kingdom	The ship ran aground. She was on a voyage from New Orleans, Louisiana United States to Liverpool. She was refloated and taken in to Nassau, Bahamas.
Oscar	United States	The ship was driven ashore on the Dutch coast. She was on a voyage from Baltimore, Maryland to Rotterdam, South Holland, Netherlands. Oscar was later refloated and taken in to Hellevoetsluis, South Holland.
Plenipo	United Kingdom	The ship ran aground on the East Hoyle Sandbank, in Liverpool Bay. She was on a voyage from Exeter, Devon to Liverpool.
Ravensworth	United Kingdom	The ship was driven ashore and damaged in the Elbe. She was on a voyage from Hamburg to Newcastle upon Tyne. Ravensworth was refloated on 9 January and put back in to Hamburg.
Sumatra	France	The ship was driven ashore in the Bahamas. She was on a voyage from Havre de Grâce, Seine-Inférieure to New Orleans. She was refloated and taken in to Nassau.
Talavera	United Kingdom	The ship was driven ashore at Southport, Lancashire. She was on a voyage from Liverpool to Havre de Grâce, Seine-Inférieure, France.
Thomas and Mary	United Kingdom	The ship foundered in the North Sea off Whitby, Yorkshire.
Tay	United Kingdom	The ship sank in Loch Indaal. She was on a voyage from the Clyde to Sligo.
Tyrone	United Kingdom	The ship ran aground on the East Hoyle Sandbank. She was on a voyage from Poole, Dorset to Liverpool.
Vriendschaft	Netherlands	The ship was driven ashore near Den Helder.
Vrouw Swantje	Netherlands	The ship was driven ashore near Den Helder.

== February ==
=== 4 February ===
List of shipwrecks: 4 February 1816
Ship	State	Description
Eners	United Kingdom	The ship foundered in the Atlantic Ocean off Figueira da Foz, Portugal. Her crew were rescued. She was on a voyage from London to St. Ubes, Portugal.
Johanna	Netherlands	The ship was driven ashore and wrecked at Egmond aan Zee, North Holland. She was on a voyage from Bordeaux, Gironde, France to Amsterdam.
Race Horse	United Kingdom	The ship lost her rudder and was abandoned. Her crew were rescued by Adele and Marie (France). Race Horse was on a voyage from Kinsale, County Cork to Newfoundland, British North America.
Shark	United Kingdom	The full-rigged ship was destroyed by fire at Port-au-Prince, Haiti.

=== 6 February ===
List of shipwrecks: 6 February 1816
Ship	State	Description
Harriet	United Kingdom	The ship was lost off Cape St. Mary's, Portugal. Her crew were rescued. She was on a voyage from Livorno, Grand Duchy of Tuscany to London.

=== 7 February ===
List of shipwrecks: 7 February 1816
Ship	State	Description
Ann and Betty	United Kingdom	The ship was driven ashore at Bray, County Wicklow. She was on a voyage from Waterford to Liverpool, Lancashire.
Fingal	United States	The ship was wrecked on the Warren Hastings Shoal, in the Indian Ocean off Java, Netherlands East Indies. Her crew survived. She was on a voyage from New York to China.
Fortitude	United Kingdom	The ship was driven ashore and wrecked at Dover, Kent. Her crew were rescued. She was on a voyage from Dartmouth, Devon to London.
Integrity	United Kingdom	The ship was drivern ashore at Sunderland Bridge, County Durham.
Margaret and Nancy	United Kingdom	The ship was driven ashore and wrecked near Belfast, County Antrim. She was on a voyage from Glasgow, Renfrewshire to Belfast.
Mary Ann	United Kingdom	The ship was driven ashore and wrecked north of Howth, County Dublin with the loss of all hands. She was on a voyage from Newry, County Down to Liverpool.
Mercurius	United Kingdom	The ship foundered in the Atlantic Ocean off Vila do Conde, Portugal with the loss of all but two of her crew. She was on a voyage from Bristol, Gloucestershire to Livorno. Grand Duchy of Tuscany.
Mersey	United Kingdom	The sloop was wrecked at Dublin. Her crew were rescued by the Dublin Lifeboat. She was on a voyage from Limerick to Liverpool, Lancashire.

=== 8 February ===
List of shipwrecks: 8 February 1816
Ship	State	Description
Lord Wellington	United Kingdom	The ship was driven ashore between Deal and Sandwich, Kent whilst on a voyage from London to Jamaica. She was refloated on 11 February and taken in to the River Thames for repairs.

=== 10 February ===
List of shipwrecks: 10 February 1816
Ship	State	Description
Argonaut	United States	The ship sprang a leak and was abandoned in the Atlantic Ocean (37°30′N 71°30′W). The ship came ashore at Cranbury Inlet on 5 March.
Esperanza	Spain	The ship was lost whilst on a voyage from Cartagena to Port Antonio, Jamaica and Saint Domingue.
Harmonie	France	The ship foundered in the Atlantic Ocean off Cape Prior, Spain. Her crew were rescued. She was on a voyage from Labroredut, Finistère to Marseille, Bouches-du-Rhône.
Hero	United Kingdom	The ship was wrecked at Cádiz, Spain with the loss of all but one of her crew. She was on a voyage from Alicante, Spain to Belfast, County Antrim.
Hopewell	United Kingdom	The ship was wrecked at Rota, Cádiz with the loss of three lives. She was on a voyage from Gibraltar to Glasgow, Renfrewshire.
Margaretta Elizabeth	Netherlands	The brig struck a sunken wreck and was damaged. She was on a voyage from Marennes, Charente-Inférieure to Antwerp. She was taken in to Hellevoet, Zeeland.
Polperro	United Kingdom	The ship was driven ashore and wrecked at Sanlúcar de Barrameda, Spain. All on board were rescued. She was on a voyage from Cádiz to Waterford.

=== 11 February ===
List of shipwrecks: 11 February 1816
Ship	State	Description
Constantine Paulowitz	Flag unknown	The ship foundered off Ortegal, Spain. Five of her crew were rescued by Oden (Flag unknown). Constantine Paulowitz was on a voyage from A Coruña to Bilbao, Spain.

=== 13 February ===
List of shipwrecks: 13 February 1816
Ship	State	Description
Anna	Norway	The ship was driven ashore on "Flickero". She was on a voyage from Dublin, United Kingdom to Arendal.
Mary Isabella	United Kingdom	The ship put in tow Whitehaven, Cumberland in a sinking condition. She was on a voyage from Liverpool, Lancashire to Waterford.
Speculation	United Kingdom	The ship foundered in the Atlantic Ocean. Her crew were rescued. She was on a voyage from A Coruña, Spain to Lisbon, Portugal.

=== 14 February ===
List of shipwrecks: 14 February 1816
Ship	State	Description
Emilia	Portugal	The ship was lost in the Straits of Gaspar. She was on a voyage from China to Lisbon.
Hope	United Kingdom	The ship was driven ashore on the west coast of Bermuda. She was on a voyage from Guadeloupe to Halifax, Nova Scotia, British North America.

=== 16 February ===
List of shipwrecks: 16 February 1816
Ship	State	Description
Belise	United Kingdom	The ship was driven ashore at Hoylake, Lancashire. She was on a voyage from Savannah, Georgia, United States to Liverpool, Lancashire.
Bella Alianza	Portugal	The abandoned ship was discovered off the Berlengas by HMS Wasp (Royal Navy). Bella Alianza was on a voyage from Maranhão, United Kingdom of Portugal, Brazil and the Algarves to Lisbon. She was towed in to Gibraltar.
Catherine	United Kingdom	The sloop foundered in the Irish Sea off the coast of Caernarfonshire. Her crew were rescued. She was on a voyage from Westport, County Mayo to Liverpool, Lancashire.
Maria	Norway	The ship was driven ashore and sank in the Shetland Islands, United Kingdom. She was on a voyage from St. Ubes, Portugal to Trondheim.
Unnamed	United Kingdom	The barge sank at Falmouth, Cornwall with the loss of two lives.

=== 17 February ===
List of shipwrecks: 17 February 1816
Ship	State	Description
Rigersdaal	Netherlands	The ship was driven ashore at Medemblik, North Holland. She was on a voyage from Havana, Cuba to Amsterdam.
Vries en Hoop	Netherlands	The ship was driven ashore at Medemblik. She was on a voyage from Surinam to Amsterdam.

=== 18 February ===
List of shipwrecks: 18 February 1816
Ship	State	Description
Johanna Catherina	Norway	The ship was wrecked on the coast of Jutland. She was on a voyage from Ireland to Norway.
Sarah Ann	United Kingdom	The ship was driven ashore at Scheveningen, South Holland, Netherlands. She was on a voyage from Liverpool, Lancashire to Rotterdam, South Holland.

=== 19 February ===
List of shipwrecks: 19 February 1816
Ship	State	Description
Percy	United Kingdom	The ship was destroyed by fire at Saugur, India. Her crew were rescued. She was on a voyage from Bengal to Bencoolen, India and an English port.

=== 20 February ===
List of shipwrecks: 20 February 1816
Ship	State	Description
HMS Phoenix	Royal Navy	The Perseverance-class frigate was driven ashore and wrecked at Smyrna, Ottoman Empire. Her crew survived. The wreck was set afire on 2 March.

=== 22 February ===
List of shipwrecks: 22 February 1816
Ship	State	Description
Susan	United Kingdom	The ship ran aground on the Shivering Sand. She was on a voyage from Virginia, United States to London. She was refloated on 24 February and taken in to the River Thames.

=== 24 February ===
List of shipwrecks: 24 February 1816
Ship	State	Description
Margaret	United Kingdom	The ship was reported to have foundered off Berbice. She was on a voyage from Sunderland, County Durham to Aberdeen.
Palafox	United Kingdom	The ship ran aground on the Owers Sandbank, in the English Channel and was severely damaged. She was on a voyage from Portsmouth, Hampshire to Lisbon. Palafox put back in to Portsmouth.

=== 25 February ===
List of shipwrecks: 25 February 1816
Ship	State	Description
Alice	United States	The ship ran aground off Vlissingen, Zeeland, Netherlands. She was on a voyage from Antwerp, Netherlands to New York.
Friends	United Kingdom	The transport ship was driven ashore at Rye, Sussex. She was on a voyage from Portsmouth, Hampshire to Ostend, West Flanders, Netherlands. Friends was later refloated and taken in to Dover, Kent.
George	United Kingdom	The ship was driven ashore at Greenwich, Kent. She was refloated but discovered to be severely damaged. George was on a voyage from Pernambuco, Brazil to London.
Nossa Senhora de Livramento	Portugal	The ship ran aground and sank at Havre de Grâce, Seine-Inférieure, France. She was on a voyage from Faial Island, Azores to Havre de Grâce.
Peggy	United Kingdom	The sloop foundered in the North Sea off Bervie, Aberdeenshire with the loss of three of her four crew.
Sultana	United Kingdom	The ship was destroyed by fire at Bengal, India. Her crew were rescued.

=== 26 February ===
List of shipwrecks: 26 February 1816
Ship	State	Description
La Lis	United States	The ship foundered in the North Sea off Vlissingen, Zeeland, Netherlands. All on board were rescued.

=== 27 February ===
List of shipwrecks: 27 February 1816
Ship	State	Description
Caledonia	United Kingdom	The steamboat ran agroud in the Clyde with the loss of her pilot.
Swiftsure	United Kingdom	The smack was run down and sunk in the North Sea off Flamborough Head, Yorkshire by Robert (United Kingdom) with the loss of all but one of her crew. Swiftsure was on a voyage from Montrose, Forfarshire to London.

=== 28 February ===
List of shipwrecks: 28 February 1816
Ship	State	Description
Lively	United Kingdom	The ship caught fire and was beached at Landguard Fort, Suffolk. She was subsequently taken in to Harwich, Essex.
Sanderson	United Kingdom	The ship was driven ashore at Wells-next-the-Sea, Norfolk. Her crew were rescued.
Speculation	United Kingdom	The ship foundered whilst on a voyage from A Coruña, Spain to Lisbon, Portugal. Her crew were rescued.

=== Unknown date ===
List of shipwrecks: Unknown date in February 1816
Ship	State	Description
Achilles	United Kingdom	The ship was wrecked at Martha's Industry, Georgia, United States.
Alexander	Prussia	The ship sprang a leak and was beached at Schagen, North Holland, Netherlands in early February. She was on a voyage from Königsburg to Oporto, Portugal.
Almira	United States	The ship foundered in the Atlantic Ocean with the loss of all hands. She was on a voyage from Madeira, Portugal to Portsmouth, New Hampshire.
Bella Allianza	Portugal	The ship was discovered off the Berlengas dismasted and crewless by HMS Wasp (Royal Navy). She was towed in to Gibraltar. Bella Allianza was on a voyage from Maranhão, Brazil to Lisbon.
D'Jacob	Netherlands	The galiot was driven ashore and wrecked near Padstow, Cornwall, United Kingdom. She was on a voyage from Cádiz, Spain to Amsterdam, North Holland.
Fortuna	Norway	The ship was wrecked on the Norwegian coast. She was on a voyage from Sint Maarten to Trondheim.
Frederickstein	United Kingdom	The ship foundered on a voyage from Montevideo to Rio de Janeiro on or before 9 February. Her crew were rescued.
Friends Integrity	United Kingdom	The ship foundered in the Dogger Bank with the loss of two of her crew.
Grey	United Kingdom	The sloop was driven ashore and wrecked 4 leagues (12 nautical miles (22 km)) north of Figueira da Foz, Portugal. She was on a voyage from London to Lisbon, Portugal.
Harmonie	France	The ship foundered in the Atlantic Ocean off Madeira, Portugal. She was on a voyage from Nantes, Loire-Inférieure to Martinique.
Hercules	United Kingdom	The ship foundered in the Atlantic Ocean off Charleston, South Carolina. She was on a voyage from Jamaica to Charleston.
Jane	(United Kingdom of Great Britain and Ireland) Virgin Islands	The cutter was wrecked on the north coast of Tortola in late February.
Johanna Sophia	Netherlands	The ship was wrecked on the coast of Essex, United Kingdom.
John & Mary	United Kingdom	The ship was wrecked on the west coast of Ireland. She was on a voyage from Galway to Liverpool, Lancashire.
Little Dick	United States	The ship was wrecked at Wilmington, Delaware. She was on a voyage from Jamaica to Wilmington.
May Flower	United Kingdom	The ship sank at Cork.
Minerva	United Kingdom	The snow sank at Harwich, Essex.
Morrell	United States	The ship was driven ashore and wrecked on Langlee Island, Massachusetts with the loss of two of her crew. She was on a voyage from Boston, Massachusetts to Newfoundland.
Rover	United Kingdom	The ship was wrecked on the Portuguese coast in early February with the loss of all hands. She was on a voyage from Newfoundland to Oporto.
Volharding	Netherlands	The ship ran aground in the Scheldt. She was on a voyage from London to Antwerp.
Unnamed	United Kingdom,	The brig was wrecked at Milltown Malbay, County Clare.

== March ==
=== 1 March ===
List of shipwrecks: 1 March 1816
Ship	State	Description
Charming Sally	United States	The schooner struck a reef in the Atlantic Ocean and was wrecked. Her eight crew survived.
Isaac	(United Kingdom of Great Britain and Ireland) Saint Vincent	The sloop foundered in the St. Lucia Channel. Her crew were rescued.
Phœnix	United Kingdom	The ship was wrecked on the Maranilla Reef. Her crew were rescued. She was on a voyage from Havana, Cuba to Nassau, Bahamas.
Success	United Kingdom	The ship ran aground on the Fairness Rock, off Margate, Kent and sank. She was on a voyage from Swanage, Dorset to London.
William and Mary	United Kingdom	The sloop was wrecked near Padstow, Cornwall. Her crew were rescued. She was on a voyage from Bridgwater, Somerset to Padstow.

=== 2 March ===
List of shipwrecks: 2 March 1816
Ship	State	Description
Claudine	France	The ship was driven ashore at Lillo, Antwerp, Netherlands. She was on a voyage from Batavia, Netherlands East Indies to Antwerp. Claudine was later refloated.
John	United Kingdom	The ship was run ashore and severely damaged at Dover, Kent. She was on a voyage from Newcastle upon Tyne, Northumberland to Rouen, Seine-Inférieure, France. John was later refloated and taken in to Dover.
Orion	France	The ship was struck by lightning and sunk at L'Aiguillon-sur-Mer, Vendée. Her crew were rescued. She was on a voyage from Bordeaux, Gironde to Marseille, Bouches-du-Rhône.

=== 3 March ===
List of shipwrecks: 3 March 1816
Ship	State	Description
Flinders	United Kingdom	The ship ran aground and was wrecked off the Laccadive Islands. Her crew were rescued. She was on a voyage from Mauritius to Calcutta, India.
Kron Prins	Netherlands	The ship ran aground and was damaged in the Nieuw Diep. She was on a voyage from Amsterdam, North Holland to Livorno, Grand Duchy of Tuscany. Kron Prins was subsequently refloated.
Ocean	United Kingdom	The ship was driven ashore at Gibraltar. She was on a voyage from New York, United States to Gibraltar.
Velina	United Kingdom	The ship was wrecked at Savannah, Georgia, United States.

=== 4 March ===
List of shipwrecks: 4 March 1816
Ship	State	Description
Baltimore	United States	The ship was abandoned in the Atlantic Ocean (47°05′N 11°36′W) whilst on a voyage from Liverpool, Lancashire, United Kingdom to Baltimore, Maryland. She was discovered by Rapid (United Kingdom) and taken in to Falmouth, Cornwall, United Kingdom.
Favourite	United Kingdom	The ship foundered 80 nautical miles (150 km) off the mouth of the Surinam River. Her crew were rescued. She was on a voyage from Surinam to Cork.
James	United Kingdom	The abandoned brig was taken in to "Melon", Finistère, France.

=== 5 March ===
List of shipwrecks: 5 March 1816
Ship	State	Description
Elizabeth	United Kingdom	The ship was driven ashore at Formby, Lancashire. She was on a voyage from Dumfries to Liverpool, Lancashire.
Favourite	United Kingdom	The ship foundered in the Atlantic Ocean 80 nautical miles (150 km) off the mouth of the Surinam River. Her crew were rescued.
Johanna Carolina	Sweden	The galiot was lost near Quimper, Finistère, France. Her crew were rescued. She was on a voyage from Marseille, Bouches-du-Rhône, France to Hamburg.
HMS Liverpool	Royal Navy	The Endymion-class frigate was driven ashore and severely damaged at Dover, Kent. She was later refloated and taken in to The Downs.

=== 6 March ===
List of shipwrecks: 6 March 1816
Ship	State	Description
Chesterfield Packet	United Kingdom	The ship was driven ashore at Gibraltar. She was on a voyage from Falmouth, Cornwall to Gibraltar. She was refloated the next day.
Eliza	United Kingdom	The ship was wrecked on the Grand Reef, off Negril, Jamaica. She was on a voyage from Saint John, New Brunswick, British North America to Jamaica.
Minerva	United Kingdom	The ship was lost in the Abaco Oslands. She was on a voyage from New York to Havana, Cuba.

=== 7 March ===
List of shipwrecks: 7 March 1816
Ship	State	Description
HMS Ister	Royal Navy	The Scamander-class frigate ran aground off Cape de Gat, Spain with the loss of nine or eleven of her crew. She was later refloated with assistance from "HMS Arachar" and HMS Montagu (Royal Navy) and was towed in to Gibraltar on 24 March.

=== 8 March ===
List of shipwrecks: 8 March 1816
Ship	State	Description
Eliza	United Kingdom	The ship was wrecked on the Grand Reef, off Negril, Jamaica. She was on a voyage from Saint John, New Brunswick, British North America to Jamaica.
Minerva	United States	The ship was wrecked in the Abaco Islands. She was on a voyage from New York to Havana, Cuba.
Plymouth	United Kingdom	The brig was driven ashore and wrecked at Blakeney, Norfolk.

=== 11 March ===
List of shipwrecks: 11 March 1816
Ship	State	Description
Betty	United Kingdom	The ship was driven ashore at Littlehampton, Sussex. She was on a voyage from Sunderland, County Durham to Littlehampton.

=== 12 March ===
List of shipwrecks: 12 March 1816
Ship	State	Description
Goed Hoop	Netherlands	The ship struck the pier and sank at Porthleven, Cornwall, United Kingdom. She was on a voyage from St. Ubes, Portugal to Antwerp.
Swift	United Kingdom	The ship was run down and sunk by a collier with the loss of nineteen of the twenty people on board.

=== 13 March ===
List of shipwrecks: 13 March 1816
Ship	State	Description
Batidor	Spain	The ship was wrecked 13 leagues (39 nautical miles (72 km)) from Gijón. She was on a voyage from London, United Kingdom to Rivadeo, Gijón and Santander.
Charles	United Kingdom	The ship was driven ashore in the River Mersey. She was on a voyage from Liverpool, Lancashire to New York, United States. She was refloated and put back to Liverpool.
Freyheit	Flag unknown	The ship was driven ashore and wrecked near Dover, Kent, United Kingdom. Her crew were rescued. She was on a voyage from Havre de Grâce, Seine-Inférieure, France to London, United Kingdom.
Hoffnung	Stralsund	The ship was driven ashore at Hythe, Kent and was abandoned by her crew. She was refloated and taken in to Folkestone Kent.
Sophia Vorbrodt	Flag unknown	The ship was wrecked on Texel, North Holland, Netherlands. Her crew were rescued.

=== 14 March ===
List of shipwrecks: 14 March 1816
Ship	State	Description
Albion	United Kingdom	The ship was beached at Demerara. She was on a voyage from Demerara to Dublin. She was refloated but found to be severely damaged.
Caroline	United Kingdom	The ship was driven ashore at Portsmouth, Hampshire. She was refloated but drove on shore again. Caroline was on a voyage from Portsmouth to Southampton, Hampshire.
Harrington	United Kingdom	The ship sprang a leak and foundered in the Atlantic Ocean off Padstow, Cornwall. Her crew were rescued. She was on a voyage from Cork to London.

=== 15 March ===
List of shipwrecks: 15 March 1816
Ship	State	Description
Antiope	United Kingdom	The ship was wrecked on Scroby Sands, Norfolk. Her crew were rescued. She was on a voyage from Newcastle upon Tyne, Northumberland to London.
Curaçoa	Netherlands	The ship was driven ashore and wrecked at "Wereingen". She was on a voyage from Amsterdam, North Holland to Curaçao.
Hazard	Netherlands	The ship was driven ashore at Vlissingen, Zeeland. She was on a voyage from Charleston, South Carolina, United States to Antwerp. Hazard was later refloated and taken in to Vlissingen.
Sarah Johansen	Netherlands	The ship ran aground off Texel, North Holland. She was on a voyage from Genoa, Ligurian Republic to Amsterdam, North Holland. Sarah Johansen was refloated on 18 March and arrived at Amsterdam on 21 March.

=== 16 March ===
List of shipwrecks: 16 March 1816
Ship	State	Description
Antiope	United Kingdom	The ship was wrecked on Scroby Sands, Norfolk. Her crew were rescued. She was on a voyage from Newcastle upon Tyne, Northumberland to London.
Maria	Norway	The ship was driven ashore and sunk in the Shetland Islands, United Kingdom. She was on a voyage from St. Ubes, Portugal to Trondheim.
Retablissment	France	The ship was wrecked at Ringkøbing, Denmark. She was on a voyage from London, United Kingdom to Danzig.

=== 17 March ===
List of shipwrecks: 17 March 1816
Ship	State	Description
George	United Kingdom	The ship was driven ashore and damaged near Gothenburg, Sweden. She was on a voyage from Newcastle upon Tyne, Northumberland to a Baltic port. George was refloated the next day.
Margaret	United Kingdom	The ship was driven ashore near Vlissingen, Zeeland, Netherlands. She was on a voyage from Antwerp, Netherlands to Liverpool, Lancashire. Margaret was later refloated.

=== 18 March ===
List of shipwrecks: 18 March 1816
Ship	State	Description
Ariadne	United States	The ship was wrecked on the Isle of Lewis, United Kingdom. She was on a voyage from Stromness, Orkney Islands, United Kingdom to Boston, Massachusetts.
Catharine	United Kingdom	The ship was driven ashore near "Alemouth". She was on a voyage from Sunderland, County Durham to Aberdeen.
Donald	United Kingdom	The ship was driven ashore and damaged in Church Bay, Rathlin Island, County Antrim. She was on a voyage from Liverpool, Lancashire to Antigua. Donald was refloated on 20 March, and put into the Clyde on 1 April.
Hope	United Kingdom	The ship was driven ashore at Wells-next-the-Sea, Norfolk.
Melantho	United Kingdom	The ship was wrecked at Milltown Malbay, County Clare with the loss of all 20 people on board. She was on a voyage from Limerick to Barcelona.
Peggy	United Kingdom	The ship was driven ashore and wrecked near the mouth of the River Spey. Her crew were rescued. She was on a voyage from Aberdeen to Cromarty.
Sophia	Flag unknown	The ship was lost off Texel, North Holland, Netherlands. Her crew were rescued.

=== 19 March ===
List of shipwrecks: 19 March 1816
Ship	State	Description
America	United States	The ship was driven ashore at Liverpool, Lancashire, United Kingdom. She was on a voyage from Liverpool to New York.
Arabella	United Kingdom	The ship was driven ashore at Liverpool. She was on a voyage from Liverpool to Pará, Brazil.
Eleanor	United Kingdom	The ship was driven ashore on The Shingles, Isle of Wight. She was on a voyage from Waterford to Southampton, Hampshire.
Ida	United Kingdom	The ship was driven ashore at "Shelburn". Her crew were rescued.
James	United Kingdom	The whaler was driven ashore at Liverpool. She was on a voyage from Liverpool to Greenland. James was later refloated.
Mary Ann	United Kingdom	The ship collided with a sloop in Hollesley Bay and was damaged. She was on a voyage from Great Yarmouth, Norfolk to Liverpool. She put back to Great Yarmouth.
Richard Staples	United Kingdom	The ship was driven ashore at Liverpool. She was on a voyage from Buenos Aires to Liverpool.
Sachem	United States	The ship was driven ashore at Liverpool. She was on a voyage from Savannah, Georgia, United States to Liverpool. Sachem was later refloated and taken in to Liverpool.
Thomas Gibbons	United Kingdom	The ship was driven ashore at Liverpool. She was on a voyage from Liverpool to Savannah. Thomas Gibbons was later refloated.

=== 20 March ===
List of shipwrecks: 20 March 1816
Ship	State	Description
Arabella	United Kingdom	The ship was driven ashore at Liverpool, Lancashire. she was on a voyage from Liverpool to Pará, Brazil.
Eleanor	United Kingdom	The ship ran aground on The Shingles, off the Isle of Wight. She was on a voyage from Waterford to Southampton, Hampshire.
Maria Elizabeth	France	The ship was driven ashore and wrecked on Læsø, Denmark. Her crew were rescued. She was on a voyage from Bordeaux, Gironde to Wismar.
Mary Ann	United Kingdom	The ship was wrecked on the West Hoyle Sandbank, in Liverpool Bay. She was on a voyage from Waterford to Liverpool, Lancashire.
Patriarch	United Kingdom	The ship foundered in the North Sea off Hellevoetsluis, Zeeland, Netherlands with the loss of nine of her crew.

=== 23 March ===
List of shipwrecks: 23 March 1816
Ship	State	Description
Defiance	United Kingdom	The ship was driven ashore at Deal, Kent. She was refloated but was consequently beached.
Duke of Wellington	United Kingdom	The ship was driven ashore a second time and wrecked at Bermuda, Having previously been ashore and refloated before 15 March. She was on a voyage from London to Bermuda and Jamaica.
La Balance	France	The transport ship, a brig, was wrecked on the coast of Jersey, Channel Islands with the loss of 36 of the 108 people on board. She was on a voyage from Cherbourg, Manche to Saint-Malo, Ille-et-Vilaine.

=== 24 March ===
List of shipwrecks: 25 March 1816
Ship	State	Description
Two Friends	United Kingdom	The ship ran aground near Lillo, Antwerp, Netherlands. She was on a voyage from Plymouth, Devon to Antwerp.

=== 25 March ===
List of shipwrecks: 25 March 1816
Ship	State	Description
Ambrosia	United Kingdom	The ship ran aground on the Tongue Sand, in the North Sea. She was refloated with assistance and taken in to Whitstable, Kent.
Shannon	United States	The ship foundered off Dunoff Head, County Donegal, United Kingdom with the loss of all hands. She was on a voyage from New York to Drogheda, County Louth, United Kingdom.

=== 26 March ===
List of shipwrecks: 26 March 1816
Ship	State	Description
Hermina	Netherlands	The ship was driven ashore in the Courantyne River, Surinam. She was on a voyage from Amsterdam, North Holland to Berbice. It was reported that Hermina was expected to be refloated around 9 April.
Nile	United States	The ship was wrecked on Little Inagua, Bahamas. Her crew were rescued. She was on a voyage from New York to Savannah-la-Mar, Jamaica.

=== 27 March ===
List of shipwrecks: 27 March 1816
Ship	State	Description
Navigator	United Kingdom	The ship ran aground off Rota, Cádiz, Spain. She was on a voyage from Waterford to Cádiz. She was refloated on or about 12 April.
Piecade	Portugal	The ship ran aground at Charleston, South Carolina, United States. She was on a voyage from Charleston to Lisbon. She was refloated and put back to Charleston in a leaky condition.

=== 30 March ===
List of shipwrecks: 30 March 1816
Ship	State	Description
Three Sons	United States	The brig was wrecked on the coast of Patagonia. Her crew were rescued.

=== Unknown date ===
List of shipwrecks: Unknown date in March 1816
Ship	State	Description
Anglem	United Kingdom	The ship was driven ashore at Point of Ayre, Isle of Man. She was on a voyage from Maryport, Cumberland to Quebec City, Lower Canada, British North America.
Ceres	United Kingdom	The ship was abandoned off the west coast of Ireland. She was on a voyage from Leith, Lothian to Limerick.
Donald	United Kingdom	The ship was driven ashore on Rathlin Island, County Antrim. She was on a voyage from Liverpool, Lancashire to Antigua.
Drie Gebroeders	Kingdom of Hanover	The ship was wrecked on Heligoland. Her crew were rescued. She was on a voyage from Harwich, Essex, United Kingdom to Emden.
Enigkeit	Bremen	The ship ran aground in the Jade and was wrecked. She was on a voyage from London, United Kingdom to Bremen.
Exchange	United States	The ship was wrecked near Les Sables d'Olonne, Vendée, France. Her crew were rescued. She was on a voyage from La Rochelle, Vendée to Puerto Rico.
Fortuna	Norway	The ship was lost on the Norwegian coast. She was on a voyage from St Martin's to Trondheim.
General Cockburn	United Kingdom	The ship was wrecked near Les Sables d'Olonne. She was on a voyage from La Rochelle to the United States.
Good Intent	United Kingdom	The ship sank at Liverpool.
James	United Kingdom	The brig was abandoned off Finistère, France before 4 March. She was subsequently taken in to "Melon", Finistère.
Mary	United Kingdom	The ship sprang a leak and foundered in the Mediterranean Sea in early March. She was on a voyage from Madeira, Portugal to Livorno, Grand Duchy of Tuscany. At least three of her crew survived.
Perseverance	United Kingdom	The ship ran aground in Loch Eriboll. She was on a voyage from Drontheim, Norway to Dublin.
Pomona	France	The ship was driven ashore at Dieppe, Seine-Inférieure. She was on a voyage from London, United Kingdom to Havre de Grâce, Seine-Inférieure.
Princess Charlotte of Wales	United Kingdom	The ship ran aground on the Pullcat Shoal. She was refloated and taken in to Bombay, India.
Waterloo	United Kingdom	The ship was driven ashore at Cape Romum, South Carolina, United States. She was on a voyage from Bristol, Gloucestershire to Charleston, South Carolina. She was refloated and completed her voyage, arriving on 22 March.
Unnamed	Flag unknown	The sloop was drive ashore at Point of Ayre.

== April ==
=== 1 April ===
List of shipwrecks: 1 April 1816
Ship	State	Description
Ann & Fanny	United Kingdom	The ship was wrecked on the Platter Rocks, in the Irish Sea. She was on a voyage from Chester, Cheshire to Dublin.

== 3 April ==
List of shipwrecks: 3 April 1816
Ship	State	Description
Unnamed	France	The ship was wrecked on Læsø, Denmark.

=== 5 April ===
List of shipwrecks: 5 April 1816
Ship	State	Description
Fanny	United Kingdom	The ship was wrecked on a reef off St. Domingo. She was on a voyage from Kingston, Jamaica to St. Domingo.

=== 6 April ===
List of shipwrecks: 6 April 1816
Ship	State	Description
Rein Deer	United States	The ship was driven ashore on Bush Island. She was on a voyage from Naples to Boston, Massachusetts. Rein Deer was refloated and arrived at Boston on 10 April.

=== 7 April ===
List of shipwrecks: 7 April 1816
Ship	State	Description
Europe	United Kingdom	The ship was destroyed by fire off Antigua with the loss of a crew member. She was on a voyage from Liverpool, Lancashire to Antigua.
Frau Maria	Netherlands	The ship caught fire off Copenhagen, Denmark. She was on a voyage from Copenhagen to Amsterdam, North Holland. Frau Maria put back to Copenhagen for repairs.
Jane	(United Kingdom of Great Britain and Ireland) Guernsey	The ship was wrecked at Brielle, South Holland, Netherlands. Her crew were rescued. She was on a voyage from Guernsey to Rotterdam, South Holland.
Peggy	United Kingdom	The ship was wrecked near Aberdeen. Her crew were rescued.
Penrhyn Castle	United Kingdom	The snow came in to Cowes having lost her mast and having sustained other damage.

=== 9 April ===
List of shipwrecks: 9 April 1816
Ship	State	Description
Two Friends	United Kingdom	The ship was driven ashore at Tarragona, Spain. Her crew were rescued. She was refloated on 15 April.

=== 10 April ===
List of shipwrecks: 10 April 1816
Ship	State	Description
Mary	United Kingdom	The schooner was wrecked on the Garth Banks.
Samuel	United Kingdom	The ship foundered in the Bristol Channel off Bull Point, Devon. Her crew were rescued. She was on a voyage from Barnstaple, Devon to a Welsh port.

=== 11 April ===
List of shipwrecks: 11 April 1816
Ship	State	Description
Bell	United Kingdom	The ship foundered in the North Sea. She was on a voyage from South Shields, County Durham to Portsmouth, Hampshire.

=== 12 April ===
List of shipwrecks: 12 April 1816
Ship	State	Description
Earl of Fife	United Kingdom	The whaler was wrecked at Banff, Aberdeenshire.

=== 14 April ===
List of shipwrecks: 14 April 1816
Ship	State	Description
Ann and Elizabeth	United Kingdom	The oyster smack foundered in the English Channel off the Isle of Wight with the loss of two of her six crew. She was on a voyage from Brest, Finistère, France to London.
Hyndman	United Kingdom	The ship was driven ashore in Carlisle Bay. She was on a voyage from Dublin to Cork and Barbados.

=== 15 April ===
List of shipwrecks: 15 April 1816
Ship	State	Description
HMS Iphigenia	Royal Navy	The Perseverance-class frigate ran aground in the Hooghly River at Calcutta, India. She was refloated.
Mary	United States	The ship was driven ashore at Currituck, North Carolina. She was on a voyage from Norfolk, Virginia to Trinidad.

=== 17 April ===
List of shipwrecks: 17 April 1816
Ship	State	Description
Ariadne	United Kingdom	The ship was wrecked on a reef off Montevideo. Her crew were rescued. She was on a voyage from Buenos Aires to Montevideo.

=== 18 April ===
List of shipwrecks: 18 April 1816
Ship	State	Description
Speedwell	United Kingdom	The ship foundered off the Isle of Man. She was on a voyage from Newry, County Antrim to Liverpool, Lancashire.

=== 19 April ===
List of shipwrecks: 19 April 1816
Ship	State	Description
Amalia	United Kingdom	The ship ran aground at St. Ubes, Portugal. She was on a voyage from St. Ubes to a Baltic port. She was refloated and put back to St. Ubes in a leaky condition.
Lady Hood	United Kingdom	The ship was driven ashore in the River Plate. She was on a voyage from Buenos Aires to Lisbon, Portugal and Cádiz, Spain. Lady Hood was later refloated and towed in to Ensinado.

=== 20 April ===
List of shipwrecks: 20 April 1816
Ship	State	Description
Active	United Kingdom	The ship was lost in Freshwater Bay, Newfoundland. She was on a voyage from Greenock, Renfrewshire to Montreal, Lower Canada, British North America.

=== 22 April ===
List of shipwrecks: 23 April 1816
Ship	State	Description
James	United Kingdom	The ship struck a rock off Nidingen, Sweden. She was on a voyage from Newcastle upon Tyne, Northumberland to Memel, Prussia. She put in to Gothenburg, Sweden.

=== 23 April ===
List of shipwrecks: 23 April 1816
Ship	State	Description
Bella Maria	Spain	The schooner capsized in the Atlantic Ocean. She was on a voyage from Africa to Havana, Cuba.
Flora	United Kingdom	The ship was lost in the Bahamas. Her crew were rescued. She was on a voyage from Havana to Guernsey, Channel Islands.
Letitia	United Kingdom	The ship was driven ashore on the Isle of Fiana. She was on a voyage from Jamaica to Liverpool, Lancashire and Belfast, County Antrim. Letitia was refloated on 27 April.
Methven Castle	United Kingdom	The ship ran aground on the Pagan Sand, in the North Sea. She was on a voyage from London to Hamburg. She was later refloated and taken in to Hamburg.
Rising Hope	United Kingdom	The ship foundered in the Atlantic Ocean off Cape Race, Newfoundland, British North America. All on board were rescued. She was on a voyage from Liverpool. Lancashire to Montreal, British North America.

=== 24 April ===
List of shipwrecks: 24 April 1816
Ship	State	Description
Philip	United States	The ship was struck by a whale and sunk in the Atlantic Ocean. All on board were rescued. She was on a voyage from Bordeaux, Gironde, France to Charleston, South Carolina.

=== Unknown date ===
List of shipwrecks: Unknown date in April 1816
Ship	State	Description
Anglo	Grand Duchy of Tuscany	The ship was wrecked between Cape Bon, Beylik of Tunis and Susa, Tripolitania before 20 April. Her crew were rescued. She was on a voyage from Susa to Livorno.
Fair Reaper	United Kingdom	The ship foundered off Wexford. She was on a voyage from Cork to Dublin.
General Lecor	United Kingdom	The ship capsized at Cork.
Invija	Portugal	The ship was lost on the coast of Galicia, Spain with the loss of all but her captain. She was on a voyage from Oporto to Amsterdam, North Holland, Netherlands.
Mowbray	United Kingdom	The brig was lost in the English Channel off Seaford, Sussex. Her crew were rescued. She was on a voyage from Brighton, Sussex to Sunderland, County Durham.
Samuel	United Kingdom	The ship foundered in Barnstaple Bay. Her crew were rescued. She was on a voyage from Neath, Glamorgan to Barnstaple, Devon.
San Antonio	Portugal	The sumacca ran aground on the English Bank, in the River Plate and was abandoned. She was reported to have been drifting in the river for at least two months before coming ashore in early June.
Sunbury	United Kingdom	The ship was driven ashore at Georgetown in early April. She was on a voyage from Georgetown to Liverpool, Lancashire. She was later refloated and put into Charleston, South Carolina, United States for repairs.

== May ==
=== 1 May ===
List of shipwrecks: 1 May 1816
Ship	State	Description
Rhoda	United Kingdom	The ship was driven ashore near Cape de Gatt, Spain. She was on a voyage from London to Livorno, Grand Duchy of Tuscany. She was refloated and taken in to Almería, Spain in a severely damaged condition. Subsequently taken to Cartagena, Spain for repairs.

=== 2 May ===
List of shipwrecks: 2 May 1816
Ship	State	Description
Albertine Mariane	Netherlands	The ship ran aground off Dragør, Denmark. She was on a voyage from Memel, Prussia to Amsterdam, North Holland. Albertine Mariane was refloated before 11 May and resumed her voyage.
Juno	Stettin	The ship was driven ashore at Pillau. She was on a voyage from Bordeaux, Gironde, France to Stettin. Juno was refloated and put into Pillau on 3 May.

=== 4 May ===
List of shipwrecks: 4 May 1816
Ship	State	Description
Emanuel	Norway	The ship was lost near "Runo" with the loss of all but one of her crew. She was on a voyage from a Mediterranean port to Riga, Russia.
Justina Sophia	Netherlands	The ship was wrecked at Brielle, South Holland. Her crew were rescued.

=== 5 May ===
List of shipwrecks: 5 May 1816
Ship	State	Description
Mary	United Kingdom	The ship was driven ashore and damaged on Læsø, Denmark. She was on a voyage from London to Saint Petersburg, Russia. Mary was later refloated and put into Copenhagen, Denmark for repairs.
Providence	United Kingdom	The ship was driven ashore near Danzig with the loss of four of her crew. She was on a voyage from Liverpool, Lancashire to Danzig.
Vrouw Maria	Netherlands	The ship was driven ashore and wrecked near Egmond aan Zee, North Holland. Her crew were rescued. She was on a voyage from London, United Kingdom to Amsterdam, North Holland.

=== 6 May ===
List of shipwrecks: 7 May 1816
Ship	State	Description
Carl Anton	Sweden	The ship was driven ashore near Kalfsund.

=== 7 May ===
List of shipwrecks: 7 May 1816
Ship	State	Description
Hinchinbrooke	United Kingdom	The packet ship was wrecked on Cape St. Vincent, Portugal. All on board were rescued. She was on a voyage from Falmouth, Cornwall to a Mediterranean port.

=== 8 May ===
List of shipwrecks: 8 May 1816
Ship	State	Description
Alexander	Prussia	The ship ran aground on the Banyaard Sand, in the North Sea off the Dutch coast. She was on a voyage from Königsberg to Antwerp, Netherlands. She was refloated the next day and taken in to "Ter Veer" in a leaky condition.

=== 9 May ===
List of shipwrecks: 9 May 1816
Ship	State	Description
Carl Anton	Sweden	The ship was driven ashore at Kalvsund. She was on a voyage from Liverpool, Lancashire, United Kingdom to Gothenburg.
Unnamed	United Kingdom	The transport ship was wrecked near Calais, France. Her crew were rescued.

=== 15 May ===
List of shipwrecks: 15 May 1816
Ship	State	Description
Spartan	Flag unknown	The ship ran ashore at St. Margaret's Bay, Kent. She was on a voyage from Bremen to Boston. She was refloated with assistance and resumed her voyage.

=== 16 May ===
List of shipwrecks: 16 May 1816
Ship	State	Description
Amis	France	The ship was driven ashore near Broadstairs, Kent, United Kingdom. She was on a voyage from Calais to London, United Kingdom. She was refloated and put in to Ramsgate, Kent.
Collingwood	United Kingdom	The ship was driven ashore and wrecked on Gigha, Argyllshire. She was on a voyage from Trinidad to the Clyde.

=== 18 May ===
List of shipwrecks: 18 May 1816
Ship	State	Description
Active	Hamburg	The ship ran aground on the Goodwin Sands, Kent, United Kingdom. She was refloated but was subsequently beached at Deal, Kent and then taken in to Dover, Kent. Active was on a voyage from Lisbon, Portugal to Hamburg.
Telemaque	Sweden	The ship was abandoned in the North Sea (56°28′N 6°05′E). Five crew were rescued by a Dutch fishing boat. She was on a voyage from Uddevalla to Cádiz, Spain.

=== 23 May ===
List of shipwrecks: 23 May 1816
Ship	State	Description
Dash	United Kingdom	The ship was wrecked on a reef off Anegada, Virgin Islands. Her crew survived. She was on a voyage from Puerto Rico to Barbados.
Vrow Catharina	Hamburg	The ship was wrecked off Ameland, Friesland, Netherlands. Her crew were rescued. She was on a voyage from Hamburg to Dunkerque, Nord, France.

=== 24 May ===
List of shipwrecks: 24 May 1816
Ship	State	Description
Margaret	United Kingdom	The ship foundered in the Atlantic Ocean (46°10′N 22°30′W). Her crew were rescued by Harriet (United Kingdom). Margaret was on a voyage from Liverpool, Lancashire to Newfoundland, British North America.

=== 26 May ===
List of shipwrecks: 26 May 1816
Ship	State	Description
Nerina	United Kingdom	The ship was driven ashore at Wexford. She was on a voyage from Liverpool, Lancashire to Quebec City, British North America. Nerina was later refloated and put into Waterford on 11 June.

=== 30 May ===
List of shipwrecks: 30 May 1816
Ship	State	Description
Duke of Wellington	United Kingdom	The ship was run down and sunk in the North Sea off Cromer, Norfolk. Her crew were rescued. She was on a voyage from South Shields, County Durham to Great Yarmouth, Norfolk.

=== 31 May ===
List of shipwrecks: 31 May 1816
Ship	State	Description
Christina Margaretta	Netherlands	The ship foundered in the North Sea. Her crew were rescued. She was on a voyage from Amsterdam, North Holland to Rouen, Seine-Inférieure, France.

=== Unknown date ===
List of shipwrecks: Unknown date in May 1816
Ship	State	Description
Betsey	United States	The ship was wrecked at "Larenza", Grand Duchy of Tuscany in early May with the loss of all but one of her crew. She was on a voyage from New York to Livorno, Grand Duchy of Tuscany.
Caroline	France	The ship was lost off Martinique. Her crew were rescued. She was on a voyage from Marseille, Bouches-du-Rhône to "Louisiana".
Epervier	France	The ship was driven ashore and wrecked on Sardinia. She was on a voyage from Marseille, Bouches-du-Rhône to Candia, Crete and the Ionian Islands.
Harriet	United States	The ship foundered in the Atlantic Ocean Twenty-three people were rescued by Hannah (United States).
Hawke	United Kingdom	The ship was lost near Tarifa, Spain. She was on a voyage from Smyrna, Ottoman Empire to Liverpool, Lancashire.
James & Mary	United Kingdom	The ship departed from Riga, Russia for Amsterdam, North Holland, Netherlands. No further trace, presumed foundered with the loss of all hands.
Mowbray	United Kingdom	The brig was wrecked at Seaford, Sussex. Her crew were rescued.
Mulgrave Castle	United Kingdom	The ship struck rocks at Boa Vista, Cape Verde, and came into Port Praya, in May. She was on a voyage from London to the Cape of Good Hope.
Rattler	United Kingdom	The ship sank on the South Ham Sand, in the North Sea off Great Yarmouth, Norfolk.
Triumpho	Portugal	The ship ran aground and was damaged on Skagen, Denmark. She was on a voyage from Oporto to Saint Petersburg, Russia. Triumpho was later refloated and put into Copenhagen, Denmark for repairs.
Two Sisters	United Kingdom	The brig was driven ashore and wrecked at Brighton, Sussex.
Waaksamheid	Netherlands	The ship sank in the Seine at Tancarville, Seine Inférieure, France. Her crew were rescued. She was on a voyage from Rotterdam, South Holland to Rouen, Seine-Inférieure.
William and Sally	United Kingdom	The brig was driven ashore at Brighton. She was refloated but was discovered to be so leaky that it was necessary to beach her.
Unnamed	Flag unknown	The brig was driven ashore in the River Plate in late May.

== June ==
=== 2 June ===
List of shipwrecks: 2 June 1816
Ship	State	Description
Vrow Anna	Netherlands	The ship was lost off Hoorn, North Holland. She was on a voyage from Dordrecht, South Holland to Riga, Russia.

=== 4 June ===
List of shipwrecks: 4 June 1816
Ship	State	Description
Apollo	Netherlands	The ship was wrecked on Læsø, Denmark. She was on a voyage from Libava, Courland Governorate to Antwerp.
Jess and Flora	United Kingdom	The ship was driven ashore on Portage Island, in the Saint Lawrence River.

=== 5 June ===
List of shipwrecks: 5 June 1816
Ship	State	Description
Atlas	United Kingdom	The ship was wrecked on the Florida Reef. Her crew were rescued. She was on a voyage from Jamaica to Glasgow, Renfrewshire.
Cossack	United States	The brig was wrecked on the Martyra Reef, in the Gulf of Florida. Her crew were rescued. She was on a voyage from Havana, Cuba to Hamburg.
Iphigenia	Portugal	The ship was wrecked on the Falsterbo Reef, off the coast of Sweden.

=== 6 June ===
List of shipwrecks: 6 June 1816
Ship	State	Description
Fairy	(United Kingdom of Great Britain and Ireland) Bahamas	The sloop was driven ashore at "Key Tahmear".
General Pike	United States	The schooner was wrecked at Sound Point, Bahamas. She was on a voyage from Charleston, South Carolina to Matanzas, Cuba.
La Rosa	Spain	The ship was driven ashore in the Abaco Islands. All on board, more than 300 people, were rescued.
Martha Brae	United Kingdom	The brig was wrecked in the Gulf of Florida near the mouth of the Indian River with the loss of two lives. She was on a voyage from Jamaica to Whitehaven, Cumberland.
Narragauset	United States	The ship was wrecked in the Gulf of Florida. She was on a voyage from Havana to Bristol, Rhode Island.
Zanga	(United Kingdom of Great Britain and Ireland) Bahamas	The schooner was wrecked at Sound Point.
Unnamed	Flag unknown	The brig ran aground on a reef north of Sound Point and sank.
Unnamed	United States	The brig was driven ashore at Sound Point. She was on a voyage from Boston, Massachusetts to Havana.

=== 9 June ===
List of shipwrecks: 9 June 1816
Ship	State	Description
Margaret	United Kingdom	The ship was wrecked on the Haisborough Sands, Norfolk. Her crew were rescued.
Samuel	United Kingdom	The ship foundered in the Atlantic Ocean (41°38′N 16°45′W). She was on a voyage from London to New York, United States. Recovery (United Kingdom) rescued the crew.

=== 10 June ===
List of shipwrecks: 10 June 1816
Ship	State	Description
Aramion	United States	The ship was wrecked at the mouth of the Garonne. She was on a voyage from New York to Bordeaux, Gironde.
Christiana	Norway	The ship was wrecked on Vlieland, Friesland, Netherlands. She was on a voyage from Tønsberg to London, United Kingdom.
Jane	(United Kingdom of Great Britain and Ireland) New South Wales	The sloop foundered off Cape Hawke with the loss of all three crew.
Margaret	United Kingdom	The ship was wrecked on the Haisborough Sands, in the North Sea off the coast of Norfolk.
Orpheus	United Kingdom	The ship foundered in the Gulf of Florida. Her crew were rescued by Competitor (United Kingdom). She was on a voyage from New Orleans, Louisiana to Liverpool, Lancashire.

=== 13 June ===
List of shipwrecks: 13 June 1816
Ship	State	Description
Indian Lass	United Kingdom	The ship was lost near Wexford. She was on a voyage from Maranhão, Brazil to Liverpool, Lancashire.

=== 14 June ===
List of shipwrecks: 14 June 1816
Ship	State	Description
Antonion Teresa de Artanza	Spain	The ship was wrecked at Brest, Finistère, France. Her crew were rescued. She was on a voyage from London, United Kingdom to Bilbao and A Coruña.
Homer	United Kingdom	The ship sprang a leak and was abandoned in the Atlantic Ocean 18 nautical miles (33 km) off Charleston, South Carolina. Her crew were rescued. She was on a voyage from Charleston to Greenock, Renfrewshire.
At least 12 unnamed vessels	Flags unknown	Twelve or fourteen ships were driven ashore at Trinidad da Cuba, Cuba. Some of them were wrecked.

=== 15 June ===
List of shipwrecks: 15 June 1816
Ship	State	Description
St. Anthony	Hamburg	The ship was driven ashore on Texel, North Holland, Netherlands. She was on a voyage from Hamburg to Amsterdam, North Holland.

=== 16 June ===
List of shipwrecks: 16 June 1816
Ship	State	Description
Christina	Duchy of Holstein	The ship was driven ashore on Vlieland, Friesland, Netherlands. She was on a voyage from Tonsberg to London, United Kingdom.
Schwalbe	Duchy of Holstein	The ship was lost off Texel, North Holland, Netherlands. She was on a voyage from Flensburg to St. Croix.

=== 19 June ===
List of shipwrecks: 19 June 1816
Ship	State	Description
Friends	United Kingdom	The ship foundered in the North Sea off the coast of Jutland. Her crew were rescued. She was on a voyage from Glasgow, Renfrewshire to Hamburg.

=== 20 June ===
List of shipwrecks: 20 June 1816
Ship	State	Description
Alderney	United Kingdom	The ship ran aground on the Vogel Sand, in the North Sea. She was on a voyage from London to Hamburg. Alderney was refloated and arrived at Cuxhaven.

=== 24 June ===
List of shipwrecks: 24 June 1816
Ship	State	Description
George	United Kingdom	The ship was wrecked at Brielle, South Holland, Netherlands. All on board were rescued. She was on a voyage from London to Rotterdam, South Holland.

=== 25 June ===
List of shipwrecks: 25 June 1816
Ship	State	Description
Jupiter	Portugal	The foundered off Porto Santo Island, Madeira. Her crew were rescued. She was on a voyage from Lisbon to Madeira.
The Brothers	(United Kingdom of Great Britain and Ireland) New South Wales	The schooner was driven ashore and wrecked in the Kent Group with the loss of a crew member.

=== 26 June ===
List of shipwrecks: 26 June 1816
Ship	State	Description
Ocean	United Kingdom	The ship ran aground in the Scheldt. She was on a voyage from London to Antwerp, Netherlands.

=== 27 June ===
List of shipwrecks: 27 June 1816
Ship	State	Description
Agnetha	Hamburg	The ship foundered in the North Sea off Ameland, Friesland, Netherlands. She was on a voyage from Hamburg to Amsterdam, North Holland, Netherlands.

=== 29 June ===
List of shipwrecks: 29 June 1816
Ship	State	Description
Archduke Charles	United Kingdom	The transport ship foundered off Green Island, British North America with the loss of eight lives. She was on a voyage from Quebec to Halifax, British North America.

=== Unknown date ===
List of shipwrecks: Unknown date in June 1816
Ship	State	Description
Dove	United Kingdom	The ship foundered in the Bristol Channel between Hartland Point, Devon and Lundy Island with the loss of a crew member.
Due Bill	United States	The schooner was wrecked at St. Augustine, East Florida in early June.
Edwin	(United Kingdom of Great Britain and Ireland) New South Wales	The schooner was driven ashore and wrecked near Cape Hawke. All on board survived.
Hannah	United Kingdom	The ship was abandoned at sea. She was towed into Plymouth, Devon, where she sank, by HMS Jasper (Royal Navy). Hannah was on a voyage from London to Quebec City, Lower Canada, British North America. She was subsequently refloated.
Huron	United States	The full-rigged ship was wrecked at St. Augustine in early June.
Imogene	Bremen	The ship was driven ashore on Vlieland, Friesland, Netherlands. She was on a voyage from Bremen to Norfolk, Virginia, United States. She was refloated on 2 July and taken in to Terschelling, Friesland.
Kennedy	United States	The brig was wrecked at St. Augustine in early June. She was on a voyage from Charleston, South Carolina to "St. Mary's".
Messenger	United Kingdom	The ship was wrecked whilst on a voyage from Baltimore, Maryland, United States to Jamaica. Her crew were rescued.
Polperro	United Kingdom	The schooner was driven ashore and wrecked at St Lucar, Spain. Her crew survived.
Providence	United Kingdom	The ship was destroyed by fire in the Mediterranean Sea off the Îles d'Hyères, Var, France. She was on a voyage from Lisbon, Portugal to Marseille, Bouches-du-Rhône, France.
Recovery	(United Kingdom of Great Britain and Ireland) New South Wales	The sloop was wrecked near Port Stephens. All three people on board survived.
Water Witch	United States	The ship .
William	United Kingdom	The brig was wrecked at St. Augustine in early June. She was on a voyage from Charleston to "St. Marys".
Windsor	(United Kingdom of Great Britain and Ireland) New South Wales	The sloop was wrecked on the Long Reef, off the coast of New South Wales.
Unnamed	France	The brig was driven ashore 30 leagues (90 nautical miles (170 km)) south of Punto Piadros, Argentina.

== July ==
=== 2 July ===
List of shipwrecks: 2 July 1816
Ship	State	Description
Arethusa	United Kingdom	The ship was wrecked on St. Paul Island, Nova Scotia, British North America. She was on a voyage from Pictou, Nova Scotia to Liverpool, Lancashire.
Méduse	French Navy	The Pallas-class frigate ran aground on the Arguin Bank, 15 Leagues (45 nautical miles (83 km)) off the coast of Mauritania and broke up slowly. Many survivors were in the ships 6 boats and an improvised 60 foot raft made up of debris tied together carrying a Midshipman, 10 sailors, 147 soldiers, some N.C.O.s and landsmen. The raft was supposed to be towed by the boats but it and the passengers were abandoned by the boats. The boats made it to shore. The Brig Argus rescued the 15 still alive on the raft on 17 July.

=== 8 July ===
List of shipwrecks: 8 July 1816
Ship	State	Description
John and Margaret	United Kingdom	The ship was wrecked at Hythe, Kent.

=== 9 July ===
List of shipwrecks: 9 July 1816
Ship	State	Description
Intrependente	Malta	The ship was abandoned in the Mediterranean Sea off Nice, Alpes-Maritimes, France and subsequently came ashore at Cannes, Alpes-Maritimes. She was on a voyage from Gibraltar to Livorno, Grand Duchy of Tuscany.

=== 10 July ===
List of shipwrecks: 10 July 1816
Ship	State	Description
Magdelaine	France	The brig struck an anchor and sank at Bahia, Brazil. She was on a voyage from Bahia to Havre de Grâce, Seine-Inférieure

=== 11 July ===
List of shipwrecks: 11 July 1816
Ship	State	Description
Ecton	United Kingdom	The ship foundered off The Smalls. Her crew were rescued. She was on a voyage from Liverpool, Lancashire to a Dutch port.

=== 14 July ===
List of shipwrecks: 14 July 1816
Ship	State	Description
Jonge Anthony	Netherlands	The galiot was driven ashore and wrecked near The Lizard, Cornwall, United Kingdom. She was on a voyage from Lisbon, Portugal to Amsterdam, North Holland.
New York Packet	United States	The ship was driven ashore on Dragør, Denmark. She was on a voyage from New York to Saint Petersburg, Russia. New York Packet was later refloated.

=== 17 July ===
List of shipwrecks: 17 July 1816
Ship	State	Description
Prince of Wales	United Kingdom	The schooner was taken in to St. Ives, Cornwall in a sinking condition. She was on a voyage from Waterford to Shoreham-on-Sea, Sussex.
Ross	United Kingdom	The ship ran aground at Halifax, Nova Scotia, British North America. She was on a voyage from London to Halifax.
Waterloo	United Kingdom	The ship was wrecked at Bolderāja, Russia. She was on a voyage from Leith, Lothian to Riga, Russia.

=== 18 July ===
List of shipwrecks: 18 July 1816
Ship	State	Description
John and Margaret	United Kingdom	The ship was wrecked at Hythe, Kent.

=== 19 July ===
List of shipwrecks: 19 July 1816
Ship	State	Description
Jong Bastian	Netherlands	The ship was driven ashore at Hook of Holland, South Holland.

=== 23 July ===
List of shipwrecks: 23 July 1816
Ship	State	Description
Whale	(United Kingdom of Great Britain and Ireland) New South Wales	The sloop departed from Sydney for Hawkesbury. No further trace, presumed foundered with the loss of both crew.

=== 24 July ===
List of shipwrecks: 24 July 1816
Ship	State	Description
Favourite	United Kingdom	The ship foundered in the Atlantic Ocean off Maranhão, Brazil with the loss of all hands. She was on a voyage from Maranhão to London.

=== 25 July ===
List of shipwrecks: 25 July 1816
Ship	State	Description
Brothers	(United Kingdom of Great Britain and Ireland) New South Wales	The schooner was wrecked in the Kent Group. Her crew survived.

=== 27 July ===
List of shipwrecks: 27 July 1816
Ship	State	Description
Jong Jacob	Netherlands	The ship foundered in the North Sea off Egmond aan Zee, North Holland. Her crew were rescued. She was on a voyage from London, United Kingdom to Amsterdam, North Holland.

=== 28 July ===
List of shipwrecks: 28 July 1816
Ship	State	Description
Discovery	India	The ship was driven ashore and wrecked in Table Bay.
HMS Révolutionnaire	Royal Navy	The Seine-class frigate was driven ashore and severely damaged in a storm at Simon's Bay. She was refloated before 5 August. HMS Révolutionnaire was later repaired and returned to service.
Young Phœnix	(United Kingdom of Great Britain and Ireland) Cape Colony	The coaster was driven ashore and wrecked in Table Bay.
HMS Zebra	Royal Navy	The Cruizer-class brig-sloop was severely damaged in a storm in Simon's Bay. She was later repaired and returned to service.

=== 29 July ===
List of shipwrecks: 29 July 1816
Ship	State	Description
Dragon	United Kingdom	The ship ran aground and capsized in the River Lagan. She was on a voyage from Belfast, County Antrim to Norfolk, Virginia, United States.

=== 30 July ===
List of shipwrecks: 30 July 1816
Ship	State	Description
Elizabeth Henrietta	(United Kingdom of Great Britain and Ireland) New South Wales	The brig capsized and sank in the Hunter River with the loss of two of her seven crew.

=== 31 July ===
List of shipwrecks: 31 July 1816
Ship	State	Description
Vrow Fyarda	Netherlands	The ship was lost near Brielle, South Holland. Her crew were rescued. She was on a voyage from Newcastle upon Tyne, Northumberland, United Kingdom to Rotterdam, South Holland.

=== Unknown date ===
List of shipwrecks: Unknown date in July 1816
Ship	State	Description
Adelphi	United States	The ship struck the Brazil Rock and was damaged. She was constquently towed in to Shelburne, Nova Scotia, British North America. Adelphi was on a voyage from New York to Miramichi, New Brunswick, British North America.
Charlotta	Sweden	The ship sprang a leak and foundered. She was on a voyage from Gothenburg to Copenhagen, Denmark.
Daniel	United Kingdom	The ship foundered off Milford, Pembrokeshire on or before 12 July.
Edwin	(United Kingdom of Great Britain and Ireland) New South Wales	The schooner was wrecked at Cape Hawke. All five people on board survived.
Governor Hunter	(United Kingdom of Great Britain and Ireland) New South Wales	The schooner was wrecked 50 nautical miles (93 km) north of Port Stephens.
Hibernia	United Kingdom	The ship was driven ashore in the Holy Loch. Her crew were rescued. She was on a voyage from Gibraltar to the Clyde.
Johanna Sophia	Sweden	The ship sank in Loch Fyne with the loss of all hands. She was on a voyage from Kalmar to Liverpool, Lancashire, United Kingdom.
John	(United Kingdom of Great Britain and Ireland) Jamaica	The shallop was wrecked at Jamaica in early July.
Leipzig	Netherlands	The ship was lost in the White Sea. She was on a voyage from Arkhangelsk, Russia to Amsterdam, North Holland.
Mentor	United Kingdom	The brig was lost near Peniche, Portugal.
Process	United Kingdom	The ship ran aground at Miramichi, New Brunswick, British North America.
William Heathcote	United Kingdom	The ship was wrecked on Bier Island. Her crew were rescued. She was on a voyage from Philadelphia, Pennsylvania to Saint John, New Brunswick. British North America.

== August ==
=== 1 August ===
List of shipwrecks: 1 August 1816
Ship	State	Description
Cornelia	Kingdom of Naples	The ship was lost off Cape de Gat, Spain.

=== 2 August ===
List of shipwrecks: 2 August 1816
Ship	State	Description
Goree	United Kingdom	The ship was wrecked on the Isle of May. She was on a voyage from the Cape Verde Islands, Portugal to London.
Hope and Anchor	United Kingdom	The ship collided with a Portuguese brig. She was towed in to Weymouth, Dorset in a waterlogged condition. She was on a voyage from "East Rice" to Dartmouth, Devon.

=== 3 August ===
List of shipwrecks: 3 August 1816
Ship	State	Description
Margaretta Sophia	Danzig	The ship was driven ashore at Memel whilst on a voyage from Danzig to London, United Kingdom. She was later refloated.

=== 4 August ===
List of shipwrecks: 4 August 1816
Ship	State	Description
Ocean	United Kingdom	The ship was driven ashore at Constantinople, Ottoman Empire. She had been refloated by 10 August.

=== 6 August ===
List of shipwrecks: 6 August 1816
Ship	State	Description
Europa	United Kingdom	The ship ran aground on the Falsterbo Reef, in the Baltic Sea off the coast of Sweden. She was on a voyage from Scarborough, Yorkshire to Saint Petersburg, Russia. Europa was later refloated. She arrived at Copenhagen, Denmark for repairs on 14 August.
Harriet	United States	The ship was wrecked on Sullivan's Island, South Carolina. She was on a voyage from Havana, Cuba to Wilmington, Delaware.

=== 9 August ===
List of shipwrecks: 9 August 1816
Ship	State	Description
Diamond	Spain	The schooner was wrecked on the Cape Romain Shoals, off the coast of South Carolina, United States with the loss of most of her crew of about 50. There were at least seven survivors.
Indefatigable	United Kingdom	The ship was driven ashore at Tralee, County Kerry. She was on a voyage from Bangor, County Down to Tralee.

=== 10 August ===
List of shipwrecks: 10 August 1816
Ship	State	Description
Mary and Susan	United Kingdom	The ship ran ashore at Liverpool, Lancashire. She was on a voyage from Liverpool to Charleston, South Carolina, United States.

=== 15 August ===
List of shipwrecks: 15 August 1816
Ship	State	Description
Argo	United Kingdom	The ship departed from Waterford for Bristol, Gloucestershire. No further trace, presumed foundered in the Irish Sea with the loss of all hands.
Wanskabet	Netherlands	The ship was driven ashore near Brielle, South Holland. She was refloated on 18 August.

=== 17 August ===
List of shipwrecks: 17 August 1816
Ship	State	Description
Mary	United Kingdom	The ship sprang a leak and foundered in the North Sea off Spurn Point, Yorkshire. Her crew survived.

=== 20 August ===
List of shipwrecks: 20 August 1816
Ship	State	Description
Amelia	Hamburg	The ship was driven ashore near Calais, France. She was on a voyage from Hamburg to Livorno, Grand Duchy of Tuscany. Amelia was later refloated and taken in to Calais, where she arrived on 24 August.

=== 21 August ===
List of shipwrecks: 21 August 1816
Ship	State	Description
Mandarin	United States	The ship foundered in the Atlantic Ocean (approximately (43°N 37°W). Eight of her crew were rescued by Ann (United Kingdom). Mandarin was on a voyage from Cádiz, Spain to Wiscasset, Maine.

=== 22 August ===
List of shipwrecks: 22 August 1816
Ship	State	Description
Liberty	United Kingdom	The ship ran aground on the Goodwins Sands, Kent. She was on a voyage from Poole, Dorset to Christiania, Norway. She was refloated with assistance and resumed her voyage.
Robert Walne	United States	The ship was driven ashore and wrecked at Sandy Hook, New Jersey. She was on a voyage from London, United Kingdom to New York.

=== 25 August ===
List of shipwrecks: 25 August 1816
Ship	State	Description
Maria Carling	Bremen	The ship was wrecked on some rocks whilst on a voyage from San Domingo to Bremen. Her crew were rescued by Hobart (United Kingdom).

=== 26 August ===
List of shipwrecks: 26 August 1816
Ship	State	Description
David and Jean	United Kingdom	The ship was severely damaged by fire at Dundee, Forfarshire.

=== 27 August ===
List of shipwrecks: 27 August 1816
Ship	State	Description
William	United Kingdom	The ship struck the Barber Sand, in the North Sea and sank.

=== 28 August ===
List of shipwrecks: 28 August 1816
Ship	State	Description
Caroline	United Kingdom	The ship was lost in the Straits of Malacca. She was on a voyage from Bengal to China.

=== 29 August ===
List of shipwrecks: 29 August 1816
Ship	State	Description
Roberts	United Kingdom	The ship was driven ashore near Liverpool, Lancashire. She was on a voyage from Liverpool to Calcutta, India. She was later refloated and taken in to Liverpool.

=== 30 August ===
List of shipwrecks: 30 August 1816
Ship	State	Description
Fair American	United States	The ship was lost near Batavia, Netherlands East Indies. She was on a voyage from Batavia to Amsterdam, North Holland, Netherlands.
Mary	United States	The ship was wrecked on Heneaga. She was on a voyage from Gonaïves, Haiti to Baltimore, Maryland.
Three Sisters	United States	The ship was wrecked on the Carysfort Reef. Her crew were rescued. She was on a voyage from New York to Louisiana, Missouri Territory.

=== 31 August ===
List of shipwrecks: 31 August 1816
Ship	State	Description
Active	United Kingdom	Captain Walker's ship was driven ashore on the coast of Lincolnshire. Her crew were rescued. She was on a voyage from Newcastle upon Tyne to London.
Active	United Kingdom	Captain Haig's ship was wrecked on the Gunfleet Sand, in the North Sea off the coast of Essex. She was on a voyage from Newcastle upon Tyne to London.
Benjamin	United Kingdom	The ship was driven ashore on the coast of Lincolnshire. Her crew were rescued.
Betty	United Kingdom	The ship was wrecked at Bayonne, Basses-Pyrénées. Her crew were rescued.
Blessing	United Kingdom	The ship was driven ashore on the coast of Lincolnshire.
Busick	United Kingdom	The ship was driven ashore on the coast of Lincolnshire. Her crew were rescued.
Defiance	United Kingdom	The ship was driven ashore on the coast of Lincolnshire. Her crew were rescued.
Duke William	United Kingdom	The ship was driven ashore on the coast of Lincolnshire.
Endeavour	Russia	The ship ran aground off Great Yarmouth, Norfolk and foundered with the loss of all but one of her crew. She was on a voyage from Arkhangelsk to Havre de Grâce, Seine-Inférieure, France.
Fanny	United Kingdom	The ship, homeported in Leeds, Yorkshire, was driven ashore near Cromer, Norfolk.
Fanny	United Kingdom	The ship, homeported in London, was driven ashore near Cromer.
Flying Fish	United Kingdom	The ship was driven ashore on the coast of Lincolnshire. Her crew were rescued.
Friendship	United Kingdom	The sloop foundered in The Wash near King's Lynn, Norfolk. She was later refloated.
Good Hope	United Kingdom	The ship was driven ashore and wrecked on the coast of Lincolnshire.
Hannah	United Kingdom	The ship was driven ashore and wrecked at Sheringham, Norfolk. She was on a voyage from Newcastle upon Tyne to Havre de Grâce, Seine-Inférieure, France.
Hero	United Kingdom	The ship was driven ashore on the coast of Lincolnshire. Her crew were rescued.
Hope	United Kingdom	The ship, homeported at Portsmouth, Hampshire, was driven ashore on the coast of Lincolnshire. Her crew were rescued.
Hope	United Kingdom	The ship, homeported at Sunderland, County Durham, was driven ashore on the coast of Lincolnshire. Her crew were rescued.
Leeds	United Kingdom	The sloop was driven ashore at King's Lynn. She was later refloated.
Margaret and Jane	United Kingdom	The ship was driven ashore near Cromer.
Maria	United Kingdom	The ship was wrecked off Happisburgh, Norfolk with the loss of all hands.
Mary	United Kingdom	The ship was driven ashore near Blakeney, Norfolk. She was on a voyage from London to Leeds, Yorkshire.
Mary Ann	United Kingdom	The ship was driven ashore on the coast of Lincolnshire. Her crew were rescued.
Messenger	United Kingdom	The collier, a brig, was driven ashore at West Runton, Norfolk. Her crew survived.
Oronooco	United Kingdom	The ship was driven ashore and wrecked at Sheringham. Her crew were rescued. She was on a voyage from Ipswich, Suffolk to Newcastle upon Tyne.
Pomona	United Kingdom	The ship was driven ashore at "Sandhale", Lincolnshire. She was later refloated.
Prince of Orange, or Princess of Orange	United Kingdom	The ship was driven ashore and wrecked between Blakeney and Cromer.
Providence	United Kingdom	The ship was driven ashore at Weybourne, Norfolk. She was subsequently refloated and arrived at Scarborough, Yorkshire on 13 September.
Ranger	United Kingdom	The ship was driven ashore and wrecked at Mundesley, Norfolk with the loss of all but one of her crew. She was on a voyage from Newcastle upon Tyne, Northumberland to London.
Rodligheden	Sweden	The ship ran abground on the Heaps Sandbank, in the North Sea off the coast of Essex. She was on a voyage from Gävle to London. She was refloated with assistance and taken in to Harwich, Essex.
Selby	United Kingdom	The ship was driven ashore and wrecked at Sheringham.
Tar	United Kingdom	The ship was driven ashore on the coast of Lincolnshire. She was later refloated and taken to Tetney Haven.
Thais	United Kingdom	The brig was driven ashore at Margate, Kent. She was on a voyage from Sheerness, Kent to Penryn, Cornwall. Thais was refloated on 5 September and taken in to Margate.
Trafficker	United Kingdom	The ship was driven ashore and wrecked between Blakeney and Cromer.
Traveller	United Kingdom	The ship was driven ashore and wrecked between Blakeney and Cromer.
Volunteer	United Kingdom	The sloop foundered in The Wash off the coast of Norfolk with the loss of all on board.
Four unnamed vessels	United Kingdom	The ships were driven ashore at Cromer.
Unnamed	France	The brig was driven ashore at Margate. All on board were rescued.
Unnamed	Flag unknown	The brig foundered off Dieppe, Seine-Inférieure, France. Her crew were rescued.
Unnamed	United Kingdom	The ketch foundered 3 nautical miles (5.6 km) off Mundesley with the loss of all hands.
Unnamed	United Kingdom	The fishing smack was driven ashore 3 nautical miles (5.6 km) north of Mundesley. Her crew were rescued.
Two unnamed vessels	United Kingdom	The sloops wer4e driven ashore on the coast of Lincolnshire.
Unnamed	Netherlands	The ship was wrecked off Walcot Hythe, Norfolk with the loss of all hands.
Ybbaned	United Kingdom	The yacht departed from Ostend, West Flanders, Netherlands for Hythe, Essex. No further trace, presumed foundered with the loss of all on board.

=== Unknown date ===
List of shipwrecks: Unknown date in August 1816
Ship	State	Description
Abeona	United Kingdom	The ship was wrecked on the White Sand, in the North Sea between the mouths of the Elbe and Weser. She was on a voyage from Hamburg to Boston, Lincolnshire.
Cumberland	United Kingdom	The ship was wrecked in the Rabbit Islands, Ottoman Empire. She was on a voyage from Constantinople, Ottoman Empire to Livorno, Grand Duchy of Tuscany.
Four Brothers	(United Kingdom of Great Britain and Ireland) Grenada	The sloop was wrecked on the south coast of Grenada.
Friends	United Kingdom	The ship was wrecked near Arkhangelsk, Russia in late August. Her crew were rescued. She was on a voyage from Arkhangelsk to London.
Harmony	United Kingdom	The ship struck the Whitby Rock and was damaged before 26 August. She put in to Scarborough, Yorkshire. She was subsequently taken in to Sunderland, County Durham for repairs.
Lady Cathcart	United Kingdom	The ship was driven ashore and wrecked in Lough Swilly. She was on a voyage from Londonderry to a Norwegian port.
Mary	United Kingdom	The ship foundered in the Irish Sea off Milford Haven, Pembrokeshire in early August with the loss of all hands. She was on a voyage from Cork to Milford Haven.
Volunteer	United Kingdom	The ship foundered in the North Sea off the coast of Norfolk at the end of August with the loss of all on board.

== September ==
=== 1 September ===
List of shipwrecks: 1 September 1816
Ship	State	Description
Brothers	(United Kingdom of Great Britain and Ireland) British North America	The schooner foundered off Ferryland, Newfoundland. Her crew were rescued.
Clifford	United Kingdom	The ship was wrecked on Anticosti Island, British North America. She was on a voyage from Liverpool, Lancashire to Quebec, British North America.
Endeavour	United Kingdom	The ship was driven ashore at Gravelines, Pas-de-Calais, France. Her crew were rescued.
Helena	United Kingdom	The ship was driven ashore at Wells-next-the-Sea, Norfolk.
Henry	United Kingdom	The ship was driven ashore at Herne Bay, Kent. She was on a voyage from London to New Brunswick, British North America. Henry was later refloated and taken in to The Downs.
Jeannie	United Kingdom	The brig struck the Nayland Rock, in the North Sea off Margate, Kent and was consequently beached. She was on a voyage from London to Dieppe, Seine-Inférieure, France. She was refloated on 10 September and taken in to Margate.
Kisclina	Netherlands	The ship was driven ashore and wrecked at Montreuil, Pas-de-Calais, France with the loss of all but one of those on board.
Leeds	United Kingdom	The ship was driven ashore at Cromer, Norfolk. She was later refloated and taken in to King's Lynn, Norfolk.
Leipsic	United Kingdom	The ship was wrecked on the Burnham Flats, in the North Sea off the coast of Essex. Her crew were rescued. She was on a voyage from Newcastle upon Tyne, Northumberland to London.
Liberty	United Kingdom	The ship was driven ashore near Wells-next-the-Sea. She was on a voyage from Leith, Lothian to London.
Margaret	United Kingdom	The ship foundered in the English Channel off Havre de Grâce, Seine-Inférieure, France. Her crew were rescued. She was on a voyage from Newcastle upon Tyne to Jersey, Channel Islands.
Maria	United Kingdom	The ship was wrecked at Happisburgh, Norfolk with the loss of all hands. She was on a voyage from Newcastle upon Tyne to Great Yarmouth, Norfolk.
Minerva	United Kingdom	The ship foundered in the English Channel off the Isle of Wight. Her crew were rescued. She was on a voyage from Falmouth, Cornwall to London.
Neptune	United Kingdom	The ship was driven ashore at Wells-next-the-Sea. She was later refloated.
Perseverance	United Kingdom	The ship was driven ashore at Wells-next-the-Sea. She was on a voyage from London to Leeds, Yorkshire. Perseverance was later refloated and taken in to Wells-next-the-Sea.
Prince of Orange	United Kingdom	The sloop was driven ashore and wrecked at Cley-next-the-Sea Norfolk with the loss of her captain.
Ranger	United Kingdom	The ship was wrecked near Mundesley, Norfolk with the loss of all but one of her crew. She was on a voyage from Newcastle upon Tyne to London.
Rhodes	United Kingdom	The ship was driven ashore at Wells-next-the-Sea. She was refloated and towed in to Wells-next-the-Sea.
Two Brothers	United Kingdom	The ship was driven ashore at Le Tréport, Seine-Inférieure. She was on a voyage from Rouen, Seine-Inférieure to Rotterdam, South Holland, Netherlands.
Vrouw Heselina	Netherlands	The ship was driven ashore and wrecked at Étaples, Pas-de-Calais, France with the loss of all but one of her crew. She was on a voyage from Havre de Grâce, Seine-Inférieure to Ostend, West Flanders, Netherlands.
Unnamed	United Kingdom	The fishing smack was driven ashore 3 nautical miles (5.6 km) north of Mundesley. Her crew were rescued.
Unnamed	France	The fishing vessel was driven ashore and wrecked on the north French coast.
Unnamed	Russia	The ship was driven ashore at "Oye", Pas-de-Calais with the loss of fourteen of her crew.
Unnamed	United Kingdom	The sloop was driven ashore at Gravelines. Her crew were rescued.

=== 2 September ===
List of shipwrecks: 2 September 1816
Ship	State	Description
August	Netherlands	The ship was driven ashore on Terschelling, Friesland. Her crew were rescued. She was on a voyage from Hamburg to Amsterdam, North Holland.
Britannia	United Kingdom	The ship struck the pier and sank at Ostend, West Flanders, Netherlands with the loss of one life. She was on a voyage from London to Ostend. She was refloated on 8 September and taken in to Ostend.
Vrouw Margaretta	Netherlands	The ship was driven ashore and wrecked at Berck, Pas-de-Calais, France. She was on a voyage from Bordeaux, Gironde, France to Rotterdam, South Holland.
Vrow Trentjie	Netherlands	The ship was driven ashore on Terschelling. Her crew were rescued. She was on a voyage from Hamburg to Amsterdam.
Unnamed	Flag unknown	The ship was wrecked at Cayeux-sur-Mer, Somme, France.

=== 3 September ===
List of shipwrecks: 3 September 1816
Ship	State	Description
Flora	United Kingdom	The ship was wrecked on Cape Rea, Newfoundland, British North America with the loss of a crew member. She was on a voyage from Liverpool, Lancashire to Pictou, Nova Scotia, British North America.
Two Little Sisters	United Kingdom	The ship departed from Demerara for Halifax, Nova Scotia. No further trace, presumed foundered with the loss of all hands.
Unnamed	Denmark	The ship was wrecked near Gravelines, Nord, France with the loss of all but one of her crew.

=== 5 September ===
List of shipwrecks: 5 September 1816
Ship	State	Description
Merchant's Array	United States	The ship was abandoned in the Atlantic Ocean (approximately 44°N 56°W). Her crew were rescued by William and Henry Sweden). She was on a voyage from Gibraltar to Providence, Rhode Island.

=== 8 September ===
List of shipwrecks: 8 September 1816
Ship	State	Description
Belleisle	United Kingdom	The ship was driven ashore at Shoeburyness, Essex.

=== 9 September ===
List of shipwrecks: 9 September 1816
Ship	State	Description
Ceres	United Kingdom	The smack was driven ashore and wrecked at Solva, Pembrokeshire. Her crew were rescued. She was on a voyage from Limerick to Minehead, Somerset.
Charlton	United Kingdom	The ship ran aground on a sandbank off Lowestoft, Suffolk and sank. Her crew were rescued.
Jane	United Kingdom	The ship was driven ashore at Hunterston, Ayrshire. She was on a voyage from Greenock, Renfrewshire to Quebec City, Lower Canada, British North America. Jane was later refloated and put back to Greenock.

=== 10 September ===
List of shipwrecks: 10 September 1816
Ship	State	Description
Ann and Eliza	United Kingdom	The ship was driven ashore between Oporto and Vila do Conde, Portugal. She was on a voyage from London to Oporto.
Augustus	United Kingdom	The sloop was wrecked off Southport, Lancashire. Her cfrew were rescued. She was on a voyage from Poole, Dorset to Liverpool, Lancashire.
George	United Kingdom	The ship was lost near Malin Head, County Donegal with the loss of four of her crew. She was on a voyage from Liverpool, Lancashire to Sligo.
Jupiter	Denmark	The brig foundered in the North Sea off Cuxhaven with the loss of all hands. She was on a voyage from Buenos Aires to Hamburg.
Sutton	United Kingdom	The ship was wrecked off Southport with the loss of nine of the eleven people on board. Survivors were rescued by the Southport Lifeboat. She was on a voyage from Liverpool to Dublin.
William	United Kingdom	The ship ran aground off Kidwelly, Carmarthenshire and was wrecked. All on board were rescued. She was on a voyage from Newfoundland, British North America to Bristol, Gloucestershire.

=== 11 September ===
List of shipwrecks: 11 September 1816
Ship	State	Description
Fos do Douro	Portugal	The ship was driven ashore at Gothenburg, Sweden. She was on a voyage from Oporto to Saint Petersburg, Russia. Fos do Douro was refloated on 28 September and taken in to Gothenburg.
Vrouw Helgandia	Netherlands	The ship foundered in the Baltic Sea. Her crew were rescued. She was on a voyage from Königsberg, Prussia to Amsterdam, North Holland.

=== 12 September ===
List of shipwrecks: 12 September 1816
Ship	State	Description
Duke of Wellington	United Kingdom	The ship was lost whilst on a voyage from Jamaica to Savannah, Georgia, United States.
Mentor	United Kingdom	The ship was abandoned in the Atlantic Ocean. Her crew were rescued by William Bryan (United Kingdom). Mentor was on a voyage from St. Andrews, New Brunswick, British North America to Bristol, Gloucestershire.

=== 13 September ===
List of shipwrecks: 13 September 1816
Ship	State	Description
Alfred	United Kingdom	The ship foundered in the Atlantic Ocean (52°00′N 16°15′W). Her crew survived. She was on a voyage from Liverpool, Lancashire to Bath, Maine, United States.
George	United Kingdom	The galiot was wrecked at Malin, County Donegal with the loss of four of her seven crew. She was on a voyage from Liverpool to Sligo.

=== 14 September ===
List of shipwrecks: 14 September 1816
Ship	State	Description
Fortune	United Kingdom	The ship sprang a leak in the Atlantic Ocean. She was abandoned the next day. Her crew were rescued by Isabella and Euphemia (United Kingdom). Fortune was on a voyage from Dundee, Forfarshire to St. Andrews, New Brunswick, British North America.

=== 15 September ===
List of shipwrecks: 15 September 1816
Ship	State	Description
Alfred	France	The ship, a brig or full-rigged ship, was driven ashore at Guadeloupe.
Commerce	(United Kingdom of Great Britain and Ireland) Barbados	The brig was wrecked at Barbados.
Fortune	United Kingdom	The ship was abandoned in the Atlantic Ocean. Her crew were rescued by Isabella and Euphemia (United Kingdom). She was on a voyage from Stornoway, Isle of Lewis to Quebec, British North America.
Lord Wellington	United Kingdom	The ship was driven ashore on Texel, North Holland, Netherlands.
Lune	United Kingdom	The ship foundered off Dominica.
Mary	(United Kingdom of Great Britain and Ireland) British North America	The ship foundered off Scott's Head, Dominica.
Pancrede	France	The ship was wrecked on Marie-Galante, Guadeloupe.
Pensee	France	The full-rigged ship was driven ashore on Guadeloupe.
Retrieve	United Kingdom	The ship was wreckled at Point Michel, Dominica with the loss of four of her crew.
Stanislaus	France	The ship was wrecked at Martinique. Her crew were rescued.
Volante	Spain	The brig was driven ashore and wrecked at Gunwalloe, Cornwall, United Kingdom. Her crew were rescued. She was on a voyage from Bilbao to Bristol, Gloucestershire, United Kingdom.
HMS Whiting	Royal Navy	HMS Whiting The Baltimore clipper was wrecked on the Doom Bar, at the mouth of the River Camel.

=== 16 September ===
List of shipwrecks: 16 September 1816
Ship	State	Description
Adventure	United Kingdom	The full-rigged ship was wrecked in a hurricane at Martinique.
Apollo	United Kingdom	The ship was wrecked in a hurricane at Martinique.
Economy	(United Kingdom of Great Britain and Ireland) Saint Lucia	The sloop was wrecked at Barbados.
Mary Ann	United Kingdom	The ship was wrecked in a hurricane at Martinique.
Saucy Jack	(United Kingdom of Great Britain and Ireland) Barbados	The schooner was wrecked in a hurricane at Martinique.
Volante	France	The ship was driven ashore at Guadeloupe. She was on a voyage from Bordeaux, Gironde to Guadeloupe.
22 unnamed vessels	France	The ships were wrecked in a hurricane at Martinique.

=== 17 September ===
List of shipwrecks: 17 September 1816
Ship	State	Description
Dorothe Maria	Flag unknown	The ship was discovered capsized and abandoned in the Baltic Sea by a Swedish vessel. She was taken in to Kristiansand, Norway. Dorothe Maria was on a voyage from a Baltic port to Ringkøbing, Denmark.
Galathea	France	The ship was wrecked at Punta de la Atalaya. She was on a voyage from Havre de Grâce to Buenos Aires.
Two Brothers	United States	The ship foundered in the Grand Banks of Newfoundland. Nine of her crew were rescued by William (United Kingdom). She was on a voyage from Philadelphia, Pennsylvania to Amsterdam, North Holland, Netherlands.

=== 18 September ===
List of shipwrecks: 18 September 1816
Ship	State	Description
Brilliant	Denmark	The ship was wrecked on the Long Sand, in the North Sea. Her crew were rescued. She was on a voyage from Bornholm to Bilbao, Spain.

=== 19 September ===
List of shipwrecks: 19 September 1816
Ship	State	Description
Hero	United Kingdom	The ship was wrecked on Dragør, Denmark. Her crew were rescued. She was on a voyage from Leith, Lothian to Stettin.
Orion	Sweden	The ship foundered in the North Sea off Winterton-on-Sea, Norfolk, United Kingdom. She was on a voyage from Stockholm to L'Orient, Morbihan, France.
Rebecca	United States	The ship was wrecked on the coast of East Florida. She was on a voyage from Cádiz, Spain to Savannah, Georgia.

=== 20 September ===
List of shipwrecks: 20 September 1816
Ship	State	Description
Bee	United Kingdom	The ship was wrecked on the north coast of Cape Breton Island, British North America. Her crew were rescued.

=== 21 September ===
List of shipwrecks: 21 September 1816
Ship	State	Description
Benjamin	United States	The ship was wrecked on Grand Bahama. Hercrew were rescued. She was on a voyage from Boston, Massachusetts to Havana, Cuba.

=== 22 September ===
List of shipwrecks: 22 September 1816
Ship	State	Description
Volante	Spain	The brig was wrecked at Gunwalloe, Cornwall, United Kingdom. Her crew were rescued, She was on a voyage from Bilbao to Bristol, Gloucestershire, United Kingdom.

=== 23 September ===
List of shipwrecks: 23 September 1816
Ship	State	Description
Clara	United Kingdom	The ship foundered off "St. Blas". She was on a voyage from Kingston, Jamaica to the "Indian Coast".
Charlotte	United Kingdom	The ship ran aground in the Saint Lawrence River. She was refloated and put back to Quebec City, Lower Canada, British North America in a leaky condition.
Fair Trader	United States	The ship was wrecked on North Caicos. She was on a voyage from Philadelphia, Pennsylvania to St. Jago, Jamaica.
Georgiana	(United Kingdom of Great Britain and Ireland) Jamaica	The sloop was abandoned 3 leagues (9 nautical miles (17 km) off Sombrero, Anguilla.
William Penn	United States	The ship was driven ashore at Charleston, South Carolina. She was on a voyage from Antwerp, Netherlands to Charleston.

=== 24 September ===
List of shipwrecks: 24 September 1816
Ship	State	Description
Stakesby	United Kingdom	The ship ran aground on the Goodwin Sands, Kent. She was refloated with assistance.

=== 26 September ===
List of shipwrecks: 26 September 1816
Ship	State	Description
Active	United Kingdom	The ship ran aground on the Warden Ledge, off the Isle of Wight. She was on a voyage from London to Oporto, Portugal. She was refloated on 28 September and taken in to Cowes, Isle of Wight.
Bolina	United States	The ship was driven ashore on Boddy's Island, North Carolina. Her crew were rescued. She was on a voyage from New York to Charleston, South Carolina.
Victorine	France	The ship was run down and sunk in the Grand Banks of Newfoundland.

=== 27 September ===
List of shipwrecks: 27 September 1816
Ship	State	Description
Industry	United Kingdom	The ship struck rocks off Land's End, Cornwall and foundered. Her crew were rescued. She was on a voyage from Penzance to Padstow, Cornwall.

=== 28 September ===
List of shipwrecks: 28 September 1816
Ship	State	Description
Aldbro'	United Kingdom	The ship was wrecked on the Bahama Bank. Her crew were rescued. She was on a voyage from British Honduras to London.

=== 29 September ===
List of shipwrecks: 29 September 1816
Ship	State	Description
Catherina	Norway	The ship was driven ashore at Helsingør, Denmark. She was on a voyage from Riga, Russia to Bergen. Catherina was later refloated.
Concordia	Duchy of Holstein	The ship was wrecked at Helsingør. She was on a voyage from Flensburg to Uddevalla, Sweden.
Conjuncturen	Sweden	The ship capsized off Helsingør. She was on a voyage from Carlshamn to Málaga, Spain.
Daniel	Denmark	The ship was driven ashore at Helsingør. She was on a voyage from Copenhagen to a Mediterranean port. Daniel was later refloated.
Diana	Swedish Pomerania	The ship was driven ashore at Helsingør. She was on a voyage from Stralsund to Amsterdam, North Holland, Netherlands. Diana was later refloated.
Emma	United Kingdom	The fishing boat foundered off the coast of Kent with the loss of all hands. She broke up during salvage attempts.
Eppleworth	United Kingdom	The schooner was wrecked on the Mouse Sand, in the North Sea off Whitstable, Kent with the loss of a crew member. She was on a voyage from Demerara to London.
Halcyon	United Kingdom	The West Indiaman ran aground on the Mouse Sand and consequently sank with the loss of one of her fourteen crew. Survivors were rescued by the lugger Aid (United Kingdom). Halcyon was on a voyage from Jamaica to London.
Industry	United Kingdom	The ship was driven ashore on the "Lutjewaard". She was on a voyage from Liverpool, Lancashire to Harlingen, Friesland, Netherlands.
Lune	United Kingdom	The ship was driven ashore at Holyhead, Anglesey. Her crew were rescued. She was on a voyage from Demerara to Liverpool, Lancashire. Lune was later refloated. She arrived at Liverpool on 14 October.
Mary	United Kingdom	The ship was wrecked at Waterford. Her crew were rescued. She was on a voyage from Ayr to Cork.
New St. Patrick	United Kingdom	The ship was driven ashore and wrecked in Tramore Bay. All on board were rescued. She was on a voyage from Cork to Dublin.
Regent	United Kingdom	The ship foundered in the North Sea between Aldeburgh and Southwold, Suffolk. Her crew were rescued. She was on a voyage from Boston, Lincolnshire to Weymouth, Dorset.
Rose	United Kingdom	The ship was wrecked at Whitehaven, Cumberland. Her crew were rescued. She was on a voyage from Dublin to Whitehaven.
Severn	United Kingdom	The ship was driven ashore at Arundel, Sussex.
Thomas	United Kingdom	The schooner ran aground on the Fairness Rock, Margate, Kent. She was on a voyage from Bridgwater, Somerset to London. She was refloated and resumed her voyage.

=== 30 September ===
List of shipwrecks: 30 September 1816
Ship	State	Description
Ann	United Kingdom	The ship was driven ashore at Gothenburg, Sweden. She was on a voyage from Liverpool, Lancashire to Saint Petersburg, Russia. She was later refloated.
Britannia	United Kingdom	The ship was wrecked off Gothenburg. Her crew were rescued. She was on a voyage from Hamburg to Sundsvall, Sweden.
Eliza	United Kingdom	The ship was abandoned in the Atlantic Ocean. She was on a voyage from Jamaica to Philadelphia, Pennsylvania, United States.
Emanuel	Sweden	The ship was wrecked near Gothenburg. She was on a voyage from Terravecchia, Kingdom of Sicily.
Patrioten	Sweden	The ship was driven ashore in the Göta älv at Gothenburg. She was on a voyage from Sundsvall to London, United Kingdom.
Rose	United Kingdom	The ship was lost at Whitehaven, Cumberland. She was on a voyage from Dublin to Whitehaven.
Thomas	United Kingdom	The ship foundered in the North Sea off "Demlington". Her crew were rescued by a fishing smack. She was on a voyage from London to Perth, Forfarshire.

=== Unknown date ===
List of shipwrecks: Unknown date in September 1816
Ship	State	Description
Barbara Gertruyda	Netherlands	The ship foundered whilst on a voyage from Bordeaux, Gironde, France to Rotterdam, South Holland. Her crew were rescued.
Carbara	Netherlands	The ship foundered whilst on a voyage from Bordeaux, Gironde, France to Rotterdam, South Holland.
Esk	United Kingdom	The ship ran aground on the Trindala Rock, in the Baltic Sea and was abandoned. She later floated off and was taken in to Klasholm, Sweden by some fishermen. Esk was on a voyage from London to Memel, Prussia
Francis	United States	The ship was driven ashore at Almería, Spain.
Jane	United Kingdom	The sloop was wrecked on the East Hoyle Sandbank in Liverpool Bay. Her crew were rescued by a lifeboat. She was on a voyage from Dublin to Chester, Cheshire.
Lady Elliot	India	The ship departed Sydney, New South Wales for Batavia, Netherlands East Indies. She was subsequently wrecked North of Cardwell, New South Wales (now Queensland).
Nadesha	Russia	The ship sprang a leak and was beached on Götaland, Sweden. She was on a voyage from Jersey, Channel Islands to Saint Petersburg.
Two Brothers	United Kingdom	The sloop was wrecked on the Nore, in the Thames Estuary. She was on a voyage from Manningtree, Essex to London.
Udney	United Kingdom	The ship ran aground at Rangoon, Kongbaung dynasty and was severely damaged before 30 September. She was refloated.
Vrow Hendrika	Netherlands	The ship was lost off the coast of Ireland. Her crew were rescued. She was on a voyage from Amsterdam, North Holland to Newcastle upon Tyne, Northumberland, United Kingdom.
Wanderer	United Kingdom	The ship struck a rock and sank at "Bona Vista". She was on a voyage from Gibraltar to Mogadore, Morocco.

== October ==
=== 1 October ===
List of shipwrecks: 1 October 1816
Ship	State	Description
Apparancen	Sweden	The ship struck a rock and foundered off Gothenburg. Her crew were rescued. She was on a voyage from London, United Kingdom to Gothenburg.
Fortitude	United Kingdom	The ship was wrecked on the Horse Sand, in the North Sea off Reculver, Kent. She was on a voyage from Grenada to London.
Hope	United Kingdom	The ship was driven ashore near Padstow, Cornwall. She was on a voyage from Liverpool, Lancashire to Ostend, West Flanders, Netherlands.
St. Antoine	France	The brig was wrecked on the Spanish coast. She was on a voyage from Marseille, Bouches-du-Rhône to Liverpool.

=== 2 October ===
List of shipwrecks: 2 October 1816
Ship	State	Description
Jane	United Kingdom	The ship was driven ashore at Brielle, South Holland, Netherlands. Her crew were rescued. She was on a voyage from Aberdeen to Rotterdam, South Holland.
Samoset	United Kingdom	The ship ran aground on the East Burrows Sand, in the North Sea off the coast of Essex. She was on a voyage from Wilmington, Delaware to London. She was refloated and taken in to Harwich, Essex.
Tjalk	Netherlands	The ship was driven ashore at Hook of Holland, South Holland.

=== 3 October ===
List of shipwrecks: 3 October 1816
Ship	State	Description
Lancaster	(United Kingdom of Great Britain and Ireland) Grenada	The ship capsized in a squall. Her crew were rescued. She was on a voyage from Norfolk, Virginia to Grenada.
Triton	United Kingdom	The ship was wrecked on the Kentish Knock, in the North Sea. Her crew were rescued. She was on a voyage from Newcastle upon Tyne, Northumberland to Exeter, Devon.

=== 4 October ===
List of shipwrecks: 4 October 1816
Ship	State	Description
Tseres (Церес, 'Ceres')	Imperial Russian Navy	The transport ship was driven ashore and wrecked on the northwestern end of Kihnu in the Gulf of Riga. Her crew were rescued. She was on a voyage from Riga to Kronstadt

=== 5 October ===
List of shipwrecks: 5 October 1816
Ship	State	Description
Eleonora	Netherlands	The ship was wrecked at Baltic Port, Russia. She was on a voyage from Reval, Russia to Amsterdam, North Holland.

=== 6 October ===
List of shipwrecks: 6 October 1816
Ship	State	Description
Clyde	United Kingdom	The sloop ran aground and was severely damaged. She was on a voyage from Grenada to Tobago. She was refloated and put back to Grenada.
Unnamed	Flag unknown	The brig foundered in Dublin Bay with the loss of all hands.

=== 7 October ===
List of shipwrecks: 7 October 1816
Ship	State	Description
George	United States	The ship was abandoned in the Atlantic Ocean (38°40′N 71°20′W). Her crew survived. She was on a voyage from Lübeck to Salem, Massachusetts.

=== 8 October ===
List of shipwrecks: 8 October 1816
Ship	State	Description
Anna	United Kingdom	The ship was driven ashore and wrecked at Gulholmer, Sweden.
Lord Carrington	United Kingdom	The full-rigged ship was lost at Flatholmen, off Marstrand, Sweden with the loss of all hands.
Norden	Sweden	The ship was driven ashore and wrecked at Marstrand. Six of her crew were rescued.
Vrow Alida	Netherlands	The ship foundered in the English Channel. Her crew survived. She was on a voyage from Ghent, East Flanders to Bilbao, Spain.
Unnamed	Sweden	The schooner was driven ashore on Gullholmen.
Unnamed	Norway	The sloop was lost near Marstrand with the loss of five of her crew.

=== 9 October ===
List of shipwrecks: 9 October 1816
Ship	State	Description
Jozé and María	Portugal	The ship was wrecked on the Île de Batz, Finistère, France. She was on a voyage from Pärnu, Russia to Oporto.

=== 10 October ===
List of shipwrecks: 10 October 1816
Ship	State	Description
Barbadoes	United Kingdom	The ship was wrecked in the Isles of Scilly with the loss of sixteen of her seventeen crew. The survivor was rescued by a French vessel. She was on a voyage from Smyrna, Russia to London.

=== 16 October ===
List of shipwrecks: 16 October 1816
Ship	State	Description
Beamish	United Kingdom	The ship was driven ashore and damaged in the Bosphorus. She was on a voyage from Odesa, Russia to Livorno, Grand Duchy of Tuscany. Beamish was later refloated.
George	United States	The ship was lost off New London, Connecticut. She was on a voyage from New London to Grenada.

=== 17 October ===
List of shipwrecks: 17 October 1816
Ship	State	Description
Greek	United Kingdom	The ship was wrecked on Cape Breton Island, Nova Scotia, British North America. She was on a voyage from London to Quebec City, Lower Canada, British North America.
William and Mary	United States	The ship was wrecked in the Abaco Islands. She was on a voyage from Philadelphia, Pennsylvania to New Orleans, Louisiana.
Zorg en Vlyt	Netherlands	The ship departed from Gravesend, Kent, United Kingdom for Rotterdam, South Holland. No further trace, presumed foundered in the North Sea with the loss of all hands.

=== 19 October ===
List of shipwrecks: 19 October 1816
Ship	State	Description
Rebecca	United States	The ship was wrecked on the coast of East Florida, New Spain. She was on a voyage from Cádiz, Spain to Savannah, Georgia.
Sir John Sherbroke	United Kingdom	The ship was wrecked on a reef off Dry Tortuga. Her crew were rescued. She was on a voyage from Jamaica to New York.
Wilhelmina Henrietta	Netherlands	The ship was driven ashore and wrecked on Düne. Her crew survived. She was on a voyage from Memel, Prussia to Amsterdam, North Holland.

=== 20 October ===
List of shipwrecks: 20 October 1816
Ship	State	Description
Brilliant	United Kingdom	The sloop was lost near Noordwijk, North Holland, Netherlands with the loss of all hands. She was on a voyage from Naples to Galipoly, Ottoman Empire and Amsterdam, North Holland.
Busen	United Kingdom	The ship ran aground off Calais, France. She was on a voyage from Málaga, Spain to Amsterdam. Busen was later refloated and taken in to Calais.
Dove	United Kingdom	The ship was wrecked near Peel, Isle of Man. Her crew were rescued. She was on a voyage from Dublin to Belfast, County Antrim.
Duke of Wellington	United Kingdom	The ship was wrecked at Amelia Island, East Florida. Her crew were rescued. She was on a voyage from Jamaica to Savannah, Georgia, United States.
Hoffnung	Flag unknown	The ship was wrecked on Eierland, North Holland. She was on a voyage from St. Ubes, Portugal to Pärnu, Russia.
Marianne D'Anvers	Netherlands	The ship was driven agains the quayside at Antwerp and severely damaged.
Speculator	United Kingdom	The ship was driven ashore and wrecked between Matosinhos and Vila do Conde, Portugal. Her crew were rescued. She was on a voyage from Newfoundland, British North America to Oporto, Portugal.

=== 21 October ===
List of shipwrecks: 21 October 1816
Ship	State	Description
Jupiter	Norway	The ship was wrecked near Kirkwall, Orkney Islands, United Kingdom. She was on a voyage from Trondheim to Belfast, County Antrim, United Kingdom.
Marianne D'Anvers	Netherlands	The ship was driven against the quayside and severely damaged in a storm at Antwerp.
Unnamed	Flag unknown	The sloop was driven ashore at "Neordaisk", Netherlands with the loss of all hands.

=== 22 October ===
List of shipwrecks: 22 October 1816
Ship	State	Description
Catherine and Ann	United Kingdom	The ship foundered in the North Sea off Scheveningen, South Holland, Netherlands. Her crew were rescued. She was on a voyage from London to Amsterdam, North Holland, Netherlands.
Demerary	United Kingdom	The ship was lost near Saint John, New Brunswick, British North America. Her crew were rescued. She was on a voyage from Demerara to St. John.
Newland	United Kingdom	The ship was lost on the coast of Jutland. She was on a voyage from Libava, Courland Governorate to Hull, Yorkshire.
Young Arlon	United Kingdom	The ship capsized at Looe, Cornwall.

=== 23 October ===
List of shipwrecks: 23 October 1816
Ship	State	Description
Christina Bower	United Kingdom	The ship was driven ashore at Calais, France. She was on a voyage from Amsterdam, North Holland, Netherlands to Bordeaux, Gironde, France.
Demerara	United Kingdom	The ship was wrecked at Point Lepreau, New Brunswick, British North America. She was on a voyage from Demerara to Saint John, New Brunswick.
Fanny	(United Kingdom of Great Britain and Ireland) Jersey	The ship sprang a leak and was abandoned in the Atlantic Ocean off Cape St. Vincent, Portugal. She was on a voyage from Jersey to Cádiz, Spain.
Flying Fish	United Kingdom	The ship was driven ashore and damaged on Grand Manan Island, New Brunswick, British North America. She was on a voyage from Saint John, New Brunswick to the West Indies. Flying Fish was later refloated and put back to St. John.
Industry	United Kingdom	The brig was abandoned whilst on a voyage from Uleåborg (Oulu), Sweden to Whitby, Yorkshire. She was later towed in to Arrholm, Sweden.

=== 24 October ===
List of shipwrecks: 24 October 1816
Ship	State	Description
HMS Comus	Royal Navy	The Laurel-class post-ship was wrecked off Cape Pine, Newfoundland, British North America. Her 155 crew survived.
Mary	United Kingdom	The ship ran aground on the Fairness Rock, Margate, Kent. She was on a voyage from Danzig to Bristol, Gloucestershire. She was refloated and taken in to Margate in a leaky condition.

=== 25 October ===
List of shipwrecks: 25 October 1816
Ship	State	Description
Hoppet	France	The ship ran aground at the mouth of the Elbe. Her crew were rescued.
Peggy	United Kingdom	The ship was lost near "Sketraw" with the loss of all hands. She was on a voyage from Leith, Lothian to Aberdeen.

=== 26 October ===
List of shipwrecks: 26 October 1816
Ship	State	Description
Betsey	United Kingdom	The ship was run down and sunk off Anholt, Denmark by Vigilant (United Kingdom). Her crew were rescued. She was on a voyage from London to Pillau, Prussia.
Little Sophia	Rostock	The ship was wrecked at Viana do Castelo, Portugal. Her crew were rescued.

=== 27 October ===
List of shipwrecks: 27 October 1816
Ship	State	Description
Exmouth	United Kingdom	The brig was wrecked near Harwich, Essex. Her crew were rescued. She was on a voyage from Aberdeen to Sheerness, Kent.
Little Sophia	Rostock	The ship was lost near Viana, Portugal. Her crew were rescued. She was on a voyage from Wismar to Oporto, Portugal.
Sacra Familia	(United Kingdom of Great Britain and Ireland) Gibraltar	The ship was wrecked near Cette, Hérault, France. She was on a voyage from Málaga, Spain to Genoa, Kingdom of Sardinia.

=== 28 October ===
List of shipwrecks: 28 October 1816
Ship	State	Description
Adventure	United Kingdom	The ship departed Gravesend, Kent for Stralsund, Norway. No further trace, presumed foundered in the North Sea with the loss of all hands.

=== 29 October ===
List of shipwrecks: 29 October 1816
Ship	State	Description
Adelaide	France	The ship foundered in the Mediterranean Sea off Perpignan, Pyrénées-Orientales. She was on a voyage from Marseille, Bouches-du-Rhône to Morlaix, Finistère.
Adolph	Sweden	The ship ran aground on the Haisborough Sands, in the North Sea off the coast of Norfolk, United Kingdom. She was on a voyage from Gothenburgh to Newry, Couty Antrim, United Kingdom. She was refloated with the assistance of two fishing boats and taken in to Grimsby, Lincolnshire, United Kingdom in a severely leaky condition.
Diana	Denmark	The ship was wrecked on the Cross Sand, in the North Sea off Great Yarmouth, Norfolk, with the loss of all hands. She was on a voyage from Copenhagen to Batavia, Netherlands East Indies.

=== 30 October ===
List of shipwrecks: 30 October 1816
Ship	State	Description
Vesta	Russia	The ship foundered off Törnby, Sweden with the loss of all but two of her crew. She was on a voyage from Saint Petersburg to Rotterdam, South Holland, Netherlands.

=== 31 October ===
List of shipwrecks: 31 October 1816
Ship	State	Description
Eliza Constatnia	Sweden	The galiot was driven ashore and wrecked at Dungeness, Kent, United Kingdom. Her crew were rescued. She was on a voyage from Danzig to Lisbon, Portugal.
Jane	United Kingdom	The ship was driven ashore in the River Thames at Cuckold's Point, Middlesex. She was on a voyage from London to Rotterdam, South Holland, Netherlands. She was refloated and put back to London in a waterlogged condition.

=== Unknown date ===
List of shipwrecks: Unknown date in October 1816
Ship	State	Description
Antelope	(United Kingdom of Great Britain and Ireland) Bahamas	The ship was wrecked on Attwood's Key. She was on a voyage from Nassau to Saint Vincent.
Brothers	United Kingdom	The ship was driven ashore and damaged at Eastbourne, Sussex. She was later refloated and taken in to Newhaven, Sussex.
Catherine Ormond	United States	The ship was wrecked on the coast of East Florida, New Spain. She was on a voyage from Havana, Cuba to Savannah, Georgia.
Clyde	United Kingdom	The sloop ran aground on a reef and was severely damaged. She was on a voyage from Grenada to Tobago. Clyde subsequently put back to Grenada on 6 October.
Diana	United Kingdom	The ship was lost off Brielle, South Holland, Netherlands. She was on a voyage from Sunderland, County Durham to Schiedam, South Holland.
Eleanor	United Kingdom	The ship was driven ashore and wrecked near "Baltic Port".
Fortitude	United Kingdom	The ship was wrecked near Helsingfors, Grand Duchy of Finland. She was on a voyage from Saint Petersburg, Russia to Leith, Lothian.
Jacoba Henrietta	Netherlands	The ship was wrecked on Götaland, Sweden. She was on a voyage from Amsterdam, North Holland to Saint Petersburg, Russia.
Nancy	United Kingdom	The ship was driven ashore in Bootle Bay. She was on a voyage from Saint John, New Brunswick, British North America to Liverpool, Lancashire.
Olive	United Kingdom	The ship was driven ashore at Redbay, County Antrim. She was on a voyage from Liverpool to Londonderry.
Osborne	United Kingdom	The ship was wrecked near Kronstadt, Russia. She was on a voyage from London to Saint Petersburg.
Perle	France	The ship was wrecked at Port-de-Bouc, Bouches-du-Rhône. She was on a voyage from Marseille, Bouches-du-Rhône to Valencia, Spain.
Rebecca & Sarah	United Kingdom	The ship foundered in the Gulf of Finland. She was on a voyage from Liverpool to Saint Petersburg.
Sydney	(United Kingdom of Great Britain and Ireland) New South Wales	The ship foundered in the Pacific Ocean. Her crew survived.
Transporten	Sweden	The ship was wrecked on Saaremaa, Russia.
Wisselvalligheid	Netherlands	The ship was wrecked on the coast of Jutland. She was on a voyage from Riga, Russia to Amsterdam.

== November ==
=== 1 November ===
List of shipwrecks: 1 November 1816
Ship	State	Description
Jane	United Kingdom	The ship was driven ashore in the River Thames at Cuckold's Point, Surrey and became waterlogged. She was on a voyage from London to Rotterdam, South Holland, Netherlands.

=== 2 November ===
List of shipwrecks: 2 November 1816
Ship	State	Description
Catherine	United Kingdom	The ship was wrecked on the West Hoyle Sandbank, in Liverpool Bay with the loss of all hands. She was on a voyage from Liverpool, Lancashire to Newry, County Antrim.
Hoop	Netherlands	The ship departed a Norwegian port for Antwerp. No further trace, presumed foundered with the loss of all hands.
Swan	United Kingdom	The brig foundered in the Irish Sea off Holyhead, Anglesey with the loss of nine of the twelve people on board. She was on a voyage from Dublin to Whitehaven, Cumberland.

=== 3 November ===
List of shipwrecks: 3 November 1816
Ship	State	Description
British Hero	United Kingdom	The ship was wrecked on the Diamond Rock of Aracan. All on board were rescued. She was on a voyage from London to Bengal and Madras, India.
Eliza Constantia	Sweden	The galiot was driven ashore and wrecked at Dungeness, Kent, United Kingdom. Her crew were rescued. She was on a voyage from Danzig to Lisbon, Portugal.
Mary Ann	United Kingdom	The ship was driven ashore and wrecked at Liverpool, Lancashire.

=== 4 November ===
List of shipwrecks: 4 November 1816
Ship	State	Description
Diana	United Kingdom	The ship was driven ashore and damaged at Sunderland, County Durham. She was on a voyage from Plymouth, Devon to Sunderland. She was later refloated and taken in to Sunderland
John	United Kingdom	The ship was driven ashore at Tre Fontane, Sicily. She was on a voyage from London to Constantinople, Ottoman Empire.
Nicholas Benjamin	United Kingdom	The ship was driven ashore south of Belem, Portugal. She was later refloated.

=== 5 November ===
List of shipwrecks: 5 November 1816
Ship	State	Description
Branch	United Kingdom	The ship was wrecked on the Stoney Binks, in the North Sea off the coast of County Durham. Her crew were rescued. She was on a voyage from London to Hull, Yorkshire.
HMS Briseis	Royal Navy	The Cherokee-class brig-sloop was wrecked at Point Pedro, Cuba whilst on a voyage from Jamaica to Nassau, Bahamas. Her crew were rescued by USS Boxer (United States Navy).
Concord	United Kingdom	The ship was driven ashore and wrecked in Table Bay, Cape of Good Hope. All on board were rescued.
Frances Charlotte	United Kingdom	The ship was wrecked in the Bay of Bengal off Preparis. There were over 270 survivors. She was on a voyage from Batavia, Netherlands East Indies to Bengal, India.
Nightingale	United Kingdom	The cutter was driven ashore near Peniche, Portugal. Her crew were rescued. She was on a voyage from Ireland to Lisbon, Portugal.
Woodbridge	United Kingdom	The ship was driven ashore and damaged in Table Bay. All on board were rescued. She was refloated in December.
33 unnamed vessels	Portugal	The fishing boats foundered off Lisbon with the loss of more than 100 lives.

=== 6 November ===
List of shipwrecks: 6 November 1816
Ship	State	Description
Flora	United Kingdom	The ship foundered in the Irish Sea off St. Bees Head, Cumberland. She was on a voyage from the Isle of Man to Whitehaven, Cumberland.
Henrietta	United Kingdom	The ship foundered off Terschelling, Friesland, Netherlands. She was on a voyage from Pillau, Russia to Amsterdam, North Holland, Netherlands.

=== 7 November ===
List of shipwrecks: 7 November 1816
Ship	State	Description
St. Jacob	United Kingdom	The ship was wrecked at Bodø, Norway.
Vrow Catherine	Netherlands	The ship was driven ashore at Memel, Prussia.

=== 8 November ===
List of shipwrecks: 8 November 1816
Ship	State	Description
Eagle	United Kingdom	The ship ws wrecked on Montecristo, Grand Duchy of Tuscany. She was on a voyage from Newfoundland, British North America to Livorno, Grand Duchy of Tuscany.
Hoppett	Sweden	The ship was driven ashore at Kloster, Denmark. She was on a voyage from "Trepany" to Bergen, Norway. Hoppett was later refloated and was reported as intending to put into Stavanger, Norway.
Juno	United Kingdom	The brig capsized and sank in the Atlantic Ocean with the loss of 32 of the 33 people on board. The survivor was rescued on 11 November by the brig Jessie (United Kingdom) Juno was on a voyage from New York, United States to Sligo.
North Star	United Kingdom	The ship was driven ashore and damaged at Burton Point, Wigtownshire. She was on a voyage from Carsethorn, Wigtownshire to the Water of Urr.

=== 9 November ===
List of shipwrecks: 9 November 1816
Ship	State	Description
Albuquerque	United Kingdom	The ship departed from Bengal, India for Rio de Janeiro, United Kingdom of Portugal, Brazil and the Algarves. No further trace, presumed foundered with the loss of all hands.
Ann	United Kingdom	The ship was driven ashore near Wolferton, Norfolk. She was on a voyage from Ipswich, Suffolk to King's Lynn, Norfolk.
Carl August	Netherlands	The ship was lost near Ystad, Sweden. She was on a voyage from Saint Petersburg to Antwerp.
Edward	United Kingdom	The ship was driven ashore in the Isles of Scilly. She was later refloated and taken in to St. Mary's.
Helena	United Kingdom	The sloop was wrecked on the Briggs Rocks, in the Irish Sea. Her crew were rescued. She was on a voyage from Greenock, Renfrewshire to Limerick.
Henrietta	United Kingdom	The ship was driven ashore in the Isles of Scilly. She was refloated on 11 November but was subsequently driven ashore again. Henrietta was on a voyage from Swansea, Glamorgan to Rotterdam, South Holland, Netherlands. She was later refloated and taken in to St. Mary's in a severely damaged and waterlogged condition.
John and Agnes	United Kingdom	The sloop foundered in the North Sea off Dunbar, Lothian with the loss of all bar one of her crew. She was on a voyage from Newcastle upon Tyne, Northumberland to Leith, Lothian.
Mary Ann	United Kingdom	The ship was driven ashore at Garston, Lancashire. She was on a voyage from Liverpool, Lancashire to Charleston, South Carolina, United States.
Norfolk	United Kingdom	The brig was driven ashore at Mundesley, Norfolk. Her crew were rescued.
Swan	United Kingdom	The brig was lost in Holyhead Bay with the loss of nine of the twelve people on board. She was on a voyage from Dublin to Whitehaven, Cumberland.
Vine	United Kingdom	The ship struck a rock in Ballywater Bay and was driven ashore. She was on a voyage from London to Belfast, County Antrim.

=== 10 November ===
List of shipwrecks: 10 November 1816
Ship	State	Description
Albertus Adrianus	Netherlands	The ship was driven ashore and wrecked at Scheveningen, South Holland. She was on a voyage from London, United Kingdom to Rotterdam, South Holland.
Brothers	United Kingdom	The brig was driven ashore south of Troon, Ayrshire.
Charming Nancy	(United Kingdom of Great Britain and Ireland) Jersey	The ship departed Saint Petersburg, Russia for Jersey. No further trace, presumed foundered with the loss of all hands.
Christiana	Hamburg	The ship was wrecked near Boulogne, Pas-de-Calais, France. She was on a voyage from Cádiz, Spain to Hamburg.
Cossack	United Kingdom	The brig was driven ashore at Boulogne, Pas-de-Calais, France. She was on a voyage from London to Havana, Cuba. She was refloated on 22 November and taken in to Boulogne.
Eagle	United Kingdom	The ship was wrecked on the Formiques Rocks, in the Tyrrhenian Sea off Montecristo, Kingdom of Sicily. She was on a voyage from Newfoundland, British North America to Livorno, Grand Duchy of Tuscany and Naples, Kingdom of the Two Sicilies.
Harpooner	United Kingdom	The transport ship was wrecked at Cape Pine, Newfoundland, British North America with the loss of 208 of the 385 people on board. She was on a voyage from Quebec City, Lower Canada, British North America to an English port.
Iris	France	The ship was wrecked on the Goodwin Sands, Kent, United Kingdom with the loss of all hands.
Lord Glenorchy	United Kingdom	The ship was wrecked on the Falsterbo Reef, in the Baltic Sea. Her crew survived. She was on a voyage from Danzig to Perth.
Mary Ann	United Kingdom	The ship was driven ashore and severely damaged at Liverpool, Lancashire. She was on a voyage from Liverpool to Charleston, South Carolina, United States.
Unnamed	United Kingdom	The sloop was wrecked near Alnmouth, Northumberland.

=== 11 November ===
List of shipwrecks: 11 November 1816
Ship	State	Description
Active	United Kingdom	The ship was driven ashore at Thorpeness, Suffolk. She was on a voyage from London to Hull, Yorkshire. Active was later refloated and taken in to Harwich, Essex.
Brothers	United Kingdom	The brig was driven ashore at Troon, Ayrshire. She was on a voyage from Dublin to Ayr.
Ceres	United Kingdom	The ship was driven ashore on Texel, North Holland, Netherlands. She was later refloated.
Clyde	United Kingdom	The ship was driven ashore near Cardigan. She was on a voyage from Dublin to Bideford, Devon. She was later refloated and taken in to Cardigan for repairs.
Eliza	United Kingdom	The ship ran aground in Morecambe Bay. She was on a voyage from Glasgow, Renfrewshire to Lancaster, Lancashire.
Friends	United Kingdom	The ship was driven ashore at Liverpool, Lancashire. She was on a voyage from Liverpool to Saint John, New Brunswick, British North America. Friends was later refloated.
Harmony	United Kingdom	The ship was driven ashore and wrecked near Beaumaris, Anglesey. She was on a voyage from Liverpool to Newry, County Antrim.
Harriet	United Kingdom	The ship was driven ashore at St. Ives, Cornwall. She was on a voyage from Quebec City, Lower Canada, British North America to Liverpool. Harriet was refloated on 18 November and taken in to St. Ives for repairs.
Hope	United Kingdom	The ship was driven ashore and wrecked near Beaumaris. She was on a voyage from Liverpool to Newry.
Jane	United Kingdom	The ship was driven ashore at Holyhead, Anglesey.
Jane	United Kingdom	The ship foundered whilst on a voyage from Trinity Bay to St. John's, Newfoundland, British North America.
John	United Kingdom	The ship was driven ashore at Liverpool. She was on a voyage from Dublin to Liverpool. John was later refloated.
Liberty	United Kingdom	The ship sank in the River Mersey. She was on a voyage from Drogheda, County Louth to Liverpool.
Margaret	United Kingdom	The ship foundered in Gardinstone Bay with the loss of all hands. She was on a voyage from Amsterdam, North Holland, Netherlands to Newcastle upon Tyne, Northumberland.
Mary	United Kingdom	The ship capsized and sank in the North Sea off Lowestoft, Suffolk. Her crew were rescued. She was on a voyage from London to Newcastle upon Tyne.
Mary and Dorothy	United Kingdom	The transport ship was driven ashore at Falmouth, Cornwall.
Mary Ann	United Kingdom	The ship was driven ashore at Liverpool. She was on a voyage from Waterford to Liverpool. Although declared beyond economic repair, Mary Ann was later refloated.
Mary Ann	United Kingdom	The ship was wrecked near Lough Swilly. She was on a voyage from Roundstone, County Galway to Dublin.
Mary Fell	United Kingdom	The ship was driven ashore near Cardigan. She was on a voyage from Liverpool to Buenos Aires, Argentina. Mary Fell was refloated on 2 December and taken in to New Quay, Cardiganshire.
Notre Dame des Carmes	Portugal	The ship was wrecked near La Rochelle, Charente-Maritime, France.
Providence	Sweden	The ship was wrecked near Stockholm. Her crew were rescued.
Sarah Adams	United Kingdom	The ship was driven ashore at Liverpool. She was on a voyage from Liverpool to London.
Snake	United Kingdom	The ship was driven ashore and severely damaged at Walmer, Kent whilst on a voyage from Sunderland, County Durham to Guernsey, Channel Islands. She was refloated on 20 November and taken in to Ramsgate, Kent.
HMS Tay	Royal Navy	The Cyrus-class post ship was wrecked in the Alacreanes Islands. She was on a voyage from Campeche, Viceroyalty of New Granada to Jamaica.
William	United Kingdom	The ship was driven ashore at Liverpool. She was on a voyage from Trieste to Liverpool.
William and Henry	United States	The ship was wrecked at La Rochelle, Charente-Maritime, France.

=== 12 November ===
List of shipwrecks: 12 November 1816
Ship	State	Description
Aimwell	United States	The ship was driven ashore at Livorno, Grand Duchy of Tuscany. She was later refloated.
Catherina Helena	Netherlands	The ship was lost near Christiansand, Norway. Her crew were rescued. she was on a voyage from Riga, Russia to Amsterdam, North Holland.
Eliza	United Kingdom	The ship was driven ashore and wrecked at Troon, Ayrshire.
Elizabeth	United Kingdom	The ship ran aground at the mouth of the Scheldt. She was on a voyage from Greenock, Renfrewshire to Antwerp, Netherlands.
Elizabeth	Denmark	The ship was driven ashore and wrecked on the Swedish coast. She was on a voyage from Copenhagen to Gothenburg, Sweden.
Emelia	United States	The ship was driven ashore at Livorno. She was on a voyage from Livorno to Baltimore, Maryland. Emelia was later refloated and taken in to Livorno for repairs.
Liverpool Cossack	United Kingdom	The ship was driven ashore and wrecked at Berck, Pas-de-Calais, France. Her crew survived.
Maria Elizabeth	Denmark	The ship was wrecked on the west coast of Guernsey, Channel Islands. Her crew were rescued. She was on a voyage from Palermo, Spain to Antwerp, Netherlands.

=== 13 November ===
List of shipwrecks: 13 November 1816
Ship	State	Description
Anna Christina	Hamburg	The ship was driven ashore at Pillau, Prussia. She was on a voyage from Pillau to Hamburg. Anna Christina was later refloated and returned to Pillau.
Apollo	United Kingdom	The ship ran aground at Saint-Valery-sur-Somme, Somme, France. She was on a voyage from London to Alicante, Spain.
Catherina Cecilia	Netherlands	The ship was lost near Christiansand, Norway. Her crew were rescued. She was on a voyage from Riga, Russia to Amsterdam, North Holland.
Elise	Sweden	The ship was lost whilst on a voyage from Gothenburg to Landskrona. Her crew were rescued.
Iphigenia	Netherlands	The ship was driven ashore and wrecked at Zandvoort, North Holland. Five of her crew were rescued. She was on a voyage from Surinam to Amsterdam, North Holland.
Jonge Henrich	Sweden	The ship was driven ashore on the coast of Jutland. Her crew were rescued. She was on a voyage from Aberdeen, United Kingdom to Gothenburg.
Margaret and Jane	United Kingdom	The ship was driven ashore in Dalminoch Bay.
Rapid	United Kingdom	The ship was wrecked at Cape Bullard with the loss of all hands. She was on a voyage from Grenada to St. John's, Newfoundland, British North America.
Stranger	United Kingdom	The ship foundered in the Atlantic Ocean off Land's End, Cornwall. She was on a voyage from Newport, Monmouthshire to Waterford. Her crew were rescued by Severn (United Kingdom).
Wilhelmina	Netherlands	The ship was driven ashore at Schiphol, North Holland. She was on a voyage from Gothenburg, Sweden to Amsterdam, North Holland.

=== 14 November ===
List of shipwrecks: 14 November 1816
Ship	State	Description
Amlwch	United Kingdom	The ship was driven ashore at Beaumaris, Anglesey.
Elizabeth	France	The ship was driven ashore at "Peltin". She was on a voyage from Riga, Russia to La Rochelle, Charente-Maritime.
Emulous	United Kingdom	The ship was driven ashore on Ancrun Island. She was on a voyage from London to Hamburg.
Friends	United Kingdom	The ship was driven ashore at Liverpool, Lancashire.
Herstelling	Netherlands	The ship was driven ashore near Petten, North Holland. She was on a voyage from Bristol, Gloucestershire, United Kingdom to Dordrecht, South Holland.
John	United Kingdom	The ship was driven ashore at Liverpool. She was on a voyage from Dublin to Liverpool.
Mary Ann	United Kingdom	The ship was driven ashore and severely damaged at Liverpool. She was on a voyage from Waterford to Liverpool.
Sampson	United Kingdom	The ship was driven ashore at Beverwijk, North Holland, Netherlands. Her crew were rescued. She was on a voyage from Hull, Yorkshire to Antwerp, Netherlands.
Sarah	United Kingdom	The ship was driven ashore at Liverpool.
William	United Kingdom	The ship was driven ashore at Liverpool. She was on a voyage from Dumfries to Liverpool.
William	United Kingdom	The ship was driven ashore at Liverpool. She was on a voyage from Trieste to Liverpool.

=== 15 November ===
List of shipwrecks: 15 November 1816
Ship	State	Description
Beaufort Castle	United Kingdom	The ship sank off Loch Eriboll with the loss of all hands. She was on a voyage from Saint Petersburg, Russia to Dublin.
Doris	United Kingdom	The ship departed from Montevideo, Viceroyalty of the Río de la Plata for Liverpool, Lancashire. She was subsequently wrecked at the mouth of the "St. Francisco River", Brazil.
Elizabeth	United Kingdom	The ship was wrecked at Memel, Prussia. She was on a voyage from Saint Petersburg to Leith, Lothian.
Jonge Frederick	Netherlands	The ship was wrecked at Callantsoog, North Holland with the loss of all hands. She was on a voyage from Riga, Russia to the Maas.

=== 16 November ===
List of shipwrecks: 16 November 1816
Ship	State	Description
Aline	Prussia	The ship foundered in the Baltic Sea off Læsø, Denmark. Her crew were rescued. She was on a voyage from Pillau to London, United Kingdom.
HMS Bermuda	Royal Navy	The brig-sloop was wrecked whilst on a voyage from the Gulf of Florida to Jamaica with the loss of a crew member.
Constitution	Sweden	The ship was driven ashore on Eierland, North Holland, Netherlands. She was on a voyage from Stockholm to Lisbon, Portugal.
Denhickes	(Ottoman Empire) Egypt	The ship was driven ashore at Livorno, Grand Duchy of Tuscany.
Intrepid	United Kingdom	The ship ran aground on the Hoyle Sandbank, in Liverpool Bay. She was on a voyage from Miramichi Bay to Liverpool, Lancashire. She was later refloated and taken in to Bootle Bay.
Maria	Russia	The ship was driven ashore at Livorno.
Maria	Spain	The ship was driven ashore at Livorno.
Probita	(Ottoman Empire) Egypt	The ship was driven ashore at Livorno.
Standard	United Kingdom	The ship was wrecked on Anholt, Denmark. Her crew were rescued. She was on a voyage from Newcastle upon Tyne, Northumberland to Copenhagen, Denmark.
St. Nicolay	Russia	The ship departed from Kronstadt for Amsterdam, North Holland. No further trace, presumed foundered with the loss of all hands.
Themistolce	United Kingdom	The ship was driven ashore at Livorno.

=== 17 November ===
List of shipwrecks: 17 November 1816
Ship	State	Description
Adventure	United Kingdom	The ship was driven ashore near Filey, Yorkshire. She was on a voyage from Sunderland, County Durham to Scarborough, Yorkshire. She was later refloated and taken in to Scarborough.
Cunningham Boyle	United Kingdom	The ship sprang a leak and was beached at Calais, France. She was on a voyage from St. Thomas, Virgin Islands to Bremen. Cunningham Boyle was refloated on 16 November and taken in to Calais.
Frederica Hendrica	Netherlands	The ship was driven ashore and wrecked on Götaland, Sweden. Her crew were rescued. She was on a voyage from Riga, Russia to Rotterdam, South Holland.
Rover	United Kingdom	The ship foundered in the Bristol Channel between Hartland Point and Lundy Island, Devon. Her crew were rescued. She was on a voyage from Newport, Monmouthshire to London.
Virginie	France	The ship was driven ashore at Calais. She was on a voyage from Arkhangelsk, Russia to Havre de Grâce, Seine-Inférieure.

=== 18 November ===
List of shipwrecks: 18 November 1816
Ship	State	Description
Alfred	United Kingdom	The brig was driven ashore and wrecked at Newhaven, Sussex. Her crew were rescued.
Isabell	United Kingdom	The ship departed from Jamaica for Liverpool, Lancashire. No further trace, presumed foundered with the loss of all hands.
Neptune	United Kingdom	The ship foundered in the Baltic Sea off Ystad, Sweden. Her crew were rescued. She was on a voyage from Stockholm, Sweden to Hull, Yorkshire.
Thomas and Ann	United Kingdom	The ship was driven ashore and severely damaged at Brighton, Sussex. She was refloated on 21 November and taken in to Shoreham-by-Sea, Sussex.

=== 19 November ===
List of shipwrecks: 19 November 1816
Ship	State	Description
Charming Nancy	United Kingdom	The ship departed from Saint Petersburg, Russia for Jersey, Channel Islands. No further trace, presumed foundered with the loss of all hands.
Louise	United Kingdom	The ship was driven ashore near Lübeck. She was on a voyage from London to Lübeck, Wismar and Rostock.
Sir Henry Mildmay	United Kingdom	The ship was driven ashore at Danzig. She was on a voyage from Danzig to Leith, Lothian.
Swift	United Kingdom	The ship was driven ashore at Liverpool, Lancashire. She was on a voyage from Belfast, County Antrim to Liverpool.

=== 20 November ===
List of shipwrecks: 20 November 1816
Ship	State	Description
Fortuna	Netherlands	The ship ran aground near Kragerø, Norway. She was on a voyage from Strömstad, Sweden to Amsterdam, North Holland.
Industry	United Kingdom	The ship was driven ashore on "Stiffens Klint". She was on a voyage from Málaga, Spain to Saint Petersburg, Russia. Industry was later refloated and put into Copenhagen, Denmark for repairs.
Sterling	United Kingdom	The ship was wrecked in the Seal Rocks, in the St. Lawrence River. She was on a voyage from Quebec City, Lower Canada, British North America to London.
Zephyr	United Kingdom	The ship was driven ashore near Pillau, Prussia.

=== 21 November ===
List of shipwrecks: 21 November 1816
Ship	State	Description
Bellona	United Kingdom	The ship was sighted off the Virginia Capes, United States whilst on a voyage from British Honduras to London. No further trace, presumed foundered in the Atlantic Ocean with the loss of all hands.
Braddock	United Kingdom	The ship was driven ashore at the Nole, near Savannah, Georgia, United States. She was on a voyage from Liverpool, Lancashire to Savannah.
Paroquet	United Kingdom	The ship was wrecked at Strangford, County Antrim. She was on a voyage from Liverpool to the West Indies.

=== 22 November ===
List of shipwrecks: 22 November 1816
Ship	State	Description
Elizabeth	United Kingdom	The ship capsized in a squall off Penlee Point, Cornwall. She was later taken in to St. Ives, Cornwall.
Hibernia	United Kingdom	The ship foundered in the Atlantic Ocean. Her crew were rescued by Barossa (United Kingdom). Hibernia was on a voyage from the Azores to Madeira.
Jane	Spain	The ship was last sighted on this date whilst on a voyage from Newfoundland, British North America to Bilbao. Presumed subsequently foundered with the loss of all hands.
Oliborn	Norway	The ship ran aground at Ostend, West Flanders, Netherlands. She was on a voyage from a Norwegian port to Guernsey, Channel Islands.

=== 23 November ===
List of shipwrecks: 23 November 1816
Ship	State	Description
Adamant	United Kingdom	The ship was severely damaged by ice near Bremen.
Betsey Cains	United Kingdom	The ship was driven ashore and damaged at South Shields, County Durham.
Carl	Hamburg	The ship was wrecked on the Kentish Knock, in the North Sea. Her crew were rescued. She was on a voyage from Hamburg to St. Domingo.
George	United Kingdom	The ship was severely damaged by ice near Bremen.
Henrietta	Danzig	The ship was driven ashore near Ystad, Sweden. She was on a voyage from Danzig to Leith, Lothian, United Kingdom.
Lord Donegall	United Kingdom	The ship foundered in the Irish Sea off Holyhead, Anglesey. Her crew were rescued. She was on a voyage from Whitehaven, Cumberland to Cork.
Prince of Wales	United Kingdom	The ship ran aground on the Stoney Binks, in the North Sea off the coast of County Durham and was damaged. She was on a voyage from South Shields to London. Prince of Wales was refloated and put into Hull, Yorkshire.

=== 24 November ===
List of shipwrecks: 24 November 1816
Ship	State	Description
Correio da Asia	Portugal	The ship was wrecked on the west coast of New Holland. Her crew survived. She was on a voyage from Lisbon to China.
St. Antonine	France	The barque sank at Honfleur, Calvados.

=== 25 November ===
List of shipwrecks: 25 November 1816
Ship	State	Description
Charming Nancy	United Kingdom	The ship departed from Waterford bound for Liverpool, Lancashire. No further trace, presumed foundered in the Irish Sea with the loss of all hands.
Cornelia Hester	United Kingdom	The ship was driven ashore and wrecked on Ruhnu, Russia. Her crew were rescued. She was on a voyage from Riga, Russia to Brest, Finistère, France.
Diana	United Kingdom	The ship departed from Waterford for London. Presumed subsequently foundered off Penzance, Cornwall with the loss of all hands.
Frau Engel	Norway	The ship foundered off the mouth of the Eider. She was on a voyage from Newcastle upon Tyne, Northumberland, United Kingdom to Fredrikstad.
Henrietta	Danzig	The ship ran aground near Ystad, Sweden. She was on a voyage from Danzig to Leith, Lothian, United Kingdom.
Patriot	United Kingdom	The ship was driven ashore and wrecked on Ruhnu. Her crew were rescued. She was on a voyage from Riga to Dundee, Forfarshire.
Thomas	United Kingdom	The ship was driven ashore and wrecked on Ruhnu. Her crew were rescued. She was on a voyage from Riga to Hull, Yorkshire.

=== 27 November ===
List of shipwrecks: 27 November 1816
Ship	State	Description
Mary	United Kingdom	The ship foundered in the Atlantic Ocean off Tory Island, County Donegal. Her crew were rescued. She was on a voyage from Limerick to London.

=== 28 November ===
List of shipwrecks: 28 November 1816
Ship	State	Description
Isabella	United Kingdom	The ship was wrecked on the Haak Sand, in the North Sea off the Dutch coast. Her crew were rescued. She was on a voyage from London to Hamburg.
Nancy	United Kingdom	The ship was off the Orkney Islands whilst on a voyage from Saint Petersburg, Russia to Liverpool, Lancashire. No further trace, presumed foundered with the loss of all hands.
Patrioten	Sweden	The ship was wrecked at Zierikzee, Zeeland, Netherlands. Her crew were rescued. She was on a voyage from Sundsvall to London.
Shannon	United Kingdom	The ship was driven ashore and wrecked at Southport, Lancashire. She was on a voyage from Limerick to Liverpool.

=== 29 November ===
List of shipwrecks: 29 November 1816
Ship	State	Description
Lively	(United Kingdom of Great Britain and Ireland) British North America	The ship was wrecked near "La Haye". She was on a voyage from Yarmouth, Nova Scotia to Halifax, Nova Scotia.

=== 30 November ===
List of shipwrecks: 30 November 1816
Ship	State	Description
Charles	United Kingdom	The ship ran aground at Brielle, South Holland, Netherlands. She was refloated on 2 December.
Fortuna	Netherlands	The ship was driven ashore and wrecked near Egmond aan Zee, North Holland. She was on a voyage from Rouen, Seine-Inférieure, France to Amsterdam, North Holland.
Helen	United Kingdom	The ship ran aground on the Herd Sand, in the North Sea. Her crew were rescued by a lifeboat. She was on a voyage from Glasgow, Renfrewshire to Newcastle upon Tyne, Northumberland. Helen was refloated on 2 December at taken in to South Shields, County Durham for repairs.
Penrhyn Castle	United Kingdom	The ship was driven ashore on Birker Island, Russia. She was on a voyage from London to Pillau, Prussia. She was refloated on 19 December and taken in to Pillau.

=== Unknown date ===
List of shipwrecks: Unknown date in November 1816
Ship	State	Description
America	United Kingdom	The ship was driven ashore on Saltholm, Denmark before 9 November. She was on a voyage from London to Pori, Finland.
Andromeda	United Kingdom	The ship foundered in the Irish Sea with the loss of all hands at the end of November. She was on a voyage from the Clyde to Londonderry.
Ann	United Kingdom	The ship was driven ashore at Wolferton, Norfolk. Her crew were rescued. She was on a voyage from Ipswich, Suffolk to King's Lynn, Norfolk.
Britannia	United Kingdom	The ship was wrecked on the coast of Newfoundland, British North America. Her crew were rescued. She was on a voyage from Quebec, British North America to the Clyde.
Concord	United Kingdom	The ship was driven ashore at Marske-by-Sea, Yorkshire. She was on a voyage from Amsterdam, North Holland, Netherlands to Liverpool, Lancashire.
Countess of Loudoun	United Kingdom	The ship wrecked off Palawan in early November. Crew saved by Susan United Kingdom.
David	United Kingdom	The ship ran aground and sank at Calais, France. She was on a voyage from Memel, Prussia to Cowes, Isle of Wight.
Diana	United Kingdom	The ship was wrecked on "Cross Island", Russia. Her crew were rescued.
Grant	United Kingdom	The ship ran aground on Neuwark. She was on a voyage from Sunderland, County Durham to Hamburg. Grant was later refloated.
Hannah Charlotte	Netherlands	The ship foundered in the Baltic Sea off Turku, Grand Duchy of Finland. She was on a voyage from Antwerp to Vaasa, Grand Duchy of Finland.
Hercules	United Kingdom	The ship departed from Richibucto, New Brunswick, British North America for Hull, Yorkshire. No further trace, presumed foundered with the loss of all hands.
Hibernia	United Kingdom	The sloop was abandoned in the Atlantic Ocean 20 leagues (60 nautical miles (110 km) off Terceira Island. Azores before 1 December.
Industry	United Kingdom	The ship was lost in the Baltic Sea. Her crew were rescued.
Intrepid	United Kingdom	The ship was driven ashore near Mockbeggar, Cheshire. She was on a voyage from Miramichi, New Brunswick, British North America to Liverpool, Lancashire. She was later refloated and taken in to Bootle Bay.
Jane & Emma	United Kingdom	The ship departed from Patras, Greece for Liverpool in early November. No further trace, presumed foundered with the loss of all hands.
Johannes	Russia	The ship was wrecked on the Pomeranian coast. She was on a voyage from Pillau, Prussia to Stettin, Prussia.
Mary	United Kingdom	The ship foundered whilst on a voyage from Harlingen, Friesland, to Texel, North Holland. Her crew were rescued.
Mary	United Kingdom	The ship was driven ashore at Worthing, Sussex. She was on refloated on 22 November and taken in to Littlehampton, Sussex.
Perle	France	The ship was lost near Bône, Algeria. She was on a voyage from Marseille, Bouches-du-Rhône to Barcelona and Valencia, Spain.
Perseverance	United Kingdom	The ship was driven ashore and wrecked on Goose Island, Quebec in late November.
Po	United Kingdom	The ship foundered in the English Channel off Calai, France with the loss of all seven of her crew.
Rebecca	United Kingdom	The ship was wrecked on the coast of Newfoundland with the loss of all but one of her crew. She was on a voyage from Quebec to a Mediterranean port.
Sidney	United Kingdom	The packet ship foundered. Her crew were rescued. She was on a voyage from New South Wales to London.
St. Matwey	Russia	The ship was driven ashore on Birker Island. She was on a voyage from Saint Petersburg to Oporto and Lisbon, Portugal.
Sydney	(United Kingdom of Great Britain and Ireland) New South Wales	The ship foundered in the Pacific Ocean. Her crew were rescued. She was on a voyage from New South Wales to London.
Tyson	United Kingdom	The ship foundered in the Irish Sea off Holyhead, Anglesey. Her crew were rescued.
Union	United Kingdom	The ship capsized in the Irish Sea before 9 November. She was on a voyage from Cork to Belfast, County Antrim. Union was later towed in to Bull Bay Creek, Anglesey.
Two unnamed vessels	Flags unknown	The ships were lost in the Black Sea.

== December ==
=== 1 December ===
List of shipwrecks: 1 December 1816
Ship	State	Description
Carl August	Denmark	The ship was driven ashore near Engelholm, Sweden. She was on a voyage from St. Thomas, Virgin Islands to Copenhagen.
Enigheden	Norway	The ship was driven ashore and wrecked near Stavanger. She was on a voyage from Newcastle upon Tyne, Northumberland, United Kingdom to Molde.
Hibernia	United Kingdom	The sloop was discovered abandoned 20 leagues (60 nautical miles (110 km) off Terceira Island, Azores.

=== 2 December ===
List of shipwrecks: 3 December 1816
Ship	State	Description
Unnamed	United Kingdom	The ship foundered off Cephalonia, Greece with the loss of all hands.

=== 3 December ===
List of shipwrecks: 3 December 1816
Ship	State	Description
Carl	Russia	The ship was wrecked near Stralsund, Swedish Pomerania.
Fairy	United Kingdom	The ship was driven ashore at Lund, Uist, Outer Hebrides. She was refloated in July 1819 and taken in to Dundee, Forfarshire.
George	United Kingdom	The ship was wrecked on Cable Island with the loss of all hands. She was on a voyage from Ayr to Cork.

=== 5 December ===
List of shipwrecks: 5 December 1816
Ship	State	Description
Flora	United Kingdom	The ship struck a rock and sank at Cephalonia, Greece. She was on a voyage from Messina, Kingdom of the Two Sicilies to Cephalonia
Gratitude	United Kingdom	The ship was driven ashore on Gotland, Sweden. She was on a voyage from Saint Petersburg, Russia to London.
Peggy	United Kingdom	The ship was driven ashore and wrecked at Tynemouth Castle, Northumberland. She was on a voyage from London to Newcastle upon Tyne, Northumberland.
Prinz Carl	Lübeck	The ship foundered off Libava, Courland Governorate. She was on a voyage from Lübeck to Memel
Swiftsure	United Kingdom	The ship was driven ashore at Plymouth, Devon. She was on a voyage from London to Plymouth.

=== 6 December ===
List of shipwrecks: 6 December 1816
Ship	State	Description
Happy Return	United Kingdom	The ship was driven ashore near Quillebeuf-sur-Seine, Eure, France. She was later refloated.
Josefa	Spain	The ship was wrecked at Bilbao. She was on a voyage from London, United Kingdom to Bilbao.
Peggy	United Kingdom	The tender was wrecked at Tynemouth, Northumberland. Her crew were rescued. She was on a voyage from London to Newcastle upon Tyne, Northumberland.
Thomas and Ann	United Kingdom	The ship was driven ashore in the Isles of Scilly. She was on a voyage from Bideford to Plymouth, Devon.

=== 7 December ===
List of shipwrecks: 7 December 1816
Ship	State	Description
Fair Hibernian	United Kingdom	The ship arrived at Liebau, Courland Governorate from London in a sinking condition.
Favourite	United Kingdom	The ship was wrecked at Formby, Lancashire with the loss of all hands. She was on a voyage from Bristol, Gloucestershire to Liverpool, Lancashire.
Tartar	United Kingdom	The ship departed from Newcastle upon Tyne, Northumberland for Guernsey, Channel Islands. No further trace, presumed foundered with the loss of all hands.

=== 9 December ===
List of shipwrecks: 9 December 1816
Ship	State	Description
Bilboa	United Kingdom	The ship sank at South Shields, County Durham.
Dove	United Kingdom	The ship was wrecked on the Goodwin Sands, Kent. Her crew were rescued. She was on a voyage from Cardiff, Glamorgan to London.
Irlam	United Kingdom	The ship struck the quayside at Liverpool, Lancashire, pushing her anchor through her bows and became waterlogged. She was on a voyage from Barbados to Liverpool.
James and Mary	United Kingdom	The ship was driven ashore. She was on a voyage from Málaga, Spain to Dublin. She was refloated and put in to Baltimore, County Cork.
Roberts	United Kingdom	The ship ran aground on the Garrow Sand, in the North Sea and was damaged. She was later refloated and put into South Shields for repairs.
Sampson	United Kingdom	The ship was wrecked on the west coast of Guernsey, Channel Islands with the loss of all on board, more than seven lives. She was on a voyage from Gibraltar to London.

=== 10 December ===
List of shipwrecks: 10 December 1816
Ship	State	Description
Hart	(United Kingdom of Great Britain and Ireland) British North America	The ship foundered off Saint John, New Brunswick.
Swallow	United States	The ship was wrecked on Eleuthera, Bahamas. Her crew were rescued. She was on a voyage from Savannah, Georgia to Jamaica.

=== 11 December ===
List of shipwrecks: 11 December 1816
Ship	State	Description
Admiral Nelson	United Kingdom	The ship was beached at Aberdeen. She was on a voyage from Aberdeen to Dundee, Forfarshire.
Dove	United Kingdom	The ship was wrecked on the Goodwin Sands, Kent. Her crew were rescued. She was on a voyage from Cardiff, Glamorgan to London.
Edwin	United States	The ship was lost off Saint Domingo. She was on a voyage from New York to Saint Domingo.
Endeavour	United Kingdom	The ship was wrecked on the North Burroughes, off Bideford, Devon. Her crew were rescued. She was on a voyage from Waterford to London.
Good Intent	United Kingdom	The ship was wrecked on the Shipwash Sand, in the North Sea. Her crew were rescued. She was on a voyage from Liverpool, Lancashire to Great Yarmouth, Norfolk.
Providence	Sweden	The ship was wrecked at Stockholm.

=== 12 December ===
List of shipwrecks: 12 December 1816
Ship	State	Description
USS Chippewa	United States Navy	The brig struck a reef off East Caicos and foundered. Her 90 crew survived.
Mary	United Kingdom	The ship was wrecked at St. Mary's, Isles of Scilly. Her crew were rescued. She was on a voyage from Rio de Janeiro to Liverpool, Lancashire.
St. Mary	United Kingdom	The ship was driven ashore at Hell Head, Isle of Wight. She was later refloated and taken in to Cowes.

=== 13 December ===
List of shipwrecks: 13 December 1816
Ship	State	Description
Elizabeth	France	The ship was wrecked near Cardigan, United Kingdom. Her crew were rescued. She was on a voyage from Cette, Hérault to Havre de Grâce, Seine-Inférieure.
Jonge Hendrich	Sweden	The ship was wrecked on the coast of Jutland. She was on a voyage from Aberdeen, United Kingdom to Gothenburg.
Pandora	United Kingdom	The ship sank off Rothesay, Bute. All on board were rescued. She was on a voyage from Glasgow, Renfrewshire to Dublin.
St. Alexy	Russia	The ship was wrecked on the west coast of Guernsey, Channel Islands with the loss of all but one of her crew. She was on a voyage from Lisbon, Portugal to Antwerp, Netherlands.

=== 14 December ===
List of shipwrecks: 14 December 1816
Ship	State	Description
Amalia	Malta	The ship was wrecked at Rye, Sussex, United Kingdom with the loss of all but one of her crew. She was on a voyage from Malta to Amsterdam, North Holland, Netherlands.
Ann	United Kingdom	The ship was driven ashore and wrecked at Corton, Suffolk.
Ann and Mary	United Kingdom	The sloop was wrecked off Ballywalter, County Down with the loss of all hands.
Camperdown	United Kingdom	The ship was driven ashore and wrecked between Broadstairs and Kingsgate, Kent. She was on a voyage from London to São Miguel, Azores, Portugal.
Deux Amis	France	The ship was driven ashore near Broadstairs. She was on a voyage from London to Dieppe, Seine-Inférieure. Deux Amis was later refloated and taken in to Broadstairs.
Die Gutte	Russia	The ship ran aground off the Cordouan Lighthouse, Gironde, France and was abandoned by her crew. She subsequently came ashore at Royan, Charente-Maritime, France. Die Gutte was on a voyage from Saint Petersburg to Bordeaux, Gironde.
Hope	United Kingdom	The ship was driven on to the Fairness Rock, off Margate, Kent. She was on a voyage from Waterford to London. Hope was later refloated.
Isabella	United Kingdom	The ship was driven ashore and sunk at North Shields, County Durham.
Lord Somers	United Kingdom	The ship was driven ashore and wrecked near Dover, Kent. Her crew were rescued. She was on a voyage from Montreal, Lower Canada, British North America to London.
Lune	United Kingdom	The transport ship was driven ashore at Great Yarmouth, Norfolk. She was refloated on 25 December and taken in to Great Yarmouth.
Malvina	United Kingdom	The ship was driven ashore at Gravesend, Kent. She was on a voyage from Miramichi, New Brunswick, British North America to London. Malvina was later refloated and resumed her voyage.
Margaret	United Kingdom	The ship was driven ashore and wrecked at Rye. Her crew were rescued. She was on a voyage from Portsmouth, Hampshire to Sunderland, County Durham.
Maria Dous Irmanos	Portugal	The ship was driven ashore near Ramsgate, Kent. She was on a voyage from Faial Island, Azores to Havre de Grâce, Seine-Inférieure. Maria Dous Irmanos was later refloated and taken in to Ramsgate.
Nelson	United Kingdom	The sloop was driven ashore at Newhaven, Sussex. Her crew were rescued. She was on a voyage from Southampton, Hampshire to London. Nelson was refloated on 23 December but was discovered to be leaky and was beached. She was subsequently wrecked.
Nile	United Kingdom	The ship was wrecked on the Swine Bottoms, in the Baltic Sea. She was on a voyage from Hull, Yorkshire to Danzig.
Unnamed	France	The brig was lost off Minorca, Spain.

=== 15 December ===
List of shipwrecks: 15 December 1816
Ship	State	Description
Camperdown	United Kingdom	The ship was driven ashore and wrecked at Broadstairs, Kent. She was on a voyage from London to São Miguel Island, Azores.
Rover	United Kingdom	The ship was driven ashore and damaged at Mount Batten, Devon. She was on a voyage from Plymouth, Devon to Newcastle upon Tyne, Northumberland. Rover was later refloated.
HMRC Swallow	Board of Customs	The ship was discovered at sea crewless and was taken in to Ramsgate, Kent by some Deal boatmen.

=== 16 December ===
List of shipwrecks: 16 December 1816
Ship	State	Description
Eliza	United Kingdom	The ship ran aground and sank at Cork. She was on a voyage from Málaga, Spain to Cork.
Governor Rial	Portugal	The ship departed from Madeira for Charleston, South Carolina, United States and Grenada. No further trace, presumed foundered with the loss of all hands.
Hibernia	United States	The ship struck a rock and was wrecked at Portsmouth, New Hampshire. She was on voyage from Portsmouth to Barbados.

=== 17 December ===
List of shipwrecks: 17 December 1816
Ship	State	Description
Edward	United Kingdom	The ship was driven ashore and wrecked on Texel, North Holland, Netherlands with the loss of all hands.
Lisette	Hamburg	The ship was wrecked on Guiana Island, Bahamas.
Lord Somers	United Kingdom	The ship, which had been driven ashore between Dover and Folkestone, Kent on 14 December, was destroyed by fire.

=== 18 December ===
List of shipwrecks: 18 December 1816
Ship	State	Description
Elizabeth and Mary	United Kingdom	The sloop was wrecked in Cardigan Bay. She was on a voyage from Cardigan to Liverpool, Lancashire.

=== 19 December ===
List of shipwrecks: 19 December 1816
Ship	State	Description
Aimwell	United Kingdom	The ship was wrecked on Grand Caicos. Her crew were rescued. She was on a voyage from Portland, Dorset to Jamaica.
Broederschap	Netherlands	The ship foundered off the "Rusmansgat". Her crew were rescued. She was on a voyage from Philadelphia, Pennsylvania, United States to Amsterdam, North Holland.
Euphrates	United Kingdom	The ship was wrecked near Calais, France, with the loss of all hands. She was on a voyage from Great Yarmouth, Norfolk to Liverpool, Lancashire.
Hercules	Netherlands	The ship foundered in the North Sea off Terschelling, Friesland with the loss of six of her crew. She was on a voyage from Pillau, Russia to Amsterdam.
HMS Maeander	Royal Navy	The Leda-class frigate ran aground on the Outer Gabbard Sand, in the North Sea off the coast of Suffolk. She was on a voyage from Sheerness, Kent to Leith, Lothian. She was refloated and put back to Sheerness, where she arrived on 22 December in a sinking condition.
Samuel	United Kingdom	The ship foundered off Flamborough Head, Yorkshire. She was on a voyage from Sunderland, County Durham to Boston, Lincolnshire.
Telegraph	United Kingdom	The ketch was driven ashore and wrecked at Wells-next-the-Sea, Norfolk. She was on a voyage from Great Yarmouth to Hull, Yorkshire.
Venus	France	The ship was wrecked whilst on a voyage from Martinique to Bordeaux, Gironde.

=== 20 December ===
List of shipwrecks: 20 December 1816
Ship	State	Description
Flor de Tejo	Portugal	The ship was wrecked on the Cachapos Rocks, off Lisbon with the loss of all but three of her crew. She was on a voyage from Pará, Brazil to Lisbon.
Fortuna	Netherlands	The ship was driven ashore at Kragerø, Norway. She was on a voyage from Strömstadt, Sweden to Amsterdam, North Holland.
Hamilton	United States	The ship capsized in the Atlantic Ocean. Six survivors were rescued by Victory (United States). Hamilton was on a voyage from Portland, Maine to Grenada.
Liberty	United Kingdom	The brig was wrecked near Havana, Cuba.
William and Jane	United Kingdom	The ship was lost near Thornham, Norfolk with the loss of a crew member. She was on a voyage from Bremen to Hull, Yorkshire.
Zeevogel	Netherlands	The ship was lost off Menorca, Spain. She was on a voyage from Marseille, Bouches-du-Rhône, France to Antwerp.

=== 21 December ===
List of shipwrecks: 21 December 1816
Ship	State	Description
Argo	United Kingdom	The ship was driven ashore at Spittal Point, Northumberland. She was on a voyage from Hull, Yorkshire to Berwick upon Tweed, Northumberland. She was refloated on 1 January 1817.
Vrow Hester	Netherlands	The ship was driven ashore on the Surinam coast.

=== 22 December ===
List of shipwrecks: 22 December 1816
Ship	State	Description
Kleyn Jan	Netherlands	The ship foundered in the North Sea 3 leagues (9 nautical miles (17 km) off Ostend, West Flanders, Netherlands. Her crew survived. She was refloated on 28 December and beached on the coast of West Flanders, where she was subsequently wrecked.
18 unnamed vessels	United Kingdom	The keelboats were driven out to sea from Sunderland, County Durham and were all lost.

=== 23 December ===
List of shipwrecks: 23 December 1816
Ship	State	Description
Agnes	United States	The ship was wrecked at Annotta Bay, Jamaica.
Chance	United Kingdom	The ship was wrecked at Baggy Point, Devon. Her crew were rescued, She was on a voyage from Waterford to Bristol, Gloucestershire.
Chepstow	United Kingdom	The brig was wrecked on Mort Point, Devon with the loss of six of her nine crew. She was on a voyage from Portsmouth, Hampshire to Chepstow, Monmouthshire.
Elizabeth	United Kingdom	The ship was wrecked at Whitby, Yorkshire.
Elizabeth	United Kingdom	The ship was driven ashore on the coast of County Wexford and wrecked. She was on a voyage from London to Cork.
Elizabeth & Phillis	United Kingdom	The sloop was wrecked at Pembrey, Carmarthenshire with the loss of all but her captain. She was on a voyage from Penzance, Cornwall to Newport, Monmouthshire.
Flying Fish	United Kingdom	The ketch was wrecked at Pembrey with the loss of all hands.
Mary & Robert	United Kingdom	The sloop was wrecked at Pembrey with the loss of all hands.
Milford	United States	The ship was lost on Heneagua. Her crew were rescued. She was on a voyage from Baltimore, Maryland to Cape Henry, Virginia.
Unnamed	United Kingdom	The ship was lost in the Black Sea.
Several unnamed vessels	Flags unknown	The ships were lost in the Black Sea.

=== 24 December ===
List of shipwrecks: 24 December 1816
Ship	State	Description
Britannia	United Kingdom	The ship was driven ashore on Key Acklands. She was on a voyage from St. Anne's Bay, Jamaica to New York, United States.
Ceres	United Kingdom	The ship departed from King's Lynn, Norfolk for Leith, Lothian. No further trace, presumed foundered in the North Sea with the loss of all hands.
Fergus	United Kingdom	The ship capsized at North Shields, County Durham.
Mary	United Kingdom	The ship departed from Prince Edward Island, British North America for Falmouth, Cornwall. She subsequently foundered in the "Bay of Antigunieau".
Polpero	United Kingdom	The ship was driven ashore near Le Tréport Seine-Inférieure, France. She was on a voyage from London to Dieppe, Seine-Inférieure.
Unnamed	Flag unknown	The brig was lost in the "Bay of Antigunieau".

=== 25 December ===
List of shipwrecks: 25 December 1816
Ship	State	Description
Ann	United States	The ship was wrecked in the Caicos Islands. She was on a voyage from Charleston, South Carolina to Port Antonio, Jamaica.
Fox	United Kingdom	The transport ship ran aground at Bembridge, Isle of Wight. She was later refloated and taken in to Portsmouth, Hampshire.

=== 26 December ===
List of shipwrecks: 26 December 1816
Ship	State	Description
Amiable Antoinette	United States	The ship was wrecked near St. Augustine, East Florida. Her crew were rescued.
Charles	United Kingdom	The ship was driven ashore at Villa do Conde, Portugal. She was on a voyage from Cardiff, Glamorgan to Oporto, Portugal
Kingston	United Kingdom	The ship foundered in the North Sea between South Shields, County Durham and Newcastle upon Tyne, Northumberland. Her crew were rescued. She was on a voyage from Great Yarmouth, Norfolk to Newcastle upon Tyne.

=== 28 December ===
List of shipwrecks: 28 December 1816
Ship	State	Description
Agnes	United Kingdom	The ship was driven ashore in Tramore Bay. She was on a voyage from Greenock, Renfrewshire to Gibraltar and Malta. Agnes was later refloated and taken in to "Rhineshart".
Ann	United Kingdom	The brig was wrecked on the Herd Sand, in the North Sea off South Shields, County Durham.
Kelly	United Kingdom	The ship was wrecked on the Hoyle Bank, in Liverpool Bay, with the loss of all hands. She was on a voyage from Belfast, County Antrim to Liverpool, Lancashire.
Margaret	United Kingdom	The sloop was driven ashore at Cruden Bay, Aberdeenshire. Her crew were rescued. She was on a voyage from Gordon, Aberdeenshire to the River Spey.
Maria	United Kingdom	The ship was driven ashore in Bigbury Bay. She was on a voyage from Seville, Spain to London.
Peggy	United Kingdom	The ship was wrecked near Montrose, Forfarshire with the loss of three lives. She was on a voyage from Newcastle upon Tyne to Arbroath, Forfarshire.
Perseverance	United Kingdom	The ship was driven ashore at "Drumfork Ferry".
Samuel and Elizabeth	United Kingdom	The ship struck the pier at Ramsgate, Kent and was beached. She was on a voyage from London to Liverpool.
Union	United Kingdom	The ship was wrecked in Bigbury Bay. Her crew were rescued. She was on a voyage from Mogadore, Morocco to London.
Wellington	United Kingdom	The ship was driven ashore at Crosby, Lancashire. Her crew were rescued. She was on a voyage from Jamaica to Liverpool.

=== 29 December ===
List of shipwrecks: 29 December 1816
Ship	State	Description
Ann	United Kingdom	The ship was wrecked on the Herd Sand, in the North Sea off South Shields, County Durham. Her crew were rescued by the South Shields Lifeboat. She was on a voyage from Great Yarmouth, Norfolk to Leith, Lothian.
Anne Elizabeth	Russia	The ship was driven ashore on Vargö, Sweden. She was on a voyage from Riga to Bilbao, Spain. She was later refloated
Frau Anna Margaretha	Netherlands	The ship was driven ashore on Vargö. She was on a voyage from Reval, Russian Empire to Amsterdam, North Holland. She was later refloated.
Maria Sophia	Netherlands	The ship was driven ashore on Vargö. She was on a voyage from "Holbeck" to Rotterdam, South Holland. She was later refloated.
Mary	United Kingdom	The ship foundered off Prince Edward Island, British North America with the loss of a life. She was on a voyage from Prince Edward Island to Bristol, Gloucestershire.
Neptune	United Kingdom	The ship foundered in the North Sea off Lowestoft, Suffolk. Her crew were rescued. She was on a voyage from Leeds, Yorkshire to London.
St Antonio	Portugal	The brig sprang a leak and foundered in the Atlantic Ocean off St. Ubes. All on board were rescued. She was on a voyage from Madeira to Lisbon.
Stockton	United Kingdom	The packet ship, a sloop, ran aground on the Herd Sand. Her crew were rescued by the South Shields Lifeboat. She was on a voyage from Leith, Lothian to Newcastle upon Tyne, Northumberland. She was refloated on 31 December.

=== 30 December ===
List of shipwrecks: 30 December 1816
Ship	State	Description
Eliza	United Kingdom	The ship was driven ashore at Milford, Pembrokeshire. She was on a voyage from Smyrna, Ottoman Empire to Liverpool, Lancashire.
Flor de Tejo	Portugal	The ship was wrecked on the Cachopos, near Lisbon with the loss of all but three of her crew. She was on a voyage from Pará, Brazil to Lisbon.
Sibella	United Kingdom	The ship was wrecked near Brest, Finistère, France. She was on a voyage from the Canary Islands, Spain to London.

=== 31 December ===
List of shipwrecks: 31 December 1816
Ship	State	Description
Mary & Dorothy	United Kingdom	The ship was driven ashore at Sunderland, County Durham.

=== Unknown date ===
List of shipwrecks: Unknown date in December 1816
Ship	State	Description
Alexey	Russia	The ship was wrecked on the coast of Guernsey, Channel Islands.
Ann	United Kingdom	The ship was driven ashore at Great Yarmouth, Norfolk. Her crew were rescued.
Anna Maria	Netherlands	The ship foundered in the Vlie with the loss of all hands in late December. She was on a voyage from Harlingen, Friesland to London, United Kingdom.
Ann and Harriet	United Kingdom	The ship was wrecked on the Haaks Sandbank, in the North Sea. She was on a voyage from Antwerp, Netherlands to London.
Ann and Mary	United Kingdom	The sloop foundered near Ballywater, County Antrim with the loss of all hands.
Boreas	Russia	The ship was driven ashore at Dagerort in early December. She was on a voyage from St. Ubes, Portugal to Vyborg.
Caroline	United Kingdom	The ship was driven ashore at Calais, France. She was on a voyage from Cardiff, Glamorgan to Dunkerque, Nord, France. Caroline was refloated on 7 December and taken in to Calais.
Christian August	Denmark	The ship was driven ashore on the Swedish coast. She was on a voyage from St. Croix to Copenhagen. Christian August was refloated on 7 December.
De Hoop	Netherlands	The ship was driven ashore at "Petlen", She was on a voyage from Demerara to Amsterdam, North Holland.
Diana	United Kingdom	The ship was wrecked at Tarifa, Spain with the loss of all but four of her crew. She was on a voyage from Mallorca, Spain to Portsmouth, Hampshire.
Dorset	United Kingdom	The ship was blown out of The Downs during a gale in late December. No further trace, presumed foundered with the loss of all hands. She was on a voyage from South Shields, County Durham to a Mediterranean port.
Gloria do Portugal	Portugal	The ship was driven ashore at Vila do Conde before 10 December. She was later refloated.
Hamilton	United States	The ship was abandoned whilst on a voyage from Portland, Maine to Grenada.
Johanna	(Russian Empire) Grand Duchy of Finland	The ship was driven ashore at Dagerort in early December. She was on a voyage from Helsingfors to Oporto, Portugal.
Liberty	United Kingdom	The brig was wrecked near Havana, Cuba.
Magdalen	United Kingdom	The ship was wrecked on the Florida Reef. She was on a voyage from New Orleans, Louisiana, United States to Liverpool.
Mary	United Kingdom	The ship foundered off Tory Island, County Donegal with the loss of all hands. She was on a voyage from Limerick to Liverpool.
Mercator	United Kingdom	The ship was lost near Christiansand, Norway.
HMS Mistletoe	Royal Navy	The schooner foundered in the English Channel off the coast of Sussex with the loss of all 37 crew. She was last seen on 14 December.
Nelly	United Kingdom	The ship foundered in the Irish Sea off Howth, County Dublin. Her crew were rescued. She was on a voyage from Greenock, Renfrewshire to Rio de Janeiro.
New York	United States	The ship was driven ashore at Sligo, United Kingdom.
Pay Manoel	Portugal	The ship ran aground off the coast of County Dublin and was severely damaged. She was on a voyage from Liverpool, Lancashire, United Kingdom to Oporto. She was refloated and put back to Liverpool.
Petite Jean	Netherlands	The ship foundered on a voyage from Ostend, West Flanders, Netherlands to London.
Recovery	United Kingdom	The ship was lost near "Vintry". Her crew were rescued. She was on a voyage from Limerick to London.
Speculator	United Kingdom	The ship was wrecked in Sligo Bay. She was on a voyage from Glasgow, Renfrewshire to Sligo.
William	United Kingdom	The ship ran aground in the Elbe. She was on a voyage from Hamburg to London. She was refloated and put in to Cuxhaven, where she arrived on 21 December.
Woodhouse	United Kingdom	The ship was wrecked on the Gunfleet Sand, in the North Sea. Her crew were rescued. She was on a voyage from Rotterdam, South Holland, Netherlands to London.
Zorg en Vlyt	Netherlands	The ship departed from Rotterdam for Hull, Yorkshire, United Kingdom in early December. No further trace, presumed foundered with the loss of all hands.

== Unknown date ==
List of shipwrecks: Unknown date in 1816
Ship	State	Description
Albion	United Kingdom	The transport was lost at sea.
Alompri	United States	The ship was driven ashore in the Abaco Islands. Her crew were rescued. She was on a voyage from New York to New Orleans, Louisiana.
Alpha	(United States) Missouri Territory	The ship foundered. Her crew were rescued.
Anna	United Kingdom	The ship was lost at sea in 1816 or 1817.
Anna Carolina	Hamburg	The ship foundered in the Mediterranean Sea. Her crew were rescued. She was on a voyage from Messina, Kingdom of Sicily to Hamburg.
Ariel	United Kingdom	The ship was wrecked on the coast of British Honduras. She was on a voyage from British Honduras to London.
Canton	United Kingdom	The ship was wrecked on Sibylla Island, Marshall Islands.
Catharine Osmond	United Kingdom	The ship was wrecked on the coast of East Florida, New Spain. She was on a voyage from Havana, Cuba to Salem, Massachusetts.
Charter	United States	The ship was wrecked on Great Isaac Cay, Bahamas. Her crew were rescued. She was on a voyage from Baltimore, Maryland to Havana, Cuba.
Cooler	United Kingdom	The ship was wrecked on the Square Handkerchief Reef. She was on a voyage from Philadelphia, Pennsylvania, United States to Jamaica.
Cottage Maid	United Kingdom	The ship was lost in Placentia Bay. She was on a voyage from St. John's, Newfoundland, British North America to Placentia, Newfoundland.
Creole	United Kingdom	The ship was wrecked on "Gilion Island". Her crew were rescued.
Duchess of Wellington	United Kingdom	The East Indiaman was destroyed by fire at Bengal, India.
Duke of Argyle	United Kingdom	The ship was driven ashore on Rathlin Island, County Antrim. She was on a voyage from Leith, Lothian to Londonderry.
Elephant	United Kingdom	The ship was wrecked on the Brazilian coast. She was on a voyage from Madeira, Portugal to Pará, Brazil.
Eliza	United States	The ship was wrecked on Ocracoke Island, North Carolina. She was on a voyage from Jamaica to Philadelphia, Pennsylvania.
Eliza Ann	United Kingdom	The ship was driven ashore in the Gulf of Florida.
Frolic	United States	The ship was wrecked on Anastasia Island, East Florida. Her crew were rescued. She was on a voyage from Havana to Charleston, South Carolina.
Expedition	United States	The ship was wrecked on Great Isaac Cay. Her crew were rescued.
Henrietta	United Kingdom	The ship was wrecked. Her crew were rescued by an American vessel. She was on a voyage from Cambeltown, Argyllshire to Glasgow, Renfrewshire.
John & Samuel	United Kingdom	The ship was lost at Richibucto, New Brunswick.
Julion	(United Kingdom of Great Britain and Ireland) British North America	The ship was lost off Cape Sable Island, Nova Scotia. She was on a voyage from Halifax, Nova Scotia to Saint John, New Brunswick.
Lardigable	United States	The ship was wrecked on the Little Isaacs. Her crew were rescued. She was on a voyage from Charleston, South Carolina to Havana.
Lord Wellington	United Kingdom	The ship ran aground at Bermuda. She was on a voyage from London to Bermuda and Jamaica. She had been refloated by 15 March.
Mary	United Kingdom	The ship was wrecked in the Berry Islands. Her crew were rescued.
Mary	United Kingdom	The ship was lost on Anegada, Virgin Islands. She was on a voyage from Jamaica to Veracruz, Viceroyalty of New Granada.
Minerva	United Kingdom	The ship foundered in the Bahama Channel.
Minerva	United Kingdom	The ship was lost off Cape Maize. She was on a voyage from Crooked Island, Bahamas to Kingston, Jamaica.
Minerva	United States	The ship foundered with the loss of all hands. She was on a voyage from New Orleans to Port-au-Prince, Haiti.
Nautilus	(United Kingdom of Great Britain and Ireland) New South Wales	The brig was wrecked at the mouth of the Hunter River before 14 December.
Neptune	United Kingdom	The ship was driven ashore and wrecked at Amelia Island, New Spain. She was on a voyage from Amelia Island to Jamaica.
New Orleans	(United States) Missouri Territory	The ship was driven ashore in the Abaco Islands. Her crew were rescued. She was on a voyage from New York to New Orleans.
Ocean	United States	The ship foundered whilst on a voyage from Charleston, South Carolina to Liverpool. Her crew were rescued.
Rambler	United Kingdom	The ship was wrecked at Cape St. Mary's, Nova Scotia, British North America with the loss of all hands. She was on a voyage from St. Andrews, New Brunswick to Newfoundland, British North America.
Rebecca	United States	The ship was wrecked on the coast of East Florida. She was on a voyage from Havana to Savannah, Georgia.
Rebecca and Sarah	United Kingdom	The ship foundered in the Gulf of Finland. She was on a voyage from London to Saint Petersburg, Russia.
Rhine	United Kingdom	The ship was lost off Campeche, Viceroyalty of New Granada. She was on a voyage from New Orleans to Campeche.
Rosa	Spain	African slave trade: The ship foundered off the Abaco Islands. All on board, over 300 people, were rescued. She was on a voyage from an African port to Havana, Cuba.
Ruby	United States	The ship foundered with the loss of all hands. She was on a voyage from Port-au-Prince, Haiti to Philadelphia, Pennsylvania.
Savannah	United Kingdom	The ship was wrecked on the Macaries Reef. Her crew were rescued. She was on a voyage from Liverpool to New Orleans.
Three Sisters	(United Kingdom of Great Britain and Ireland) Bahamas	The ship was wrecked on the Carysfort Reef. She was on a voyage from New York to Nassau.
Tiger	United Kingdom	The ship was wrecked at Cabo São Roque, Brazil. She was on a voyage from London to Rio de Janeiro. Agreeable took her cargo into Rio de Janeiro.
Trial	(United Kingdom of Great Britain and Ireland) New South Wales	The ship was wrecked in Trial Bay with the ultimate loss of all thirteen crew.
Udney	United Kingdom	The ship was driven ashore and severely damaged at Rangoon before 30 September. She was later refloated.
Wanstead	United Kingdom	The ship foundered off Maranhão, Brazil. She was on a voyage from Maranhão to Liverpool, Lancashire.
Warwick	United Kingdom	The ship struck a rock off Saint Thomas, Virgin Islands and foundered. Her crew were rescued.
Wellington	United Kingdom	The schooner foundered off Montevideo.
Windsor	(United Kingdom of Great Britain and Ireland) New South Wales	The sloop was wrecked on the Long Reef, off Sydney. All on board survived.
Unnamed	United States	The ship was wrecked on Great Isaak Key. Her crew were rescued. She was on a voyage from Baltimore to Havana.
Unnamed	Flag unknown	The ship was lost in the Gulf of Finland.
