= List of disasters in Great Britain and Ireland by death toll =

The following list of disasters in Great Britain and Ireland is a list of major disasters (excluding acts of war (Note: Military and civilian casualties from conflicts in which the United Kingdom was involved are listed at United Kingdom casualties of war.)) which relate to the United Kingdom, Ireland or the Isle of Man, or to the states that preceded them, or that involved their citizens, in a definable incident or accident such as a shipwreck, where the loss of life was forty or more.

== Over 1,000 fatalities ==
Deaths Italics indicate an estimated figure	Event	Year	Notes
3,500,000	Black Death pandemic	1347–1350	See discussion of death toll estimates in death toll section
1,000,000 to 1,500,000	Great Irish Famine	1845–1849	See discussion of death toll estimates in death toll section
300,000 to 480,000	Great Irish Famine of 1740–41 (The Great Frost)	1740–1741	Some estimates indicate a death toll as high as 500,000 from starvation and disease.
250,000	1918 influenza pandemic	1918 (September–November)	An estimated 200,000 people died in England and Wales. Although the official number of deaths in Scotland due to the pandemic is 17,575, a modern estimate of total pandemic mortality in Scotland is between 27,641 and 33,771. About 20,000 died in Ireland.
241,000+	COVID-19 pandemic in the United Kingdom and COVID-19 pandemic in the Republic of Ireland	2020–2023	The COVID-19 pandemic caused a worldwide death toll of over 7.1 million people.
200,000+	1557 influenza pandemic	1557–1561	From 1557 to 1559 the population contracted by 2%.
150,000+	Seven ill years	1695–1699	The last major famine to occur in Scotland. Marked by large-scale migration, especially to Ireland.
125,000	1889–1890 flu pandemic	1889–1893	Influenza pandemic originating from St Petersburg, Russia
100,000+	Sweating sickness (sudor anglicus)	1485 ff.	Mysterious disease which killed tens of thousands of people in each of five outbreaks before disappearing.
80,000	Hong Kong flu pandemic	1968–1970	Influenza pandemic. Figure for UK deaths only.
78,319+	Third cholera pandemic	1848–1854	First cases in Edinburgh in October 1848. Major outbreaks across Britain, including the famous 1854 Broad Street cholera outbreak, where John Snow was able to identify contaminated water as being the source of the disease. Estimate is for deaths in Great Britain only.
75,000+	Great Plague of London	1665–1666	The last major epidemic of the bubonic plague to occur in England
65,000	Year Without a Summer	1816	Famine and typhoid fever in Ireland and food riots in England and France, caused by the 1815 eruption of Mount Tambora affecting the weather
60,000	1847–48 influenza pandemic	1847–1848	Worldwide influenza outbreak
52,627 (Note: Assuming the population of England as 21,361,235 (1871 census) and of Scotland as 3,360,018 (1871 census))	1870–1875 Europe smallpox epidemic	1870–1875	Mortality figure for England and Scotland only. The epidemic started during the Franco-Prussian War, and spread throughout Europe.
41,644+	1837–1840 smallpox epidemic	1837–1840	Especially severe smallpox epidemic
40,000	1603 London plague epidemic	1603	Bubonic plague epidemic in London
40,000	1775–76 England Influenza outbreak	1775–1776	Unusually deadly influenza epidemic
35,417	1625 London plague epidemic	1625	Bubonic plague epidemic in London
33,000	Asian flu pandemic	1957–1958	Influenza pandemic which originated in Guizhou, China
32,854	Second cholera pandemic	1831–1833	The disease arrived in Britain from Asia in October 1831. Major outbreaks in various cities. Cases tailed off after 1833.
23,000 (Note: Estimate of mortality in Britain)	"Laki haze"	1783–1784 (June–February)	Eruption of a volcano in Iceland sent a huge toxic gas cloud across Britain, killing thousands.
20,100+	1563 London plague	1563–1564	Bubonic plague epidemic in London
20,000	1235 famine	1235	London badly affected; many resorted to eating tree bark for survival.
19,900+	1592–93 London plague	1592–1593	Bubonic plague epidemic in London
17,000+	1257 Samalas eruption	1258	Crop failures and famines caused by the 1257 Samalas eruption in Indonesia affecting the weather; around 15,000 died in London.
15,785 to 16,447	HIV/AIDS pandemic	1979–present	Approximately 12,105 had died in the UK by 1996. Between 1997 and 2012, 2,450 died of AIDS-related illness in England and Wales. Between 2013 and 2018, approximately 832–1,494 had died because of HIV/AIDS in the UK. (Note: While the annual government statistics in these years all record the number of people who died whilst being infected with HIV, only the two most recent reports (2018 and 2019) specify the number of these deaths that are assumed to be attributable to "AIDS-defining illnesses". However, the most recent report (2019) specifies that 22% to 47% of deaths of those living with a HIV infection can be assumed to have been as a result of an AIDS-defining illness, and, using these figures, it can be estimated that approximately 832–1494 have died from AIDS-defining illness between 2013 and 2018.) About 398 died in Ireland by 2005.
15,548+	Fourth cholera pandemic	1865–1873	Major outbreaks in 1865 and 1866. Smaller outbreaks in Scotland in 1873.
12,000	Storegga Slide	6200 BC	Massive submarine landslides off the coast of Norway caused a huge tsunami to hit the eastern coast of Britain, killing 12,000 prehistoric Britons. This was one quarter of the entire population at the time.
8,000	Great Storm of 1703	1703 (26 November)	Atlantic hurricane across southern England and the English Channel; deaths chiefly at sea, including 1083 in naval ships wrecked on Goodwin Sands
7,600	Winter of 1894–95	1894–1895 (December–February)	An eight-week period of severe cold weather with a weekly death rate of around 950
6,500+	1729 Influenza epidemic	1729 (September–December)	Influenza outbreak with very high mortality rates
5,000+	1836–37 influenza pandemic	1836–1837	Influenza outbreak with high mortality rates
5,000+	Great Famine (14th century)	1315–1317	
4,000 to 12,000	Great Smog of London	1952 (December)	
4,000 to 7,000	HMT Lancastria	1940 (17 June)	Largest single-ship loss of life in British maritime history
4,000	1911 United Kingdom heat wave	1911 (July–September)	Newspapers ran "deaths from heat" columns.
3,500+	1782 Central Atlantic hurricane	1782 (16‍–‍17 September)	Loss of HMS Ramillies, HMS Centaur; storeships Dutton and British Queen; captured French prize ships Ville de Paris, Glorieux, Hector, and Caton; plus other merchantmen
3,200+	The encephalitis lethargica pandemic of 1915–1926	1917–1924	Some victims were left in a statue-like condition, and many survivors never returned to their pre-existing "aliveness"; it is thought that the Spanish flu pandemic, which coincided with the encephalitis pandemic, contributed to the severity of the disease.
3,000+	Tainted blood scandal	1970s–1980s (deaths up to decades later)	Importing and use of blood products known to be contaminated with HIV, Hepatitis B, C & E. People continue to die up to the present time.
3,000	1212 Great Fire of London	1212 (10 July)	Source for fatalities is the Guinness Book of Records but historical evidence unclear
3,000	1976 British Isles heat wave	1976 (23 June – 27 August)	At the time, the hottest summer in central England in 250 years
2,985	2022 European heatwaves	2022 saw five distinct extreme heat periods between 16 June and 25 August	The summer of 2022 saw the highest ever recorded temperature in England at 40.3C.
2,323	2006 European heatwave	2006 (26 June – 30 July)	
2,234	2003 European heat wave	2003 (4–13 August)	
2,200	1880 London coal smog	1880	
2,000+	1540 European drought; 1540 also known as the 'Big Sun Year'	1540–1541	Heat and drought caused freshwater from the Thames to shrink to such an unprecedented extent that seawater flowed on the tide past London Bridge, polluting the water supply. The resulting dysentery and cholera killed "thousands".
2,000	Bristol Channel floods	1607 (30 January)	
1,900+	Christmas Eve storm	1811 (24 December)	Wrecks HMS St George, Defence and Fancy off Thorsminde, Jutland; and HMS Hero and the transport Archimedes off Texel, Netherlands
1,550+	Scilly naval disaster	1707 (22 October)	HMS Association, HMS Eagle, Romney and Firebrand
1,500+	Peasants' Revolt	1381 (30 May – November)	Peasants protested against poll taxes, serfdom and the socio-economic tensions generated by the Black Death pandemic. Some marched on London demanding reform, and after initial successes were brutally suppressed.
1,496	RMS Titanic	1912 (15 April)	Estimates vary, but most official sources and historians put the death toll around 1500, most commonly 1496.
1,200	Strait of Gibraltar storm	1694 (1 March)	Wrecks HMS Sussex and accompanying ships
1,198	RMS Lusitania	1915 (7 May)	Struck by torpedo on starboard side. Sank in the Celtic Sea within 18 minutes.
1,012	RMS Empress of Ireland	1914 (29 May)	Canadian Pacific ship sank in Gulf of St. Lawrence, registered in UK with crew almost entirely from Merseyside
1,000+	1692 storm off Winterton Ness	1692	200 colliers wrecked off the Norfolk coast
1,000	1956 London smog	1956 (December)	
1,000	1867 San Narciso hurricane	1867 (29 October)	Up to 50 UK vessels driven ashore on Saint Thomas, Danish West Indies, including RMS Rhone and RMS Wye (180 deaths between these)
1,000	Great Hurricane of 1780 in the Caribbean	1780 (10 October)	Royal Navy ships lost included HMS Stirling Castle, HMS Laurel, HMS Andromeda, HMS Thunderer, and HMS Phoenix

== 200–999 fatalities ==
Deaths Italics indicate an estimated figure	Event	Year	Notes
908	2016 heat wave	2016 (September)	Included the hottest September day in the UK since 1911
900+	Plymouth Sound storm	1691 (3 September)	Wrecks HMS Coronation and HMS Harwich killing 600 + 300 respectively
900	HMS Victory	1744 (3 October)	Wrecked on the Casquets in the Channel Islands
892	2019 European heatwaves	2019 (July–August)	Temperatures were as high as 38.7 °C (101.7 °F) in Cambridge, the highest recorded in the UK at the time
890+	Quebec Expedition disaster	1711 (22 August)	Seven transport ships and one storeship wrecked in thick fog on the Saint Lawrence River, Canada
863	2018 British Isles heat wave	2018 (22 June – 7 August)	
843	HMS Vanguard explosion	1917 (9 July)	Magazine explosion in Scapa Flow
800	HMS Royal George capsizes	1782 (29 August)	At Spithead
780	1873 London smog	1873 (December)	The first in a series of major smog build-ups in London
779	1892 London smog	1892 (December)	Excess deaths from air pollution
778	2017 heat wave	2017 (June)	
748+	Royal Charter Storm	1859 (26 October)	The Royal Charter and other ships wrecked in Lligwy Bay, Anglesey
738	HMS Bulwark explosion	1914 (26 November)	Magazine explosion off Sheerness
700 to 800	1948 London smog	1948 (26 November – 1 December)	Excess deaths from air pollution
699	HMS Ramillies	1760 (15 February)	Ran aground off Bolt Head, Devon
690	HMS Queen Charlotte fire	1800 (17 March)	Exploded in the Tuscan Archipelago
646	SS Mendi	1917 (21 February)	Rammed by SS Darro off the Isle of Wight
640	Princess Alice disaster	1878 (3 September)	Collision with the Bywell Castle in the River Thames near Woolwich (Estimates vary, but most historians put the death toll as between 600 and 700)
635	SS Norge shipwreck	1904 (28 June)	Danish ship ran aground off Rockall
619	1995 Great Britain and Ireland heat wave	1995 (28 June – 22 August)	The hottest August on record in England and Wales since 1659
612	Tramore storm	1816 (30 January)	Wrecks the ships Sea Horse, Boadicea, and Lord Melville
600+	an unidentified troop ship	1796 (23 January)	Shipwreck possibly one of Admiral Christian's West Indies convoy wrecked on Loe Bar, Cornwall
564	SS Utopia disaster	1891 (17 March)	British ship carrying (mostly) Italian migrants in collision with HMS Anson off Gibraltar
546	SS Atlantic (1870)	1873 (1 April)	White Star liner struck rocks off Nova Scotia
540 to 760	2013 Great Britain and Ireland heat wave	2013 (July)	Estimate for UK deaths only
531+	1623–24 famine	1623–1624	East Lancashire badly affected; said to be the last peace-time famine in England.
531	1953 North Sea storm and flood	1953 (31 Jan – 1 Feb)	Included the ferry MV Princess Victoria
520	HMS Namur	1749 (14 April)	Wrecked in a storm near Fort St. David, India
500	HMS Minotaur	1810 (22 December)	Wrecked on Haak Bank near Texel, Netherlands
500	"Black Monday"	1209 (Easter Monday)	Massacre of English settlers by Irish clans, near Ranelagh, Dublin
491	HMS York	1804 (Jan)	Struck the Inchcape rock and sank with the loss of her entire crew
481	HMS Captain	1870 (7 September)	Sank off Cape Finisterre, Spain, due to design flaws
480	SS City of Glasgow	1854 (March)	Disappeared after leaving Liverpool for Philadelphia
473	Cospatrick	1874 (18 November)	Caught fire in the South Atlantic
464	HMS Courageux	1796 (18 December)	Shipwrecked at Apes' Hill, Barbary Coast (now Monte Hacho, Ceuta, Africa)
457	2009 swine flu pandemic	2009–2010	Global influenza pandemic, the second involving the influenza A virus subtype H1N1 after the Spanish flu
454	Vryheid	1802 (23 November)	Formerly Melville Castle, shipwrecked in a gale off the Kent coast between Hythe and Dymchurch; 18 of 472 on board survived
450	HMS Birkenhead	1852 (25 February)	Shipwrecked near Cape Town
450	Royal Charter	1859 (26 October)	Wrecked off Dulas Bay, Anglesey
439	Senghenydd colliery disaster	1913 (14 October)	Gas explosion at the Universal Colliery, Senghenydd, Caerphilly, Glamorganshire, Britain's worst mining accident
431	HMS Otranto	1918 (6 October)	Shipwrecked off Islay. 351 United States troops and 80 crew perished
424	Pomona	1859 (30 April)	American ship carrying, mainly Irish, emigrants from Liverpool to New York, wrecked on a sandbank at Ballyconigar, off Wexford, Ireland
421	HMS Natal	1915 (30 December)	Magazine explosion. Precise number of deaths disputed; 421 is highest estimate
400+	Sinking of Rochdale and Prince of Wales	1807 (20 November)	Ships carrying troops leaving Dublin for the Napoleonic Wars
400+	HMS Invincible	1801 (16 March)	Sank off Norfolk while en route to the Battle of Copenhagen
400	HMS Winchester	1695 (1 September)	Shipwrecked on a reef off Key Largo, Florida
400	Cataraqui	1845 (4 August)	Shipwrecked off King Island (Tasmania)
384	Annie Jane	1853 (28 September)	Emigrant ship out of Liverpool, wrecked on Vatersay in the Outer Hebrides of Scotland
361	The Oaks explosion	1866 (12 December)	Colliery disaster, Barnsley, Yorkshire (383 claimed but not verified)
380	Mary Rose	1545 (18 July)	Warship sank in action off Portsmouth
379	HMS Dasher	1943 (27 March)	Aircraft carrier: accidental fuel explosion in Firth of Clyde
374	Driver	1856 (February)	American clipper ship carrying migrants to the US out of Liverpool, disappeared while crossing the Atlantic Ocean
372	Arniston	1815 (30 May)	Wrecked at Waenhuiskrans, South Africa
369	Queen	1814 (14 Jan)	Wrecked in Carrick Roads, Cornwall
360+	Elizabeth	1810 (27 December)	Chartered East Indiaman wrecked off Dunkirk
358	HMS Victoria	1893 (22 June)	Rammed by HMS Camperdown in the Mediterranean Sea
352	HMS Princess Irene	1915 (27 May)	Explosion while on the River Medway, Sheerness
349	HMS Sceptre	1799 (5 November)	Wrecked during a storm in Table Bay, near the Cape of Good Hope
347	HMS Athenienne	1806 (20 October)	Wrecked off Tunisia; 100 survivors crammed into the ship's launch
344	Pretoria Pit Disaster	1910 (21 December)	Underground explosion at the Hulton Bank Colliery, Westhoughton, Lancashire
340	Aeneas	1805 (23 October)	Troopship wrecked on the Îles aux Mortes along the Canadian coastline while carrying troops to Quebec
338	HMS Curacoa	1942 (2 October)	Light cruiser run down and cut in two by RMS Queen Mary north of Ireland
335	SS Schiller	1875 (7 May)	German liner wrecked off the Isles of Scilly
329	Air India Flight 182	1985 (23 June)	Act of terror: destroyed by a bomb, crashed into the Atlantic Ocean while in Irish airspace
317	HMS Eurydice	1878 (22 March)	Sank off the Isle of Wight; commemorated by Gerard Manley Hopkins in the poem "The Loss of the Eurydice"
316+	Sybelle	1834 (11 September)	Emigrant ship out of Cromarty wrecked off St. Paul Island (Nova Scotia)
303	Kapunda	1887 (20 January)	Emigrant ship out of London, collided with the barque Ada Melmore off Brazil
300 to 400	1962 London smog	1962 (December)	
300	White Ship	1120 (25 November)	Shipwrecked off Barfleur, Normandy, taking the only legitimate son of King Henry I of England
300+	HMS Amphion	1796 (22 September)	Magazine explosion while at Plymouth, Devon
300	HMS London	1665 (7 March)	Accidental explosion while in the Thames Estuary
297	RMS Tayleur	1854 (21 January)	Shipwrecked off Lambay Island, Dublin Bay during its maiden voyage after its iron hull deflected its compass
293	Northfleet	1873 (22 January)	Rammed at night by a Spanish steamboat while anchored off Dungeness
290	Albion Colliery explosion	1894 (23 June)	Firedamp explosion at Cilfynydd in South Wales
285	Gordon Riots	1780 (2–13 June)	Rioters shot by troops
281	HMS Atalanta	1880 (31 January)	HMS Eurydice's sister ship, disappeared after leaving Bermuda bound for Falmouth, Cornwall
276	VOC Hollandia	1743 (13 June)	Shipwrecked off Annet, Isles of Scilly
270	Great Sheffield Flood	1864 (11 March)	Caused by collapse of Dale Dike Reservoir during its first filling
270	Pan Am Flight 103	1988 (21 December)	Blown apart at 31,000 ft over Lockerbie, Scotland, by terrorist bomb in hold
268	Abercarn colliery disaster	1878 (11 September)	Mining disaster at Abercarn, Monmouthshire
266	Gresford Disaster	1934 (22 September)	Mining accident near Wrexham, North Wales
260	Earl of Abergavenny	1805 (5 February)	East Indiaman shipwrecked off Portland Bill
253	HMS Saldanha	1811 (4 December)	Shipwrecked during gale off Lough Swilly, Donegal, Ireland
250+	Night of the Big Wind	1839 (6–7 January)	A severe windstorm sweeps across Ireland causing flooding and other damage
250+	RMS Royal Adelaide	1850 (30 March)	Irish paddle steamer shipwrecked on Tongue Sands off Margate, Kent
247	East Indiaman Doddington	1755 (17 July)	Shipwrecked in Algoa Bay, South Africa
246	HMS Avenger	1847 (20 December)	Wrecked off the Galite Islands, Tunisia
241	Exmouth	1847 (28 April)	Shipwrecked off Islay
240	HMS Lutine	1799 (9 October)	Shipwrecked off Vlieland
238	MV Dara	1961 (8 April)	British-India Steam Navigation Company passenger liner evacuated in the Persian Gulf off Dubai following explosion and fire
237	SS Anglo Saxon	1863 (27 April)	Canadian ship wrecked in dense fog off Cape Race, Newfoundland, Canada on passage from Liverpool
228	HMS Tribune	1797 (16 November)	Wrecked during a storm off Halifax, Nova Scotia, Canada
226	Quintinshill rail crash	1915 (22 May)	Three-train collision in Dumfries and Galloway, Scotland, Britain's worst railway accident
224	Neva	1835 (13 May)	Convict ship out of Cork wrecked on reefs off King Island, Tasmania
220	SS London	1866 (11 January)	Sank during gale in the Bay of Biscay
220	Great Blizzard of 1891	1891 (9–13 March)	Strong winds and snow across southern England lead to deaths on land and at sea
220	Hartley Colliery disaster	1862 (16 January)	Caused by steam engine metal fatigue, in Northumberland
215	Lady of the Lake	1833 (11 May)	Struck iceberg in the North Atlantic and sank
212	Sovereign	1814 (18 October)	Wrecked off St. Paul Island (Nova Scotia)
210	SS Rinaldo	1878 (18 December)	Collision with French steamship Byzantin (which sustains most casualties) in the Dardanelles
208	Harpooner	1816 (10 November)	Military transport ship shipwrecked off Newfoundland
207	Blantyre mining disaster	1877 (22 October)	Gas explosion in a Scottish colliery
205	SS Hungarian	1860 (20 February)	A Canadian Allan Line Royal Mail Steamer out of Liverpool and Queenstown (Cobh) wrecked off Cape Sable Island (Nova Scotia)
201	HMY Iolaire	1919 (1 January)	Admiralty yacht returning soldiers to the Isle of Lewis after World War I sank off Holm near Stornoway in the Outer Hebrides

== 100–199 fatalities ==
Deaths Italics indicate an estimated figure	Event	Year	Notes
193	Herald of Free Enterprise	1987 (6 March)	Ferry capsized off Zeebrugge in under one minute after its roll-on/roll-off bow doors were left open. Unlawful killing verdict.
192	Transport ship Dispatch and brig-of-war HMS Primrose	1809 (22 January)	Both ships sank after hitting The Manacles.
191	SS City of Boston (Inman Line)	1870 (after 28 January)	Ship out of New York City and Halifax, Nova Scotia, bound for Liverpool disappeared in the Atlantic Ocean, possibly struck an iceberg
189	Lundhill Colliery explosion	1857 (19 February)	Colliery disaster, Wombwell, Yorkshire.
189	Wood Pit Colliery explosion	1878 (7 June)	Colliery disaster, Haydock, Lancashire. The total fatalities, which included one man and all of his five sons, may have been 204 or more.
189	HMS Orpheus	1863 (7 February)	Sank off Auckland due to outdated nautical charts and shortcuts.
189	Eyemouth Disaster	1881 (14 October)	Local fishing fleet sank during a European windstorm that struck the southeast coast of Scotland.
186	Exeter Theatre Royal fire	1887 (5 September)	Fire at the Theatre Royal, Exeter caused by gas lights.
186	PS Pacific	1856 (after 23 January)	American ship lost at sea out of Liverpool (sister ship of SS Arctic)
183	Victoria Hall disaster	1883 (16 June)	Crowd crush at Sunderland after a children's variety show to get prizes and gifts resulted in compressive asphyxia and trampling.
179	SS Cambria	1870 (19 October)	Shipwrecked at Inishtrahull
178	United Kingdom BSE outbreak	1996–2001	Variant Creutzfeldt–Jakob disease outbreak in the UK. Known colloquially as "mad cow disease", victims contracted it by eating infected beef.
178	First Ferndale Colliery disaster	1867 (8 November)	Mining disaster in the Rhondda Valley, Glamorganshire, caused by gas accumulation and miners tampering with safety lamps
178	Ocean Monarch	1848 (24 August)	Shipwreck and fire off Great Orme, Llandudno caused by steerage passengers' smoking materials
178	Clifton Hall Colliery explosion	1885 (18 June)	Explosion of firedamp gas in a colliery at Salford
176	Turkish Airlines Flight 981	1974 (3 March)	Crashed in the Ermenonville Forest, France, due to cargo door design flaw. The flight was headed to London Heathrow and most of the passengers were British
176	Llannerch, Cwmnantddu	1890 (6 February)	Colliery gas explosion near Pontypool, Monmouthshire after the mine refused safety lamps by its MD two months earlier
173	Bethnal Green tube station panic	1943 (3 March)	Crowd crush caused by British anti-aircraft battery salvo
172	HMS Serpent	1890 (9 November)	Royal Navy torpedo cruiser launched in 1887 shipwrecked off Camariñas, Galicia
168	Burns Pit Disaster	1909 (16 February)	Mining disaster at Stanley, County Durham
167	Piper Alpha	1988 (6 July)	Oil platform gas leak, explosion and fire 30 m (98 ft) above cold seas in the North Sea
164	Seaham Colliery accident	1880 (8 September)	Mining accident at Seaham, County Durham
163	The John Bodkin Adams murders	1946–1956	Though controversially acquitted in court of the murder of a patient in 1957, Doctor John Bodkin Adams is widely suspected to have murdered around 163 of his patients over ten years
157	Deutschland	1875 (6 December)	Shipwrecked during a blizzard on Kentish Knock sandbank, Thames Estuary. Tugboat rescue delayed until the next day, most died of hypothermia
155	Minnie Pit disaster	1918 (12 January)	Mining disaster at Podmore Hall, Halmer End, Staffordshire
150	Clifford's Tower fire massacre	1190 (16 March)	Massacre of Jews in York by a mob
146	Risca colliery disasters	1860 (1 December)	Coal mining disaster at Black Vein Colliery Risca, Monmouthshire caused by a gas explosion
146	Dan-Air Flight 1008	1980 (25 April)	Air traffic control instructed the plane to fly an unpublished holding pattern, which led the plane into the dangerously high terrain of Mount Esperanza, Tenerife
146	Aberfan disaster	1966 (21 October)	Coal-waste spoil tip collapsed onto a junior school, Glamorganshire
143	Swaithe Main Colliery disaster	1875 (6 December)	Mining disaster at Worsbrough, Yorkshire
141	SS Berlin	1907 (21 February)	Great Eastern Railway steamship out of Harwich wrecked off Hook of Holland
140	HMS Condor	1901 (3 December)	Ship lost with all hands in a gale off Vancouver Island
140	2004 Indian Ocean earthquake and tsunami	2004 (26 December)	UK victims only; see Countries affected by the 2004 Indian Ocean earthquake
139	George III	1835 (12 April)	Convict ship wrecked in D'Entrecasteaux Channel, Tasmania
139	Combs Pit disaster	1893 (4 July)	Mining disaster at Thornhill, Yorkshire
137	National Shell Filling Factory explosion	1918 (1 July)	Munitions explosion at Chilwell in Nottinghamshire. Eight tons of TNT exploded
136	Wellington Pit disaster	1910 (11 May)	Coal mining disaster at Whitehaven, Cumberland
135	Fifth cholera pandemic	1893	The last outbreak of cholera in Britain took place in 1893
135	Alexander	1815 (27 March)	Ship out of Bombay wrecked near Portland within sight of shore. The ship was caught in a gale and ran aground at night
133	Amphitrite	1833 (31 August)	Convict ship from Woolwich to Australia wrecked off Boulogne
133	MV Princess Victoria	1953 (31 January)	Early roll-on/roll-off ferry disaster in the North Channel during a storm.
131	Lincoln typhoid fever epidemic	1904 (November) – 1905 (April)	
130	Rothsay Castle	1831 (18 August)	Paddle steamer from Liverpool shipwrecked in the Menai Strait under the command of a drunken captain.
129	John Franklin's Northwest Passage expedition	1845–1848	HMS Erebus and HMS Terror caught in pack ice; the crews endured botulism, lead poisoning and cannibalism before starvation.
128	TSMS Lakonia	1963 (22 December)	Caught fire and sank off Madeira. Resulted in 98 (mainly British) passenger deaths, plus 33 crew fatalities.
128	HMS Gladiator	1908 (25 April)	Shipwrecked in a collision with an American steamship during a snowstorm, Isle of Wight.
125	HMS Primrose	1809 (22 January)	Shipwrecked on The Manacles, Cornwall.
125	SS Hilda	1905 (18 November)	London & South Western Railway steamship wrecked in snow squalls off Saint-Malo.
124	BOAC Flight 911	1966 (5 March)	Aircraft broke up in flight near Mount Fuji, Japan. A significant percentage of the fatalities were American and Japanese citizens.
124	SS Daphne	1883 (3 July)	Capsized during her ship naming and launching, River Clyde, Glasgow.
123	Ocean Queen	1856 (February)	Clipper ship out of London disappeared in the Atlantic Ocean.
121	Dunbar	1857 (20 August)	Clipper out of Plymouth wrecked at Sydney Cove, Australia.
120	New Risca pit explosion	1880 (5 July)	Coal mining disaster, Risca, Monmouthshire.
120+	Bibighar Massacre	1857 (15 July)	Massacre of European women and children at Cawnpore (Kanpur), India during the Indian Rebellion of 1857.
119	National Colliery explosion	1905 (11 July)	Coal mine explosion at Wattstown, Rhondda Valley, Glamorganshire.
118	British European Airways Flight 548	1972 (18 June)	Crashed into a field at Staines. Possible heart attack suffered by the pilot after takeoff.
114	Cymmer Colliery explosion	1856 (15 July)	Coal mine explosion at Cymmer, Porth, Glamorganshire.
112	Parc Slip Colliery gas explosion	1892 (26 August)	Gas explosion due to a damaged Davy lamp, Tondu, Glamorganshire
112	SS Stella	1899 (30 March)	London & South Western Railway steamship wrecked on a granite reef in fog at full speed, sinking in eight minutes, at the Casquets, Channel Islands.
112	Harrow and Wealdstone rail crash	1952 (8 October)	Three trains collided in patchy fog in morning rush hour. Death toll second only to Quintinshill rail crash.
112	Dan-Air Flight 1903	1970 (3 July)	De Havilland Comet crashed into a mountain in Catalonia, Spain
111	Caledonian Airways Flight 153	1962 (4 March)	Crashed after take-off from Douala, Cameroon
110	RMS Amazon (1851)	1852 (4 January)	Steam engine of a wooden mail paddle steamer caught fire in the Bay of Biscay
109	Faversham gunpowder mill explosion	1916 (2 April)	
108	Invicta International Airlines Flight 435	1973 (10 April)	Crashed into a forested, snowy hillside near Hochwald, Switzerland
106	SS Mohegan	1898 (14 October)	Shipwrecked off The Manacles, Cornwall
104	William Pit disaster	1947 (15 August)	Coal mining disaster at Whitehaven, Cumberland
104	HMS Brazen	1800 (26 January)	Shipwrecked off Newhaven, Sussex.
102	Pelican	1793 (20 March)	Sank in the River Mersey.
102	HMS Feversham	1711 (7 October)	Shipwrecked off Scatarie Island, Louisbourg, Nova Scotia.
102	Wallsend Colliery explosion	1835 (18 June)	Colliery explosion, Wallsend, Northumberland.
101	Naval Steam Colliery explosion	1880 (10 December)	Colliery explosion, Tonypandy, Rhondda Valley. Four bodies unidentified.
100+	HMS Lizard	1748 (27 February)	Wrecked on the Seven Stones reef.
100 to 240	Windscale fire	1957 (10 October) (deaths up to decades later)	One of the world's worst nuclear accidents. Radioactive material released, causing many local cancer deaths in the long term. Number of deaths disputed.
100	"Battle" of May Island	1918 (31 January – 1 February)	Two Royal Navy submarines sunk after collisions during naval exercise
100	Moray Firth fishing disaster	1848 (19 August)	Open hulled fishing fleet storm disaster
100	HMS Confiance	1822 (21 September)	36-gun, 393 ton brig sloop was wrecked between Mizen Head and Three Castles Head, at the south-westernmost point of Ireland
100	Avalanche	1877 (11 September)	Ship out of London for Wellington, New Zealand, collided with American Forest Queen off Isle of Portland, English Channel, both sinking, with a further 20+ casualties from the Forest Queen

== Fewer than 100 fatalities ==
Deaths Italics indicate an estimated figure	Event	Year	Notes
99	Meikle Ferry disaster	1809 (16 August)	Over-laden ferryboat sank in Dornoch Firth, Scotland
99	HMS Thetis submarine disaster	1939 (1 June)	Flooded through torpedo tube during pre-war sea trials, Liverpool Bay, salvaged but sunk by depth charges with all hands in 1943
99	KLM flight 607-E	1958 (14 August)	A flight from Shannon, Ireland to Gander, Canada crashed under unknown circumstances off the coast of Galway.
98	Edmond	1850 (19 November)	A chartered passenger sailing vessel sunk at Edmond Point in Kilkee, County Clare with 216 on board
98	Britannia Airways Flight 105	1966 (1 September)	Britannia Airways Bristol Britannia G-ANBB from Luton Airport, aircrash at Ljubljana
97	Hillsborough Stadium Disaster	1989 (15 April)	97 men, women and 37 teenagers killed, police failures were the main cause of the tragedy in the United Kingdom's worst sporting disaster
95	Haswell Colliery explosion	1844 (28 September)	County Durham
95	"Fatal Vespers"	1623 (26 October)	Floor collapse at house in Blackfriars, London, being used as a chapel
94	Carlingford Lough disaster	1916 (3 November)	SS Connemara and a coalship SS Retriever collided and sank, Carlingford Lough, County Down
93	St Scholastica Day riot, Oxford	1355 (10–12 February)	A "town and gown" dispute over beer escalates over three days
92	Felling mine disaster, County Durham	1812 (25 May)	Firedamp explosion, ushers in safety lamps by George Stephenson and Humphry Davy
91	Carrick-on-Suir disaster	1799 (9 February)	Barge capsize under bridge, in Ireland
91	Cadeby Main pit disaster	1912 (9 July)	Two underground coal mine explosions at Cadeby, South Yorkshire
90	Lewisham rail crash	1957 (4 December)	Railway signals missed in the rush hour fog
88	Armagh rail disaster	1889 (12 June)	Ten runaway railway passenger cars on a Sunday School day trip
88	1967 Air Ferry DC-4 accident,	1967 (3 June)	Douglas C-54 G-APYK, from Kent International Airport, Mont Canigou, France
87	Morfa Mine, Port Talbot	1890 (10 March)	Glamorganshire, Colliery gas explosion
86	SS Egypt	1922 (20 May)	Shipwreck, off Ushant, Brittany
85	Rohilla	1914 (30 October)	Ran aground off Whitby, with a survivor of the sinking of the RMS Titanic two years earlier rescued again
84	British Eagle	1964 (29 February)	International Airlines aircrash Bristol Britannia G-AOVO from Heathrow Airport, Innsbruck, Austria,
84	Paisley canal disaster	1810 (10 November)	Canal pleasure boat capsize, Paisley, Scotland
83	East Side pit, Senghenydd	1901 (24 May)	Glamorganshire, Colliery gas explosion, precursor to the 1913 disaster
83	1961 President Airlines Douglas DC-6 crash	1961 (10 September)	The flight was taking off from Shannon Airport in Ireland, when it crashed into the river Shannon
81	Mardy Colliery, Rhondda Valley	1885 (23 December)	Glamorganshire, mining disaster
81	Easington Colliery	1951 (29 May)	County Durham, coal mine explosion,
81	Holmfirth Flood	1852 (5 February)	Bilberry Reservoir collapsed, Holme Valley, West Yorkshire
80+	PS Queen Victoria	1853 (15 February)	Wrecked below a lighthouse in a night-time snowstorm, off Howth Head, Dublin
80	Llandow air disaster	1950 (12 March)	Fairflight Avro Tudor G-AKBY, Sigginstone, Glamorganshire, with returning Welsh Rugby Union supporters on board (highest confirmed death toll of any civil aviation disaster to that date)
80	Creswell Colliery	1950 (26 September)	Mining accident caused by smoke inhalation, Creswell, Derbyshire
79	Great Yarmouth Suspension bridge	1846 (2 May)	Collapse above a river, killing children watching a clown
79	British Admiral	1874 (23 May)	The ship, out of Liverpool, wrecked off Tasmania
79	HMS Glatton	1918 (16 September)	Wrecked by accidental explosion, Dover harbour
79	Markham Colliery disaster	1938 (10 May)	Underground explosion Derbyshire
78	Burwell, Cambridgeshire Barn fire	1727 (8 September)	Occurred during a puppet show with the doors nailed shut
77	Ocean Home	1856 (5 September)	American ship sinks after collision with Cherubim off Lizard Point, Cornwall
77	Diglake Colliery Disaster	1895 (14 January)	Inrush of water into Diglake Colliery, North Staffordshire
76	Third plague pandemic	1896–1926	Series of outbreaks across Britain and Ireland as part of a pandemic, with Glasgow and Suffolk being particularly badly affected (the last death of plague in Britain occurred in 1926)
76	Maypole Colliery disaster	1908 (18 August)	Underground explosion at Abram, Lancashire
75	Tay Bridge disaster	1879 (28 December)	Cast iron bridge collapse with a train crossing during an evening storm, Dundee
75	HMS Affray	1951 (17 April)	Mysterious submarine disaster in English Channel
75	STV Royston Grange	1972 (11 May)	A Houlder Line cargo liner, destroyed by fire after a collision with Liberian-registered tanker Tien Chee in the Rio de la Plata
74	SS Naronic	1893 (19 February)	Lost at sea, possibly due to iceberg strike off Nova Scotia, out of Liverpool, with no Wireless Telegraph to make a distress call
73	Udston mining disaster	1887 (28 May)	Hamilton, Scotland, firedamp explosion
73	Silvertown explosion	1917 (19 January)	Explosion in a TNT factory in West Ham
72	Stockport Air Disaster	1967 (4 June)	British Midland Airways Argonaut G-ALHG, an unrecognised flaw in the fuel system made the plane returning from Mallorca uncontrollable.
72	Grenfell Tower fire	2017 (14 June)	Residential tower block in North Kensington, London
71	Glen Cinema Disaster	1929 (31 December)	Paisley, Scotland
70+	1900 English beer poisoning	1900	6,000 people poisoned by consuming arsenic-tainted beer, with Manchester being the worst affected area
70	Great Gale of 1871	1871 (10 February)	Bridlington 100 shipwrecks, incl. Royal National Lifeboat Harbinger, plus other losses at sea, estimated total of 70 marine fatalities
70	RAF Fauld	1944 (27 November)	Munitions explosion during World War II, Staffordshire Largest explosion on British soil.
69	HMS M1	1925 (12 November)	Submarine wreck in collision with Swedish surface vessel off Plymouth
69	Trimdon Grange colliery disaster	1882 (16 February)	Underground explosion in County Durham
67	September 11, 2001 attacks	2001 (11 September)	[UK victims only]
66	BEA Comet G-ARCO bombing	1967 (12 October)	Off Rhodes [all nationalities]
66	Ibrox disaster	1971 (2 January)	Compressive asphyxia spectator crush on stairway at Ibrox Park football stadium, Glasgow
65	Theatre Royal, Dunlop Street, Glasgow	1849 (17 February)	Panic ensuing from a false fire alarm
65	HMS Jasper	1817 (20 January)	The Cherokee-class brig-sloop wrecked in hurricane-force winds on either Rame Head, Cornwall or Bear's Head, Mount Batten, Devon
64	Middle Duffryn Mine	1852 (14 May)	Colliery explosion near Aberdare, Glamorganshire
64	Masbrough boat disaster	1841 (5 July)	John and William overturns on launch near Rotherham
64	HMS Truculent	1950 (12 January)	Submarine collision on the surface, Thames Estuary, survivors died of hypothermia on mid-winter mudbanks
63	British Airways Flight 576	1976 (10 September)	Mid-air collision with Inex-Adria Aviopromet Flight 550 above Zagreb, caused by ATC error
63	Peckfield Colliery Disaster	1896 (30 April)	Micklefield, Yorkshire
63	Victoria coal pit, Nitshill near Glasgow	1851 (15 March)	Explosion
63	Great Western Mine	1893 (11 April)	Rhondda Valley Colliery mining disaster, South Wales
63	BEA Flight 706 aircrash	1971 (2 October)	A Vickers Vanguard G-APEC flight 706, Aarsele, Belgium
63	Mauricewood Colliery disaster	1889 (5 September)	Underground fire, Penicuik, Scotland
63	Dinas Rhondda	1879 (13 January )	Colliery gas explosion at Llantrisant, Rhondda Valley, Glamorganshire
62	PS Comet	1825 (21 October)	Sank in collision off Gourock, Scotland
61	SS Thames	1841 (4 January)	Steamship shipwrecked in a night-time storm, Isles of Scilly
61	Freckleton Air Disaster	1944 (23 August)	A USAAF Consolidated B-24 Liberator heavy bomber crashed into a village school in a storm, Freckleton, Lancashire, (3 aircrew, 58 ground fatalities)
61	Aer Lingus flight 712	1968 (24 March)	The flight from Cork to London crashed mysteriously off the coast of Wexford likely due to a bird strike
60+	Harwich ferry disaster	1807 (18 April)	A 'grossly overladen' coastal vessel capsizes while transporting soldiers and their families
60	Dalhousie	1853 (October )	"Blackwall frigate" sank off Beachy Head
60	HMS M2	1932 (26 January)	The M-class submarine flooded through her Parnall Peto seaplane hangar doors, Lyme Bay
58	Wharncliffe Woodmoor Colliery	1936 (6 August)	Underground explosion caused by an electrical fault
58	Garland of Topsham	1649 (30 January)	A vessel carrying Charles I's possessions wrecked on Godrevy Island, Cornwall
57	Tylorstown	1896 (27 January)	Rhondda Valley Colliery mining disaster, South Wales
57	Sneyd Colliery Disaster	1942 (1 January)	Burslem, Staffordshire
57	HMS K5	1921 (24 January)	A submarine sank in deep water, 120 miles (190 km) southwest of the Isles of Scilly during sea trials
56	Bradford City stadium fire	1985 (11 May)	Bradford City A.F.C.'s Valley Parade stadium caught fire after a discarded cigarette set fire to rubbish underneath the wooden stands
56	7 July 2005 London bombings	2005 (7 July)	By suicide bombers on public transport
55	Manchester air disaster	1985 (22 August)	Flight 28M, a Boeing 737-236 engine fire before takeoff on a holiday flight to Corfu
53	Second Ferndale Colliery disaster	1869 (10 June)	Explosion in Rhondda Valley, Glamorganshire
53	Great fire of Newcastle and Gateshead	1854 (6 October)	Firestorm and explosion
52	Lletty Shenkin Colliery, Cwmbach	1849 (10 August)	Underground explosion, Aberdare, South Wales
52	Yellow fever outbreak, HMS Firebrand	1861 (July)	West Indies
52	Loch Ard	1878 (1 June)	A clipper out of Gravesend, Kent, wrecked off Loch Ard Gorge, just off the Shipwreck Coast of Victoria, Australia in thick fog
52	HMS Wasp	1884 (22 September)	Wrecked on Tory Island, County Donegal
52	Marine Colliery	1927 (1 March)	Gwm near Ebbw Vale, Monmouthshire, coal mine disaster
51	Colney Hatch Lunatic Asylum fire, London	1903 (27 January)	In an early psychiatric hospital holding up to 3,500 patients
51	Marchioness disaster, River Thames	1989 (20 August)	A pleasure boat rammed by a dredger under a bridge
51	St Hilda Colliery, South Shields, coal pit explosion	1839 (28 June)	
50+	Winter of 1962–63	1962–63	One of the coldest winters on record in the United Kingdom. The river Thames froze solid
50	Ariana Afghan Airlines Flight 701 aircrash	1969 (5 January)	Crashed into a house, Boeing 727 YA-FAR, Gatwick
50	Summerland fire disaster	1973 (2 August)	Douglas, Isle of Man, a fire in a leisure centre
50	Whiddy Island disaster	1979 (8 January)	Explosion of oil tanker Betelguese in Bantry Bay, Ireland
49?	SS Nile	1854 (30 November)	All the crew and passengers died when she hit The Stones reef off Godrevy Head, Cornwall; leading to building of the lighthouse
49	Booth's clothing factory fire, Huddersfield	1941 (31 October)	Fire at a major clothing factory in Huddersfield, West Riding of Yorkshire
49	HMS Punjabi collision with the battleship HMS King George V	1942 (1 May)	Sinking 469 miles (755 km) northwest of Shetland.
49	Hither Green rail crash	1967 (5 November )	In London, a broken rail caused derailment of an express train
48	Stardust fire	1981 (14 February)	A nightclub fire in Artane, Dublin, 841 people had attended a disco there, of whom 48 died and 214 were injured as a result of the fire
48	A British Eagle International Airlines Vickers Viscount	1968 (9 August)	En route from London to Innsbruck, Austria, breaks up in mid-air over Bavaria
47	Burns' Day Storm	1990 (25 January)	Violent storm that started on Burns' day and affected northwestern Europe, hurricane-force winds in some areas
47	Emma	1828 (29 February)	Capsizes after launching, Mersey and Irwell Navigation, Manchester
47	Gethin Pit disaster	1862 (19 February)	First of two underground colliery explosions at Abercanaid, near Merthyr Tydfil. South Wales
47	R101 airship crash	1930 (5 October)	Beauvais, France
47	SS Samtampa	1947( 23 April)	Wrecked off Sker Point in the Bristol Channel (death toll includes 8 crew of Mumbles lifeboat)
47	Auchengeich coal mining disaster	1959 (18 September)	Auchinloch, Lanarkshire, Scotland
47	Kegworth Air Disaster	1989 (8 January)	British Midland Flight 92, Leicestershire, the pilot shut down the wrong engine (just missed the M1 Motorway)
47	1973 Nantes mid-air collision	1973 (5 March)	[British victims only] Two aircraft heading to Heathrow Airport collided due to ATC error.
46	Wreck of Confederate States of America blockade runner PS Lelia	1865 (14 January)	(39 fatalities) and lifeboat crew (7 fatalities) in Liverpool Bay
45	Bentley Coal mine disaster	1931 (20 November)	Bentley, South Yorkshire
45	Six Bells Colliery Disaster	1960 (28 June)	Aberbeeg, Monmouthshire
45	Aquila Airways Short Solent flying boat crash	1957 (15 November)	Isle of Wight
45	Sumburgh disaster	1986 (6 November)	A Brent oilfield CH-47 Chinook helicopter crashed at sea
45	PS Nimrod	1860 (28 February)	An Irish steamer sank off St David's Head
45	Cleggan Bay Disaster	1927 (27 October)	A strong gale killed 45 fishermen off the coast of County Galway
44	R38 (ZR-2) airship crash	1921 (24 August)	River Humber, near Hull
44	MV Derbyshire	1980 (9 September)	Bibby Line bulk carrier sank during Typhoon Orchid, south of Japan (by tonnage the largest UK-flagged ship loss)
43	Croydon typhoid outbreak of 1937	1937 (October–December)	Outbreak originating from a polluted chalk water well; 341 cases
43	Bourne End rail crash	1945 (30 September)	Derailment taking crossover at speed near Hemel Hempstead, Hertfordshire; driver had worked for 26 consecutive days
43	Moorgate tube crash	1975 (28 February)	London Underground train runs at speed into dead-end tunnel in the morning rush hour
41	Little Baldon air crash	1965 (6 July)	Handley Page Hastings aircraft crashed at Little Baldon, Oxfordshire, during parachute training flight from RAF Abingdon, caused by metal fatigue
40	Garden Pit Disaster	1844 (14 February)	40 men and boys are crushed or drowned when water from the River Cleddau broke through the roof of their coalmine at Landshipping, Pembrokeshire, Wales
40	Regent's Park skating disaster	1867 (15 January)	Ice covering the boating lake collapsed and 200 people plunged in
40	Low Moor Explosion	1916 (21 August)	Explosion at a picric acid plant producing explosives for the war effort in the First World War

== See also ==
- List of accidents and disasters by death toll (worldwide)
- List of accidents and incidents involving commercial aircraft
- List of disasters in Antarctica by death toll
- List of disasters in Australia by death toll
- List of disasters in Canada by death toll
- List of disasters in Croatia by death toll
- List of disasters in Germany by death toll
- List of disasters in New Zealand by death toll
- List of disasters in Poland by death toll
- List of disasters in Ukraine by death toll
- List of disasters in the United States by death toll
- List of fires
- List of lifeboat disasters in Britain and Ireland
- List of natural disasters in the British Isles
- List of rail accidents in the United Kingdom
- List of rail accidents (worldwide)
- List of riots
- List of terrorist incidents
- List of train accidents by death toll
- Lists of shipwrecks
- United Kingdom casualties of war
