= 1896 in the United Kingdom =

Events from the year 1896 in the United Kingdom.

== Incumbents ==
- Monarch – Victoria
- Prime Minister – Robert Gascoyne-Cecil, 3rd Marquess of Salisbury (Coalition)

== Events ==
- January – Fourth Anglo-Ashanti War: British redcoats enter the Ashanti capital, Kumasi, and Asantehene Agyeman Prempeh I is deposed.
- 2 January – the Jameson Raid comes to an end as Jameson surrenders to the Boers.
- 6 January – Cecil Rhodes resigns as Premier of Cape Colony over the Jameson Raid.
- 10 January – American-born Birt Acres demonstrates his film projector, the Kineopticon, the first in Britain, to the Lyonsdown Photographic Club in New Barnet, the first film show to an audience in the U.K.
- 14 January – Acres demonstrates his Kineopticon to the Royal Photographic Society at the Queen's Hall in London.
- 16 January – Devonport High School for Boys is founded in Plymouth.
- 28 January
  - In an underground explosion at Tylorstown Colliery, Rhondda, 57 miners are killed.
  - Engineer Walter Arnold of the Arnold (automobile) company of East Peckham in Kent receives the U.K.'s first speeding conviction for travelling at 8 mph (13 km/h) in a motorised vehicle, thereby exceeding the contemporary speed limit for towns of 2 mph (3.2 km/h).
- 20 February – in London:
  - Robert W. Paul demonstrates his film projector, the Theatrograph (later known as the Animatograph), at the Alhambra Theatre.
  - The Lumiere Brothers first project their films in Britain, at the Empire Theatre of Varieties, Leicester Square.
- 12 March – Salisbury orders a military campaign to combat increasing French influence in the Sudan.
- 29 March – the Royal College of St Patrick, Maynooth in Ireland is granted the status of pontifical university by charter of the Holy See.
- 6 April – the Snowdon Mountain Railway commences public operation; however, a derailment leading to one fatality causes services to be suspended for a year.
- 6–15 April – Great Britain and Ireland compete at the Olympics and win 2 gold, 3 silver and 2 bronze medals.
- 16 April – the National Trust acquires (for £10) its first building for preservation, and its first property in England, Alfriston Clergy House in East Sussex.
- 21 April – Royal Victorian Order instituted.
- 23 April – Blackpool Pleasure Beach amusement park established.
- 30 April – Peckfield Colliery disaster in Micklefield, Yorkshire: an underground explosion kills 63 men and boys and 19 pit ponies.
- 4 May – Daily Mail newspaper founded.
- 8 May – in cricket, Yorkshire sets a still-standing County Championship record when they accumulate an innings total of 887 against Warwickshire.
- 18–20 May – Newlyn riots: protests by fishermen at Newlyn, Cornwall, against those from Lowestoft and elsewhere fishing on Sabbath, leading to military intervention.
- 7 June – Mahdist War: British and Egyptian victory at the Battle of Ferkeh.
- 12 June – Jack (J. T.) Hearne sets a record for the earliest date of taking 100 wickets. It is equalled by Charlie Parker in 1931.
- 26 July–1 August – International Socialist Workers and Trade Union Congress held in London.
- 17 August
  - Bridget Driscoll becomes the first person in the world to be killed in a car accident, in the grounds of The Crystal Palace.
  - Start of development of Trafford Park, Manchester, pioneering example of a planned industrial estate in England.
- 27 August
  - The shortest war in recorded history, the Anglo-Zanzibar War, starts at 9 in the morning and lasts for 45 minutes of shelling.
  - Britain establishes a Protectorate over Ashanti concluding the Fourth Anglo-Ashanti War.
- 15 September – Pope Leo XIII issues the papal bull Apostolicae curae, declaring all Anglican ordinations to be "absolutely null and utterly void".
- 22 September – Queen Victoria surpasses her grandfather King George III as the longest reigning monarch in British history up to this date.
- 23 September – Kitchener captures Dongola in the Sudan.
- 30 September–August 1897: Lock-out of Welsh slate workers at Penrhyn Quarry.

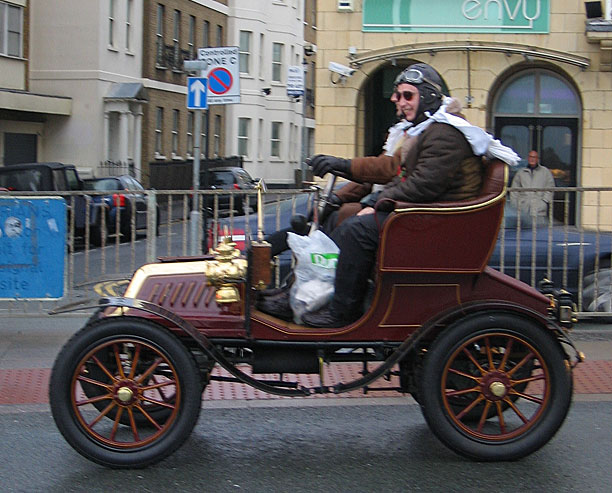
London to Brighton Veteran Car Run recreating the 1896 'Emancipation Run'

- 14 November – the Locomotives on Highways Act (of 14 August) comes into effect, raising the speed limit for road vehicles from 4 to 14 mph and removing the requirement for a man to walk in front of an automobile to give warning. To celebrate this, an 'Emancipation Run' of cars from London to Brighton (continuing afterwards as the London to Brighton Veteran Car Run) is held. By this date, Thomas Humber's car factory in Coventry has become the first in Britain to begin series production.
- 4–5 December – a storm hits Brighton, destroying the old Chain Pier (closed October) and badly damaging the other piers and the new Brighton and Rottingdean Seashore Electric Railway (opened 28 November).
- 11 December – William Preece introduces Guglielmo Marconi's work in wireless telegraphy to the general public at a lecture, "Telegraphy without Wires", at the Toynbee Hall in London.
- 14 December – Glasgow Subway, the third oldest metro system in the world (after the London Underground and the Budapest Metro), begins operations in Glasgow.
- 17 December – Hereford earthquake.

=== Undated ===
- Completion of the first flats in the London County Council's Boundary Estate in the East End of London, the country's earliest public housing scheme, replacing part of the notorious Old Nichol slum.
- The Arts and Crafts movement house Munstead Wood in Surrey is designed by architect Edwin Lutyens for garden designer Gertrude Jekyll, his first major commission and the start of an influential partnership.

== Publications ==
- Hilaire Belloc's verse collection The Bad Child's Book of Beasts.
- Joseph Conrad's novel An Outcast of the Islands.
- Marie Corelli's novels The Mighty Atom, The Murder of Delicia and Ziska.
- A. E. Housman's poetry collection A Shropshire Lad.
- W. W. Jacobs' short story collection Many Cargoes.
- William Morris's fantasy novel The Well at the World's End.
- Arthur Morrison's social realist novella A Child of the Jago.
- Robert Louis Stevenson's unfinished historical novel Weir of Hermiston (posthumous).
- H. G. Wells' science fiction novel The Island of Doctor Moreau.

== Births ==
- 7 January – Arnold Ridley, actor and playwright (died 1984)
- 25 January - John Moores, businessman and owner of the Littlewoods empire (died 1993)
- 14 February – Edward Arthur Milne, astrophysicist and mathematician (died 1950)
- 3 May – Dodie Smith, novelist and playwright (died 1990)
- 7 May
  - John Dunville, army officer, Victoria Cross recipient (died of wounds 1917)
  - Kathleen McKane Godfree, tennis and badminton player (died 1992)
- 29 May – Doreen Knatchbull, Baroness Brabourne, aristocrat and socialite (died 1979)
- 1 June – Sydney Kyte, bandleader (died 1981)
- 6 June – Henry Allingham, became the oldest surviving British veteran of the First World War and briefly the world's oldest man (died 2009)
- 19 June
  - R. Palme Dutt, communist theoretician (died 1974)
  - Wallis Warfield, later Duchess of Windsor, American wife of the Duke of Windsor (died in France 1986)
- 25 June – Alfred Anderson, Scottish joiner and veteran of the First World War (died 2005)
- 28 July – Guy Salisbury-Jones, Army major-general (died 1985)
- 28 July – Joyce Bishop, educator (died 1993)
- 19 July – A. J. Cronin, Scottish novelist (died 1981)
- 14 August – Albert Ball, flying ace (killed in action 1917)
- 14 October – Bud Flanagan, comedian and singer (died 1968)
- 16 November – Oswald Mosley, leader of the British Union of Fascists (died 1980)
- 17 November – Sophie Catherine Theresa Mary Peirce-Evans, later Mary, Lady Heath, aviator and athlete (died 1939)
- 15 December – Miles Dempsey, general (died 1969)

== Deaths ==
- 8 January – Colin Blackburn, Baron Blackburn, judge (born 1813)
- 17 January – Augusta Hall, Baroness Llanover, Welsh patron of the arts (born 1802)
- 19 January – Bernhard Gillam, political cartoonist (born 1856)
- 25 January – Frederic Leighton, 1st Baron Leighton, painter and sculptor specialising in classical subjects (born 1830)
- 14 February – George Selwyn Marryat, fly fisherman (born 1840)
- 10 June – Amelia Dyer, baby farm murderer (born 1837; hanged)
- 23 June – Sir Joseph Prestwich, geologist (born 1812)
- 7 July – Charles Thomas Wooldridge, soldier and uxoricide commemorated in Oscar Wilde's The Ballad of Reading Gaol (born 1866; hanged)
- 23 July – Caroline Martyn, Christian socialist and trade unionist (born 1867)
- 12 August – Sir Harry Lumsden, general (born 1821)
- 13 August – Sir John Everett Millais, painter (born 1829)
- 18 August – Frederick Nicholls Crouch, composer and cellist (born 1808)
- 2 May – Emma Darwin, née Wedgwood, wife of Charles Darwin (died 1896)
- 3 October – William Morris, artist, writer and socialist (born 1834)
- 6 October – Sir James Abbott, army officer and colonial administrator in British India (born 1807)
- 8 October – George du Maurier, cartoonist and novelist (born 1834 in France)
- 11 October – Edward White Benson, Archbishop of Canterbury (born 1829)
- 21 October – James Henry Greathead, engineer and inventor (born 1844 in South Africa)
- November – Margaret Eleanor Parker, social activist, first president of the British Women's Temperance Association (born 1827)
- 26 November – Coventry Patmore, poet (born 1823)
- 10 December – Sir Alexander Milne, 1st Baronet, admiral of the fleet (born 1806)

== See also ==
- List of British films before 1920
