= List of shipwrecks in July 1841 =

The list of shipwrecks in July 1841 includes ships sunk, foundered, wrecked, grounded, or otherwise lost during July 1841.

== 1 July ==
List of shipwrecks: 1 July 1841
Ship	State	Description
Caledonian	United Kingdom	The ship was driven ashore and wrecked at Lawler's Cove, Newfoundland, British North America. She was on a voyage from Kingston upon Hull to Quebec City, Province of Canada, British North America.
Velocity	United Kingdom	The ship was driven ashore and wrecked at St. Shott's, Newfoundland. She was on a voyage from Quebec City to Portaferry, County Down.

== 2 July ==
List of shipwrecks: 2 July 1841
Ship	State	Description
Rose Ann	United Kingdom	The brig foundered in the North Sea 30 nautical miles (56 km) off Flamborough Head, Yorkshire. She was on a voyage from Sunderland, County Durham to London.

== 3 July ==
List of shipwrecks: 3 July 1841
Ship	State	Description
Rosina	United Kingdom	The brig sprang a leak and foundered off the Dudgeon Lightship ( Trinity House). Her eight crew survived.

== 4 July ==
List of shipwrecks: 4 July 1841
Ship	State	Description
Dove	United Kingdom	The ship ran aground on the Pakefield Flats, in the North Sea off the coast of Suffolk. She was on a voyage from Exeter to Lowestoft, Suffolk. Dove was refloated and taken into Lowestoft.
Monmouth	United Kingdom	The ship ran aground on the Goodwin Sands, Kent. She was on a voyage from Newcastle upon Tyne, Northumberland to Exmouth, Devon. Monmouth was refloated and resumed her voyage.

== 5 July ==
List of shipwrecks: 5 July 1841
Ship	State	Description
John and William	United Kingdom	Masbrough boat disaster: The ship was launched sideways at Masbrough, Yorkshire. People on board all went to the river side of the vessel, causing it to heel and throwing many of them into the River Don. Sixty-four of them were drowned.
Rose	United Kingdom	The ship ran aground and was severely damaged at Lowestoft, Suffolk. She was refloated the next day.

== 6 July ==
List of shipwrecks: 6 July 1841
Ship	State	Description
Elmina	Netherlands	The ship was wrecked on the coast of Africa. Her crew were rescued. She was on a voyage from Amsterdam, North Holland to an African port.

== 7 July ==
List of shipwrecks: 7 July 1841
Ship	State	Description
Betsey	United Kingdom	The ship capsized near Neath, Glamorgan. She was righted the next day.
Criterion	United Kingdom	The ship ran aground on the Brambles, in the Solent. She was on a voyage from Newcastle upon Tyne, Northumberland to Barcelona, Spain. Criterion was later refloated.

== 8 July ==
List of shipwrecks: 8 July 1841
Ship	State	Description
Beleck Castle	United Kingdom	The schooner foundered in the Baltic Sea off Bornholm, Denmark. Her six crew survived. She was on a voyage from Stettin to Harwich, Essex.

== 9 July ==
List of shipwrecks: 9 July 1841
Ship	State	Description
Broderick	United Kingdom	The ship was driven ashore near Gothenburg, Sweden. She was on a voyage from Riga, Russia to Portsmouth, Hampshire. Broderick was refloated and taken into Gothenburg for repairs.
Iduna	Sweden	The ship was driven ashore on Gräsö. She was on a voyage from Gävle to New York, United States. Iduna was later refloated.
Wikingen	Flag unknown	The ship was wrecked on the Domesnes Reef, off the coast of Norway. Her crew were rescued. She was on a voyage from Torrevecchia Teatino, Kingdom of the Two Sicilies to a Baltic port.

== 10 July ==
List of shipwrecks: 10 July 1841
Ship	State	Description
Norfolk	United Kingdom	The schooner capsized in the North Sea off Winterton-on-Sea, Norfolk with the loss of one of the seven people on board.
Voorwarts	Netherlands	The ship was abandoned in the Atlantic Ocean. Her crew were rescued by Rothschild (United Kingdom). Voorwarts was on a voyage from New York, United States to Rotterdam, South Holland.

== 11 July ==
List of shipwrecks: 11 July 1841
Ship	State	Description
Eliza	United Kingdom	The schooner foundered in the Bristol Channel off Lundy Island, Devon. Her crew were rescued.
Ewell Grove	United Kingdom	The ship ran aground in the Hooghly River. She was on a voyage from Calcutta, India to London. Ewell Grove was refloated and put back to Calcutta.
Good Hope	United Kingdom	The ship was driven ashore in Red Wharf Bay. She was on a voyage from Whitehaven, Cumberland to Cardiff, Glamorgan.
Governor Douglas	United States	The ship was driven ashore in the Mississippi River downstream of New Orleans, Louisiana.

== 12 July ==
List of shipwrecks: 12 July 1841
Ship	State	Description
Janet	United Kingdom	The brig capsized at New York, United States.

== 13 July ==
List of shipwrecks: 13 July 1841
Ship	State	Description
Glanmalier	United Kingdom	The ship was driven ashore south of San Antonio, Chile. She was on a voyage from Sydney, New South Wales to Valparaíso, Chile. She was consequently condemned.
Henry Hoyle	United Kingdom	The ship was wrecked in Whirlpool Reach, off South Australia.
Mary	United Kingdom	The ship ran aground on a reef off Point Placentia, British Honduras. She was on a voyage from Belize City to Omoa. Mary was later refloated and put back to Belize.

== 14 July ==
List of shipwrecks: 14 July 1841
Ship	State	Description
Commissioner Barclay	United States	The ship was wrecked on Inagua, Bahamas.

== 16 July ==
List of shipwrecks: 16 July 1841
Ship	State	Description
Lord Cochrane	United Kingdom	The ship struck a sunken rock in Labrador Bay. She was abandoned on 18 July.

== 17 July ==
List of shipwrecks: 17 July 1841
Ship	State	Description
Antioch	United States	The full-rigged ship was wrecked near "Port Jolly", Nova Scotia, British North America. Her crew were rescued.
Jeune Théodore	Haiti	The ship was wrecked on the Silver Keys. Her crew were rescued. She was on a voyage from New York, United States to Port-au-Prince.
Tremont	United Kingdom	The ship was driven ashore on Saltholm, Denmark. She was on a voyage from Liverpool, Lancashire to Saint Petersburg, Russia. Tremont was later refloated and resumed her voyage.

== 18 July ==
List of shipwrecks: 18 July 1841
Ship	State	Description
Junge Ann	Bremen	The ship was wrecked in the Weser. She was on a voyage from Hamburg to Bremen.

== 19 July ==
List of shipwrecks: 19 July 1841
Ship	State	Description
India	United Kingdom	The ship was destroyed by fire in the South Atlantic. with the loss of eighteen of the 214 people on board. Survivors were rescued by a French whaler. She was on a voyage from Greenock, Renfrewshire to Sydney, New South Wales.
Isabella	United Kingdom	The ship was in collision with Isabella (United Kingdom) and foundered 20 nautical miles (37 km) east of Inchcape, Forfarshire. Her crew were rescued. She was on a voyage from Newcastle upon Tyne, Northumberland to Cullen, Morayshire.
Mary Ann	United Kingdom	The ship sprang a leak and was beached at Milford Haven, Pembrokeshire. She was on a voyage from Saundersfoot, Pembrokeshire to Drogheda, County Louth.
Sarah	United Kingdom	The ship was driven ashore and wrecked at Holyhead, Anglesey. She was on a voyage from Wicklow to Liverpool, Lancashire.

== 20 July ==
List of shipwrecks: 20 July 1841
Ship	State	Description
Bellona	United Kingdom	The ship was driven ashore at Helsingør, Denmark. She was on a voyage from Alloa, Clackmannanshire to Narva, Russia.
Cygnet	United Kingdom	The ship was wrecked on the Southampton Reef. All on board were rescued. She was on a voyage from Nassau, Bahamas to the Turks Islands.
Eugene	France	The ship was abandoned in the Atlantic Ocean. Her crew were rescued. She was on a voyage from Marseille, Bouches-du-Rhône to Rouen, Seine-Inférieure.
John Barry	(United Kingdom of Great Britain and Ireland) New South Wales	The ship was damaged in a typhoon at Hong Kong. Subsequently hulked.
Pilot	United Kingdom	The ship was holed by a rock in the Sound of Mull and was beached at Tobermory, Isle of Mull.
Swan	United Kingdom	The ship was holed by an anchor and sank at Sunderland, County Durham.

== 21 July ==
List of shipwrecks: 21 July 1841
Ship	State	Description
Calcutta	Sweden	The ship was driven ashore at Hong Kong.
Courier	France	The ship was in collision with Brankenmoor (United Kingdom) in the English Channel off St. Alban's Head, Dorset, United Kingdom and was abandoned. Her crew were rescued by Brankenmoor. Courier was subsequently taken into Cowes, Isle of Wight, United Kingdom.
Franjee Cowajee	Flag Unknown	The ship was driven ashore at Hong Kong.
James Laing	United Kingdom	The ship was wrecked at Hong Kong with the loss of ten of the 21 people on board.
Jane	United Kingdom	The brig was wrecked at Hong Kong.
Judith and Esther	United Kingdom	The ship was driven ashore in the Chandelier Islands. She was on a voyage from Jamaica to New Orleans, Louisiana, United States.
HMS Louisa	Royal Navy	The cutter was wrecked on "Kowlaon Island" with the loss of a crew member. There were 24 survivors. She was on a voyage from Macau to Hong Kong.
Manly	United Kingdom	The ship was driven ashore at Hong Kong. She was later refloated.
Prince George	United Kingdom	The transport ship was wrecked at Hong Kong. Her crew were rescued.
Rose	United Kingdom	The schooner foundered off Grand Ladrone, Hong Kong.
Snarley Yow	Flag unknown	The schooner was lost off Hong Kong.
St. Mungo	United Kingdom	The ship was driven ashore at Hong Kong. She was later refloated.
Sulphur	United Kingdom	The ship was driven ashore at Hong Kong.
Sylph	United Kingdom	The schooner was wrecked on Lintin, Hong Kong.

== 22 July ==
List of shipwrecks: 22 July 1841
Ship	State	Description
James Matthewson	United Kingdom	The brig was driven ashore and wrecked at Fremantle, Swan River Colony. All on board were rescued. She was on a voyage from London to the Swan River Colony.

== 24 July ==
List of shipwrecks: 24 July 1841
Ship	State	Description
Chandler Price	United States	The ship was driven ashore at Gibraltar. She was on a voyage from Trieste to New York. ChandlerPrice was refloated with assistance from HMS Jaseur (Royal Navy) and resumed her voyage.
Unnamed	Sweden	The barque was in collision with the barque John (Russia) off the Goodwin Sands, Kent, United Kingdom and foundered with the loss of eight of her eleven crew. Survivors were rescued by John.
Mary Ann	United Kingdom	The schooner sprang a leak and foundered in Freshwater Bay, Pembrokeshire. Her crew survived. She was on a voyage from Saundersfoot, Pembrokeshire to Drogheda, County Louth.
Ringwood	United Kingdom	The ship ran aground and capsized at Sheerness, Kent. She was righted the next day.

== 25 July ==
List of shipwrecks: 25 July 1841
Ship	State	Description
Aigle	France	The ship ran aground off Cape de Plata, Spain and was damaged. She was on a voyage from Marseille, Bouches-du-Rhône to Dunkerque, Nord. Aigle was refloated and was escorted into Gibraltar by HMS Jaseur (Royal Navy).
Jeune Leonie	France	The ship ran aground on the Barrow Sand, in the North Sea off the coast of Essex, United Kingdom. She was on a voyage from Seaham, County Durham, United Kingdom to Bordeaux, Gironde. Jeune Leonie was refloated and taken into Sheerness, Kent, United Kingdom for repairs.
Mary Ann	United Kingdom	The ship was driven ashore at Milford Haven, Pembrokeshire.

== 27 July ==
List of shipwrecks: 27 July 1841
Ship	State	Description
Dalkeith	United Kingdom	The ship was driven ashore on Green Island. She was on a voyage from Smyrna, Ottoman Empire to Dublin. She was refloated and resumed her voyage.
Feudon	France	The ship was wrecked on the coast of Madagascar. Her crew were rescued.
Princess Royal	United Kingdom	The ship was driven ashore at Cap Granitola, Sicily. She was on a voyage from Malta to Trapani, Sicily. Princess Royal was refloated on 18 August and taken into Marsala.

== 28 July ==
List of shipwrecks: 28 July 1841
Ship	State	Description
Eagle	United Kingdom	The ship ran aground on the Scotstown Reef and was damaged. She was on a voyage from Liverpool, Lancashire to Peterhead, Aberdeenshire. Eagle was refloated on 30 July and taken into Peterhead.
Memnon	United Kingdom	The ship was wrecked at South Shields, County Durham. Her crew were rescued. She was on a voyage from South Shields to Liverpool.
Othello	Flag unknown	The galiot was wrecked on the Longsand, in the North Sea off the coast of Essex, United Kingdom. Her crew were rescued by a fishing smack.
Picardie	France	The brig sprang a leak and was abandoned in the Atlantic Ocean (42°06′N 2°04′W) with the loss of two of her crew. Survivors were rescued by the brig Marianne (France), which lost two of her crew in the rescue. Picardie was on a voyage from Marseille, Bouches-du-Rhône to Abbeville, Somme.
Sarah	United Kingdom	The ship was driven ashore at Holyhead, Anglesey. Her crew were rescued.
Swan	United Kingdom	The steamship was holed by an anchor and sank at Sunderland, County Durham. Her crew survived.
Triumph	United Kingdom	The ship was wrecked on the South Sandy Island Reef, off the coast of Antigua. She was on a voyage from Greenock, Renfrewshire to Saint Lucia and Antigua.

== 29 July ==
List of shipwrecks: 29 July 1841
Ship	State	Description
Dorothea Maria	Sweden	The ship ran aground off "Hauerviig". She was on a voyage from Antwerp, Belgium to Nyköping.
Levant	United Kingdom	The ship ran aground in the Mississippi River.
Louise	United Kingdom	The ship was wrecked on the North Spit, in Liverpool Bay. She was on a voyage from Antwerp, Belgium to Liverpool, Lancashire. Louise was refloated but foundered in the Beggar's Patch.
Napoleon	United Kingdom	The ship was wrecked at the mouth of the Bento with the loss of three of her crew.

== 30 July ==
List of shipwrecks: 30 July 1841
Ship	State	Description
Cutter	United States	The barque was driven ashore and wrecked at Sandy Hook, New Jersey. Her crew were rescued. She was on a voyage from Pernambuco, Brazil to New York.

== Unknown date ==
List of shipwrecks: Unknown date in July 1841
Ship	State	Description
Bon Homme	France	The ship was wrecked off Nassau, Bahamas. Her crew were rescued. She was on a voyage from Saint Domingo to Marseille, Bouches-du-Rhône.
Dalkeith	United Kingdom	The ship was driven ashore on Green Island. She was on a voyage from Smyrna, Ottoman Empire to Dublin. Dalkeith was refloated with assistance from HMS Thunderer (Royal Navy) and resumed her voyage.
Emilie Caille	France	The ship was wrecked in the Nunez River, Africa before 13 July.
Era	United Kingdom	The ship ran aground off Copenhagen, Denmark. She was on a voyage from the Clyde to Stettin. Era was refloated on 3 July.
Good Hope	United Kingdom	The ship ran aground on the Tongue Sand, in the North Sea off the coast of Kent. She was refloated on 22 July and anchored off Margate, Kent.
Heron	United Kingdom	The ship was wrecked at Port Jolly, Nova Scotia, British North America before 26 July. She was on a voyage from Cienfuegos, Cuba to Halifax, Nova Scotia.
Isabella	United Kingdom	The ship was driven ashore at Mundesley, Norfolk. She was refloated on 9 July and taken into Great Yarmouth, Norfolk.
Margarets	United Kingdom	The sloop was abandoned on the Boston Knock, in the North Sea on or before 28 July. She was taken into Boston, Lincolnshire by HMRC Hind ( Board of Customs).
Marie Louise	France	The schooner ran aground on the Shipwash Sand, in the North Sea off the coast of Essex, United Kingdom. She was refloated but ran aground on the Long Sand. She was refloated with assistance from Aurora's Increase, Atalanta (both United Kingdom) and HMRC Scout ( Board of Customs).
Mary Paul	United Kingdom	The ship was wrecked in the Little Scarcies River before 13 July.
Moncton	United Kingdom	The ship was driven ashore at "Skagve". She was on a voyage from Stettin to Goole, Yorkshire. She was later refloated and put into Randers, Denmark.
Norris Stanley	United Kingdom	The ship was wrecked off Martinique before 20 July.
Vier Gebruders	Belgium	The ship was driven ashore on "Stoneskar" and was abandoned by her crew. She was on a voyage from Narva, Russia to Antwerp. Vier Gebruders was later refloated and taken into Reval, Russia for repairs.
