= Haig Colliery =

Closed coal mine in Cumbria, England

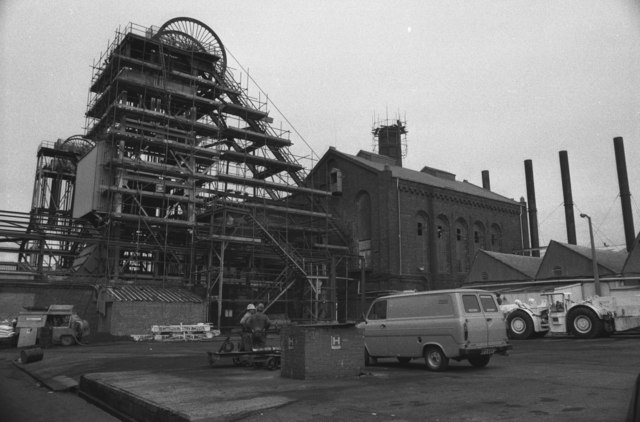
- Haig Colliery in 1983

- Location in Copeland Borough Location in Cumbria
- Location: Whitehaven, Cumbria, England; 54.542957°N 3.597768°W
- Products: Coal ([high volatile general purpose bituminous])
- Production: 300,000 tonnes (300,000 long tons; 330,000 short tons) per year (average)
- Type: Underground/under-sea
- Opened: 1916
- Closed: 1986
- Company: Whitehaven Colliery Company (on opening); British Coal (at closure)

Haig Colliery was a coal mine in Whitehaven, Cumbria, in north-west England. The mine was in operation for almost 70 years and produced high volatile strongly caking general purpose coal which was used in the local iron making industry, gas making and domestic fires. In later years, following closure of Workington Steelworks in 1980, it was used in electricity generation at Fiddler's Ferry. Situated on the coast, the underground workings of the mine spread westwards out under the Irish Sea and mining was undertaken at over 4 miles (6.4 km) out underneath the sea bed.

== History ==
The shafts were sunk between 1914 and 1918 as new access to Wellington Pit with some production starting in 1919, and full production not starting until 1925. The mine was named after Douglas Haig, the First World War commander. This followed a typical pattern of naming pits after famous figures of the day in Cumbria (Ladysmith after the battle and Wellington after the former Prime Minister).

The new sinking was connected to the existing workings of Wellington Colliery in 1922 and the two mines worked in conjunction with each other until Wellington closed in 1932. Initially Haig was operated by the Bord and pillar method, with Longwall mining taking over from the late 1930s.

== Operations ==
The mine's shafts were named Nos. 4 and 5 - Nos. 1, 2 and 3 shafts being the Wellington Pit located closer to Whitehaven Harbour. Shaft No. 4, sunk 1916-18, was 1200 feet deep and 18 feet in diameter. No. 5 shaft was sunk 1914-16, but the winding gear and steam engine were not installed until 1920-1921 and its shaft was slightly wider at 21 feet in diameter. The engines powering both shafts were built by Bever Dorling of Bradford. Initially, No. 4 shaft was used to transport everything in and out of the mine, but when No. 5 shaft was fitted out (following re-organisation of ventilation in 1933), all coal came via that shaft with No. 4 being used for man-riding and materials. The mine extended out across the Saltom Bay area of the Irish Sea for almost 5 miles (8.0 km).

In the almost 70 years that Haig was in production, it brought 48,000,000 tonnes (47,000,000 long tons; 53,000,000 short tons) of coal to the surface. The winders were limited to 6 tonnes (5.9 long tons; 6.6 short tons) capacity, which meant that on average, the mine only produced 700,000 tonnes (690,000 long tons; 770,000 short tons) per annum.

== Accidents ==
The collieries around Whitehaven, and Haig in particular, were noted for their prevalence to Firedamp (Methane). Between 1922 and 1931, 79 men died as a result of three explosions (in 1922, 1928 and 1931).

The 5 September 1922 explosion was caused by a pocket of gas being ignited. The day before, gas had been reported in the Six Quarters Seam of the mine, and the deputy in charge, William Weightman, descended to assess the situation with a shot-firer. Weightman approved the shot-firer to go ahead and deploy his shot which ignited the gas in that area of the mine. Just before 9:00 am, the banksman of the mine noted a cloud of dust rising up No. 4 shaft and Mines rescue were called out. In all, 39 men died in the explosion with all bodies being recovered by 10 September. Identification of the bodies was difficult because of damage to the miners faces; one had to be identified by his belt and trousers because his face was so disfigured.

An explosion occurred on 13 December 1927 which killed four men. On 9 February 1928, efforts were made to go in and check on the state of the mine, the 800 miners of the interconnected Wellington Mine had gone back to work on 3 January 1928, but the 1,100 miners at Haig were still unable to return to work. The check of the mine was also used as an effort to recover the body of Harold Horrocks who had not been recovered since the 13 December accident. A body of 24 men entered the mine to assess the damage and various trips back to the surface for sustenance and to re-fill breathing apparatus were undertaken throughout the day and night. Sometime after 11:00 pm, three explosions rocked the area, each more violent than the last. 11 survivors managed to navigate the 3 miles (4.8 km) in the dark to the bottom of the shafts where another rescue party was sent down the mine. The canaries that the rescue party carried with them soon died and when the second rescue party reached where the last explosion occurred they found the roof completely collapsed and extensive damage. As there was evidence of another fire, the area was sealed off (and has remained so since) which meant that the 13 people in the initial party and the body of Harold Horrocks were never recovered. As the area was sealed off, a definitive reason for the ignition point for the explosions was never conclusively reached.

The third disaster occurred on 29 January 1931 when an explosion hit the mine just after 8:15 pm. Of the 169 men who were working underground, 45 were in the same area as the 1928 explosion. This incident ended with 27 fatalities.

== Closure ==
By the time of the miners' national strike of 1984, Haig Colliery was the only deep mine remaining in operation in Cumbria. Shortly after miners elsewhere started walking out in protest at the NCB's planned pit closures in March 1984, the men at Haig heard that 80 per cent of them would be losing their jobs. They knew that the pit was increasingly uneconomic and appeared resigned to their fate. Despite this, NUM members at Haig voted to work through the strike, so that they could protect their redundancy terms. However, flying pickets came to Haig Pit from Northumberland and elsewhere.

On closing in March 1986, 180 jobs were lost. The shafts were capped and the surface was cleared, albeit with some buildings and the pit head gear surviving above one of the shafts. Closure of the mine represented the last deep coal mine in Cumbria; however, coal was still won in the area, but mostly via open-cast mining.

Some of the surface buildings survived and along with the two steam powered engines, the surface site was preserved as the Haig Colliery Mining Museum. This had a major refurbishment in 2015 and closed in 2016.

== West Cumbria Mining ==
In 2014, plans were announced to mine the coal under the sea near to Haig Colliery again. The surface part of the mine would be located on the former Marchon Chemical works and would utilize abandoned drift shafts from Sandwith Anhydrite mine to access coal reserves south-west of the Haig site underneath St Bees Head. Whilst there are some modest estimates about possible reserves, a note in the Haig Colliery Mining Museum stated that there is the possibility of the mine supplying 1,000,000 tonnes (980,000 long tons; 1,100,000 short tons) per year for the next 800 years. The proposed name for the new venture is Woodhouse Colliery.

In March 2018, further plans were unveiled which involved most of the product being exported by freight trains. This would involve the use of a conveyor to a railhead on the Cumbrian Coast Line then being railed to either Redcar (for export) or Scunthorpe and Port Talbot Steelworks for domestic steel production. Mining was expected to begin in 2020 with full production in 2023.

== See also ==
- Wellington Pit, Whitehaven
