= Wrecking of the Sea Horse, Boadicea and Lord Melville =

Coordinates: 52.1365°N 7.1402°W

The wrecking of the Sea Horse, Boadicea and Lord Melville took place during a gale off the east coast of Ireland on 30 January 1816. These ships were initially travelling together carrying soldiers and their families to Cork at the end of the Napoleonic War, and were wrecked with heavy loss of life.

== Wrecking ==
Sea Horse was a merchant ship that sank in Tramore Bay during a storm on 30 January 1816, killing all but 30 of 394 people on board . She had been chartered to carry members of the 2nd Battalion of the 59th (2nd Nottinghamshire) Regiment of Foot from Ramsgate to Cork. The two other ships, which had been travelling in company with Sea Horse and carrying the rest of the battalion and members of the 82nd Regiment of Foot (Prince of Wales's Volunteers) were also wrecked nearby, killing a further 12 (Lord Melville) and 190 (Boadicea) people respectively.

In January 1816 the battalion embarked at Ramsgate on chartered ships Sea Horse and Lord Melville. Five companies of troops, 16 officers and 287 men, embarked on Sea Horse along with 33 women and 8 children. The vessels sailed to the Downs on 25 January 1816, where they were joined by the brig Boadicea carrying 290 troops, and 34 women and children of the 82nd Regiment of Foot (Prince of Wales's Volunteers). The ships departed at 11:00 on 28 January and headed west along the English Channel and entered the Irish Sea at 5 pm.

The weather had deteriorated during the day, and at 4 pm on 29 January Sea Horse's mate, John Sullivan, who was the only member of that ship's officers who was familiar with the Irish coast around Cork, fell from the foremast and died three hours later from his injuries. The captain, Gibbs, was unable to locate the Kinsale lights, and by this time the weather had deteriorated to a gale. At 6 am on 30 January the ship attempted to reach the sanctuary of Waterford harbour, but at 10:30 am the foretop was brought down, severely injuring a seaman. The crew prevented the ship from being driven onto the north arm of Tramore Bay by releasing its three anchors, but the sea was breaking over her from stem to stern, and by noon the anchors were dragging. The mizzen and main mast were cut free, and the rudder was destroyed by the mountainous seas. The ship ran aground on a shoal a mile from the shore in massive seas and started breaking up at 1 pm.

The boats had been destroyed and assistance from the shore was impossible in the seas, and only 30 men, including the captain and two seamen, survived from the 394 men, women and children on board.

Lord Melville failed to clear Kinsale Head on 30 January and was driven onto a shoal 300 metres from the shore. However the ship did not break up but a boat was launched containing four women, one child and eight men. This boat foundered and only one person survived, but the twelve people killed were the only deaths from Lord Melville, the remainder of the passengers survived and left the ship as the gale subsided overnight.

However Boadicea was less fortunate. Although the ship rounded Kinsale Head it was driven onto the shore at Garretstown Beach, and broke up. About 100 people managed to scramble onto a large rock, but 190 died of the 324 aboard.

Several monuments were constructed commemorating the accidents. Waterford Crystal adopted the seahorse as its trademark, and the ship appears on the crest of Tramore.

== See also ==
- List of disasters in Great Britain and Ireland by death toll
