= Lord Melville =

Lord Melville may refer to:

- Earl of Melville, a title in the Peerage of Scotland
- Viscount Melville, a title in the Peerage of the United Kingdom
- HMS Lord Melville (1813), a schooner of the British Royal Navy
- Lord Melville (ship), one of several ships of that name
