= Lord Melville (ship) =

Several ships have been named Lord Melville after one of the Viscounts Melville:

- Lord Melville (1803 EIC ship) made six voyages as an East Indiaman for the British East India Company (EIC) before she was hulked in 1817.
- Lord Melville (1804 ship) was launched in Leith. She served as a government transport, and was probably present at the Battle of Copenhagen (1807) as an armed transport. She was last listed in 1809.
- Lord Melville was launched at Shields in 1804 and then served the British Royal Navy as HMS Porpoise between 1804 and 1816. In 1816 she returned to mercantile service as Lord Melville and made two voyages transporting convicts to Australia. She was last listed in 1820.
- Lord Melville (1807 ship), of 372 tons (bm), was launched at Quebec; a fire at sea in 1809 destroyed her.
- Lord Melville (1810 ship), of 351 tons (bm), was launched at Blythe and wrecked in 1816 in the wrecking of Sea Horse, Boadicea, and Lord Melville.
- Lord Melville (1823 ship), of 230 tons (bm), was a Falmouth packet, built at Falmouth. She foundered without a trace in February 1839 after having left Halifax, Nova Scotia for Falmouth.
- Lord Melville (1825 ship) was launched at Quebec and made one voyage for the EIC, two carrying convicts to Australia, and one carrying immigrants to Canada. She wrecked in 1836.

== See also ==
- Melville (1802 ship) was launched at Calcutta; renamed c. 1814, as Lady Campbell she made three voyages on behalf of the EIC; she is last listed in 1829.
- HMS Lord Melville
