= United Kingdom casualties of war =

United Kingdom casualties of war lists deaths of British armed forces and British citizens caused by conflicts in which the United Kingdom was involved.

Conflict	Start	End	Military Dead	Civilian Dead	Total Dead	Note
Iraq War (Operation Telic)	2003	2009	179	43	222	Casualties of the Iraq War
Afghanistan (Operation Herrick)	2001	2014	457	101	546	British Forces casualties in Afghanistan since 2001
Sierra Leone Civil War	2000	2000	1		1	
Balkans - Bosnia/Kosovo	1992	2009	72		72	Ref
Gulf War 1990–1991 (Operation Granby)	1990	1991	47		47	
Falklands War (Operation Corporate)	1982	1982	255	3	258	
Northern Ireland (Operation Banner)	1969	1998	763	1854	2617	
Aden Emergency	1963	1967	90		90	Ref
Indonesia-Malaysia confrontation	1962	1966	16		16	
Dhofar Rebellion	1962	1975	24		24	
Suez Crisis (Operation Musketeer)	1956	1956	23		23	Ref
Cyprus Emergency	1955	1959	371	16	387	Casualties in counter-insurgency operation against Greek Cypriot EOKA militant organisation
Kenya (Mau Mau Rebellion)	1952	1960	63	N/A	N/A	
Korean War	1950	1953	1109		1109	Ref
Operation Valuable, including the 1946 Corfu Channel Incident	1949	1954	300 (including Americans)	none	Over 300–400	
Yangtse River Incident	1949	1949	46		46	
Malayan Emergency	1948	1960	519		519	
Operation Masterdom	1945	1946	40		40	
Indonesian National Revolution	1945	1949	1200	Unknown	1200	
Palestine Emergency	1944	1948			784	

World War II	1939	1945	383,700	67,100	450,900	World War II deaths; includes deaths from the Crown Colonies
Arab revolt in Palestine	1936	1939	262		262	
Iraqi revolt against the British	1920	1920	1,000		5,000	Tauber, E., The Formation of Modern Syria and Iraq, pp. 312-314
Anglo-Irish War	1919	1921	776	898	1,674	Military includes Royal Irish Constabulary. Irish civilians were all British citizens during the conflict.
Third Anglo-Afghan War	1919	1921	1,136		1,136	reference - includes British Indian Army
Russian Civil War	1918	1920	1,073		1,073	-Ref
World War I	1914	1918	887,858	107,000	994,858	World War I casualties
Anglo-Aro War	1901	1902	700-800		700-800	
Boxer Rebellion	1899	1901	33	30+	33	30+
Second Boer War	1899	1902	27,000		27,000	

Second Sudan War	1898	1898	700	700	
Anglo-Zanzibar War	1896	1896	0	0	1 wounded British sailor.
Third Anglo-Burmese War	1885	1887			
First Boer War	1880	1881	408	408	
Anglo-Zulu War	1879	1879	1,900	1,900	
Second Anglo-Afghan War	1878	1880	9,850	9,850	Ref
Indian Rebellion of 1857	1857	1858	11,021+	11,021 +	Source T.A.Heathcote Mutiny and Insurgency in India 1857-58, 2007 Pen & Sword military publishers
Second Opium War	1856	1860	134	134	
Anglo-Persian War	1856	1857	1,535+	1,535+	
Crimean War	1854	1856	22,182	22,182	Ref
Second Anglo-Burmese War	1852	1853			
Second Anglo-Sikh War	1848	1849	2,687	2,687	
New Zealand Wars	1845	1872	560		
First Anglo-Sikh War	1845	1846	1,989	1,989	
First Opium War	1839	1842	69	69+	
First Anglo-Afghan War	1839	1842	5,062	5,062	
Lower Canada Rebellion	1837	1838	32	32	
Upper Canada Rebellion	1837	1838			
First Anglo-Burmese War	1824	1826	15,000	15,000	
Third Anglo-Maratha War	1817	1818			
Napoleonic Wars	1803	1815	311,000	311,000	
Seven Years' War	1756	1763	160,000	160,000	

== See also ==
- List of disasters in Great Britain and Ireland by death toll
