= Listed buildings in Micklefield =

Micklefield is a civil parish in the metropolitan borough of the City of Leeds, West Yorkshire, England. The parish contains six listed buildings that are recorded in the National Heritage List for England. All the listed buildings are designated at Grade II, the lowest of the three grades, which is applied to "buildings of national importance and special interest". The parish contains the village of Micklefield and the surrounding countryside. The listed buildings consist of a farmhouse, two farm buildings, two railway bridges, one an overbridge and the other an underbridge, and a milepost.

== Buildings ==
Name and location	Photograph	Date	Notes
Hall Farmhouse and granary 53.79801°N 1.33345°W	—	Late 17th century	The farmhouse and attached granary are in magnesian limestone with roofs of slate and pantiles. There are two storeys, and an L-shaped plan. The farmhouse has three bays and a continuous rear outshut. The doorway has a chamfered surround, and the other openings have been altered. The granary is at right angles.
Stable block, Home Farm; 53.79796°N 1.33289°W	—	Early 18th century (probable)	The stable block is in magnesian limestone with a pantile roof. There are two storeys, a rectangular plan, and a single-storey extension to the south. On the west front are stable doors and windows.
Barn and gin gang, Home Farm; 53.79771°N 1.33325°W	—	Late 18th to early 19th century (probable)	The barn and attached gin gang, which have been converted for residential use, are in magnesian limestone, the barn has a stone slate roof and the gin gang a pantile roof. The barn is rectangular with probably six bays, and a hipped roof. On the east side are two porches, and to the right is the hexagonal gin gang, the sides now infilled.
Roman Ridge Road Bridge; 53.78972°N 1.34773°W	—	1830–32	The bridge was built by the Leeds and Selby Railway to carry Ridge Road (A656 road) over its line. It is in sandstone and limestone, and consists of a single basket arch. The bridge has an impost band, rusticated voussoirs, and straight wing walls. The parapet has a string course, curved coping, and oval piers.
Old North Road Bridge; 53.78887°N 1.32703°W		1830–40	The bridge was built by the Leeds and Selby Railway to carry its line over the Great North Road, it is in sandstone and consists of a single span. The bridge has an impost band and rusticated voussoirs, and the flanking walls are angled and raked with stone coping. The parapet has a string course, and curved end piers.
Milepost at SE431331; 53.79264°N 1.34713°W		Early to mid 19th century (probable)	The milepost is on the east side of Ridge Road (A656 road). It is in stone with cast iron overlay, and has a triangular section and a rounded top. Inscribed on the upper part is "HOOK MOOR BRANCH" "MICKLEFIELD" and "BARNSDALE & LEEDS ROAD", and on the sides are the distances to Boroughbridge, Doncaster, Wetherby, Pontefract, Aberford and Castleford.
