= Haig Colliery Mining Museum =

Visitor attraction in Cumbria, England

Coordinates: 54.5428°N 3.5983°W

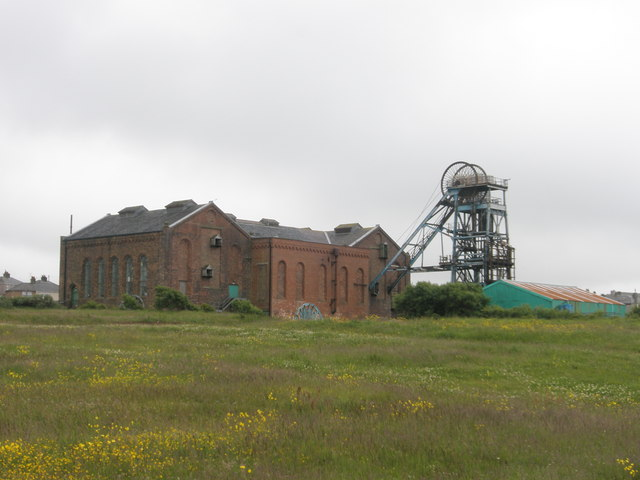

Haig Colliery Mining Museum was a visitor attraction in Kells, on the site of Cumbria's last deep coal mine on the cliffs above Whitehaven in Cumbria, England. It closed in January 2016 due to insolvency.

== History ==
The museum was an independent, volunteer-led project to provide a permanent archive of the local mining history and community resource within the remaining winding engine house, which became a scheduled monument in 1998. One of the two massive steam winding engines had been returned to working order, and many artifacts were on permanent display to help describe the life of the local miners and the social history of the area.

Coal mining in Whitehaven dates back to the 13th century when the monks from St Bees Priory supervised the opening of coal mines at Arrowthwaite. This long history ended abruptly in March 1986, when Haig Colliery, Cumbria's last deep coal mine, finally closed.

During this time, the gassy nature of the mines caused numerous violent explosions. Over 1700 men, women, and children were killed in the Whitehaven pits while mining coal, in tunnel workings up to four miles out beneath the sea bed in the Solway Firth. Haig itself had a terrible record of methane explosions in the 1920s. Fourteen miners are still entombed in the workings to this day.

=== Building ===
The mine was a large building that dominated the Kells Industrial Estate, with tall chimneys, working lifts and conveyor belts to transport the coal.

=== Transportation of coal ===
The footpath behind the building is called 'The Wagon Road' because in the 1800s, when the coal industry was at its peak in the North West of England, the coal wagons used to go down the wagon road to get to the train track to then transport the coal into the town centre where it would be distributed to the train or to the Whitehaven harbour, one of Britain's main ports at the time.

=== Closure ===
The museum closed for repairs in 2014, and after a 2.4 million refurbishment, reopened to the public in February 2015. Even though the museum attracted in excess of its anticipated 15,000 visitor numbers, financial problems meant that by January 2016 the museum had closed. Some of the buildings are being used by West Cumbria Mining as its main operating base whilst it test drills for coal off the Cumbrian coast.
