= Swaithe Main Colliery disaster =

1875 mining disaster

On 6 December 1875, an underground explosion occurred at the Swaithe Main Colliery. 239 men and boys were working underground at the time and of those, 143 died.

It is the most disastrous mining incident in Barnsley since the Oaks Colliery disaster in 1866.

On 29 November 2025, an event was held in St Thomas' Church in Worsbrough to commemorate the 150th anniversary of the event.
