= Pelican (1793 ship) =

History

Great Britain
- Name: Pelican
- Owner: Nicholas Ashton, of Woolton Hall
- Launched: 20 March 1793, Liverpool
- Fate: Foundered 20 March 1793

General characteristics
- Tons burthen: 190 (bm)
- Complement: 70
- Armament: 18 × 9&12−pounder guns + 2 × 12-pounder coehorn mortars + 6 swivel guns

Pelican was a private man of war commissioned by a Liverpool merchant for offensive operations against French commerce following the outbreak of the French Revolutionary War in February 1793. Pelican sank in bad weather on 20 March 1793.

== Background ==
Pelican was a small, armed brig. Her owners intended to have her sail as a privateer to capture French merchant shipping for a profit under a letter of marque from the British government. Captain Samuel Higgins acquired a letter of marque on 1 March.

She was crewed and outfitted in the Mersey, and on 20 March 1793, was taking her owners and their families and friends on a pleasure and working up cruise in the mouth of the river. On board were 94 sailors and approximately 40 civilians, including several women.

== Worsening weather ==
During the brief journey, the weather took a sudden turn for the worse and the ship began to rock violently, causing many of those aboard to go below decks, worsening the impending tragedy.

== Pitching and rolling ==
The brig turned near Seacombe, opposite Liverpool. Suddenly and without warning, at about two in the afternoon, with the brig at the height of her pitch, several cannon, which had been improperly tied down, broke free. These became iron missiles that rolled across the deck and punched huge holes in the ship's opposite side, causing water to flood into Pelican, which rapidly filled and sank. The location of the wreck was so shallow that her mast tops remained above the water, visible after the storm had died down. Unfortunately, because all unnecessary personnel had been ushered below and because the hatches were battened down during the storm, no one was able to escape the lower decks.

Just 32 people survived the disaster, 102 drowning in the sunken ship. The survivors were mainly men who had remained on deck and were able to launch boats, or those who were rescued from the masts some time later by rescue craft from the nearby shoreline. The disaster was reported in The Times three days later. Lloyd's List reported that Pelican had overset in the river at Liverpool and that some 60 people had drowned.

John Starkey, the excise surveyor, was able to rescue 25 people by taking his boat from the Pierhead. He later received a medal from the Humane Society. One of the people saved was the pilot. He was tried for manslaughter at Lancaster Assizes under the theory that his negligence had caused the disaster; he was acquitted.
