= Wellington Pit, Whitehaven =

Coal mine in northern England

Wellington Pit was a coal mine in the town of Whitehaven in the historic county of Cumberland in northern England. Sited near the coast, it was operated by the Whitehaven Colliery Company which sank twin shafts between 1840 and 1845 to extract coal from the 10 foot thick Main Band coal seam. The workings eventually extended four miles under the nearby Irish Sea. The buildings of the mine complex were designed by architect Sydney Smirke to resemble a castle. Little now remains beyond the 'candlestick chimney', some walls and Wellington Lodge.

== Disaster ==
In 1910 the pit was the scene of Whitehaven's worst mining disaster when 136 miners lost their lives, after an explosion and resultant fires and collapses.
