= Sea Horse (1782 ship) =

Merchant ship, whaler, and transport (1782–1816)

History

Great Britain
- Name: Sea Horse
- Namesake: The Hippocampus (mythology)
- Builder: Randall and Brent, Gravesend
- Launched: 30 March 1782
- Captured: October 1795

Spain
- Name: Principe Fernando
- Acquired: circa October 1795 by purchase of a prize
- Captured: January 1800

Great Britain
- Name: Sea Horse
- Acquired: 1800 by purchase of a prize
- Fate: Wrecked 1816

General characteristics
- Tons burthen: 280, or 285 (bm)
- Length: 98 ft 6 in (30.0 m)
- Beam: 26 ft 5 in (8.1 m)
- Depth of hold: 11 ft 6 in (3.5 m)
- Complement: 20
- Armament: 1782: 20 × 9-pounder + 2 × 6-pounder guns; 1795:18 × 4-pounder guns + 4 swivel guns; 1801:4 × 6-pounder guns + 4 × 12-pounder carronades; 1806:8 × 18−pounder carronades; 1816: 6 × 12−pounder carronades

Sea Horse was launched in 1782 at Gravesend for the Hudson's Bay Company. She then became a merchantman that a French naval squadron captured in 1795. She next became the Spanish merchantman Principe Fernando, which a Guernsey privateer recaptured in January 1800. She became a merchantman again, and then made one voyage as a whaler. She became a Government transport and it was as a transport that she was wrecked in 1816 with great loss of life.

== Hudson's Bay Company ==
Flag of the Hudson's Bay Company (1707-1801)

Sea Horse first appeared in Lloyd's Register (LR) in 1782 with J.Richards, master, Hudson's Bay Company (HBC), owner, and trade London–Hudson Bay.

The HBC sailed Sea Horse for ten years, as she carried trade between the company's outposts in the Bay and London. She sailed to York Factory, Moose Factory, and Prince of Wales Fort. Her masters were John Richards (1782–1786), John Tunstall (1787–1788), and Henry Hanwell (1790–1792).

Sea Horse returned to Gravesend on 20 October 1792 from Hudson Bay in company with three other vessels. On 12 December it was reported that Sea Horse had been auctioned off for £2030.

== Merchantman ==
Sea Horse next appeared in Lloyd's List's ship arrival and departure (SAD) data on 24 July 1794 with Patterson, master, sailing on a voyage from Gravesend to Leghorn. Captain Charles Patterson acquired a letter of marque on 8 July 1794.

LR caught up with the changes in master, ownership, and trade in its 1795 volume.

Year	Master	Owner	Trade	Source
1795	C.Patterson	Hadfield	London–Leghorn	LR

In October 1795 a French squadron captured Sea Horse, Patterson, master, as well as a number of other British merchantmen, and took them into Cadiz. The captors were a squadron under Joseph de Richery; Richery's expedition succeeded in capturing a convoy of 30 merchantmen and HMS Censeur in the battle of the Levant Convoy.

== Spanish merchantman ==
At Cadiz private parties purchased Sea Horse, which then became Principe Fernando. In 1799 the Spanish South Sea Company fitted her out for a voyage to Lima.

In January 1800 the privateer lugger Tartar, of Guernsey, Le Cocq, master, captured and sent into Guernsey the Spanish vessel Prince Ferdinand, Pinnca, master which had been sailing from Cadiz to the South Seas. The advertisement for the sale of the vessel and her cargo described her as "formerly the Ship Sea-horse, built in the River Thames, of near 300 tons".

== Transport ==
Seahorse re-entered LR in the 1801 issue as a London-based transport. She first reappeared in Lloyd's List ship arrival and departure (SAD) data in December 1804 with Ford, master, having arrived at Lisbon from Gibraltar.

Year	Master	Owner	Trade	Source
1801	R.Fead	Folder & Co.	London transport	LR
1803	R.Fead; Halcrow	Folder & Co.	London transport London–South Seas	LR

== Whaler ==
During the Peace of Amiens, J. Faulder & Co. employed Sea Horse on a whaling voyage. At the time, she was valued at £6,000. Captain Halcrow sailed from London on 20 January 1803, bound for Delagoa Bay. He returned to London on 17 May 1804. His previous voyage had been as master of Fortune, which had returned to London in April 1802.

== Transport ==
On her return from whaling, J.Faulder had Sea Horse repaired. She again became a government transport, her charter being dated 20 April 1804. Her first role was a transport for Admiral Home Riggs Popham's expedition to capture the Cape Colony.

Popham sent her on 20 January 1806 to carry to London the dispatches announcing the success of the expedition. He choose her as she was the fastest sailer other than the warships HMS Diadem and Narcissus. She carried Lieutenant Cuthbert Daly (later Admiral Daly) and others back to England following the surrender of the Cape of Good Hope. Daly was present at its surrender by the Dutch to the British, and was charged with reporting this to the Admiralty in London, for which he was rewarded by promotion to Commander.

The registers did not pick up the change in role for Sea Horse until 1806-1807.Sea Horse then served the Transport Board (Royal Navy) under several different masters from 3 May 1805 to 11 January 1815, and then again from 22 March 1815 to 29 September.

Year	Master	Owner	Trade	Source & notes
1806	R.Feard	Folder & Co.	London transport	Register of Shipping (RS); large repair 1805
1807	Feard	J.Faulder	Cork	LR
1812	Feard; J.Mackay	J.Faulder	Cork; London transport	LR; small repairs 1812
1816	Mucklow	Folder & Co.	London transport	RS; new deck and side, and repair 1805; repairs 1812

After Napoleon's escape from Elba, Sea Horse again served the Transport Board from 22 March 1815 to 29 September. Her last service began on 26 December.

== Fate ==
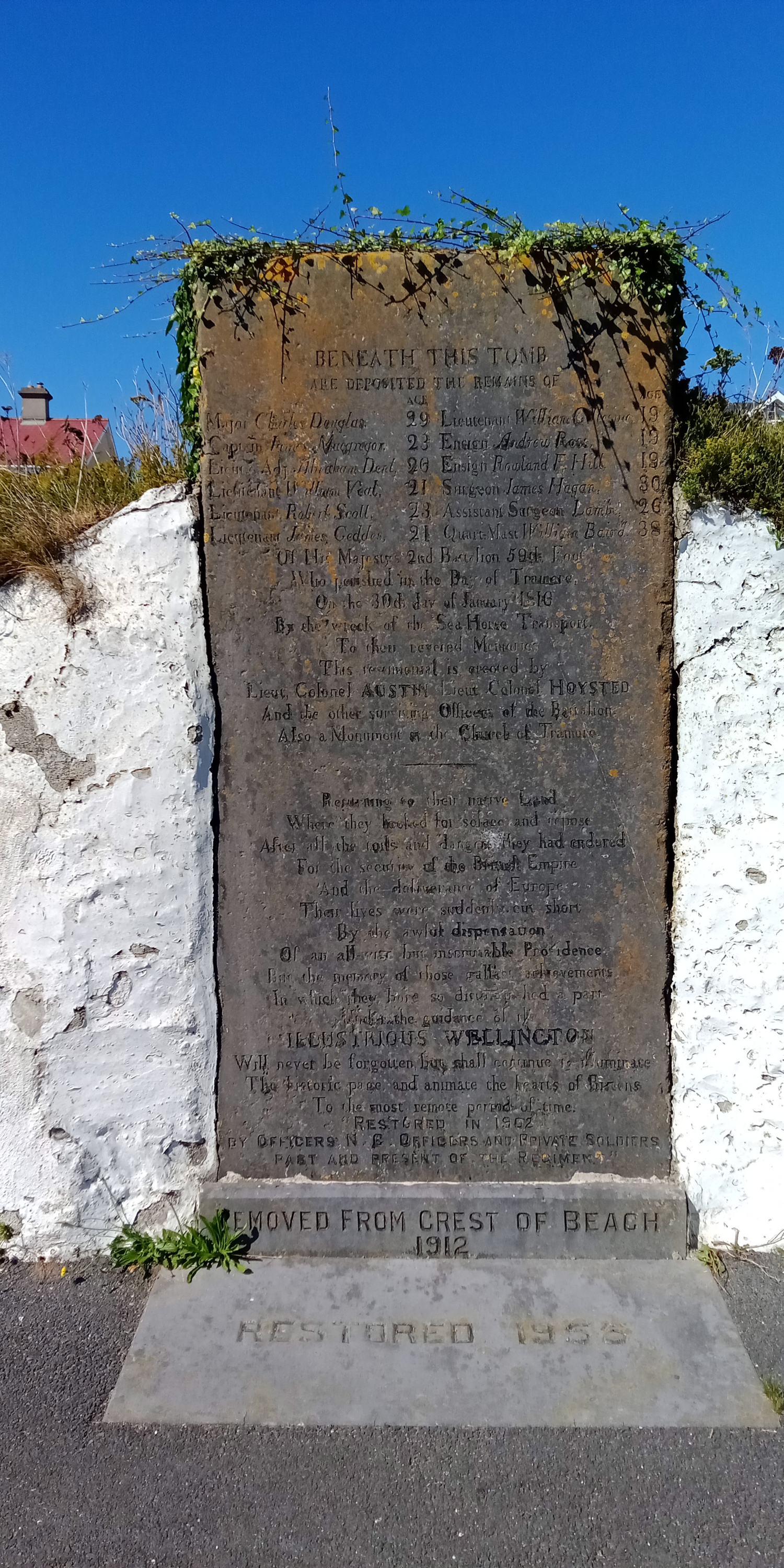
Memorial in Tramore

Sea Horse, James Gibbs, master, was in company with Boadicea and Lord Melville on 30 January 1816. These ships were travelling together carrying soldiers and their families to Cork at the end of the Napoleonic War when all three wrecked in Tramore Bay.

When Sea Horse sank all but 30 of the 394 people on board died; Gibbs was one of the survivors. She had been chartered to carry members of the 2nd Battalion of the 59th Regiment of Foot from Ramsgate to Cork. Lord Melville and Boadicea were carrying the rest of the battalion and members of the 82nd Regiment of Foot. The two were wrecked nearby with the loss of a further 12 lives on Lord Melville and 190 on Boadicea.
