= Micklefield =

Village and civil parish in West Yorkshire, England

Coordinates: 53.795°N 1.327°W

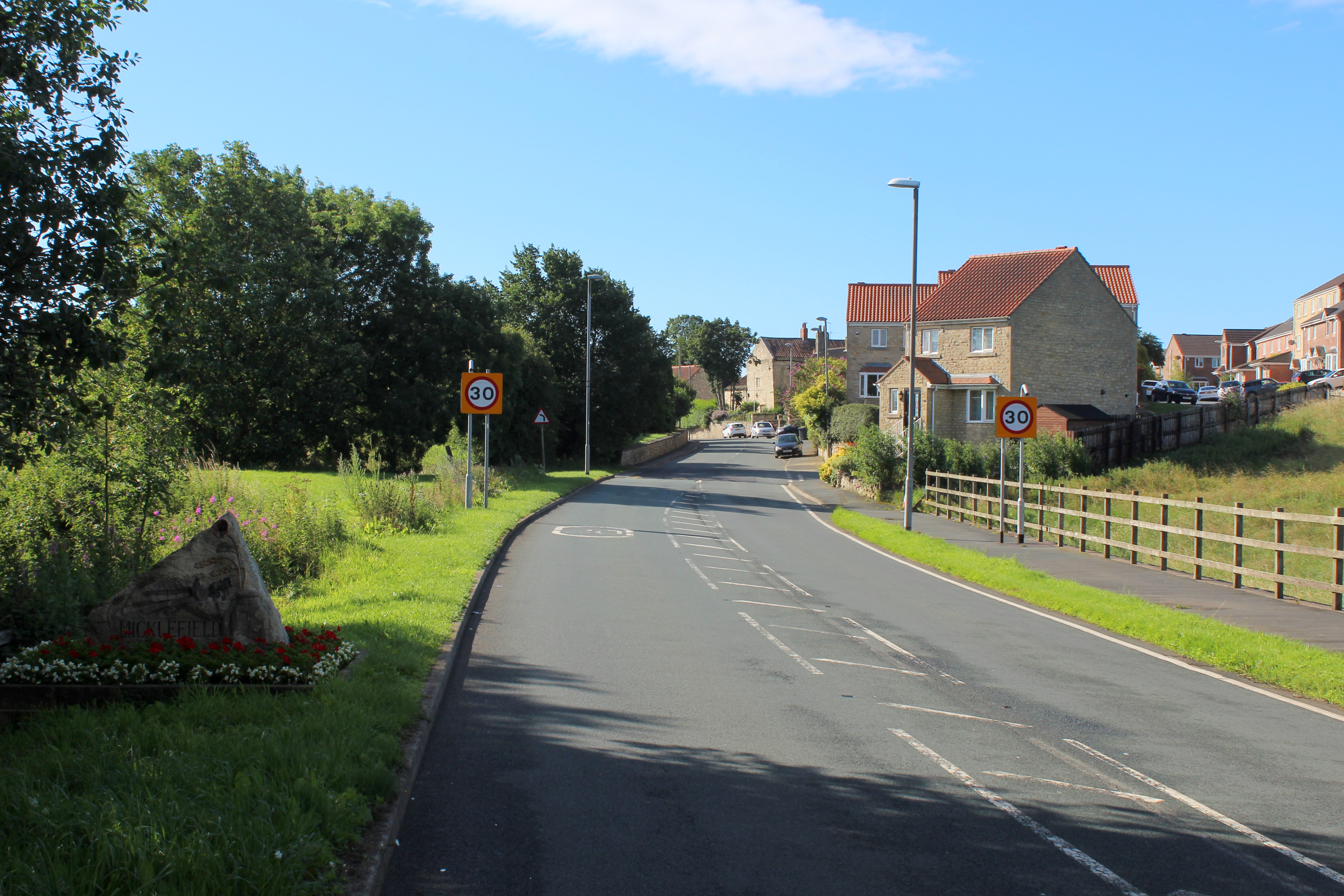

- Location within West Yorkshire
- Population: 1,893 (2011)
- Metropolitan borough: City of Leeds
- Metropolitan county: West Yorkshire
- Region: Yorkshire and the Humber
- Country: England
- Sovereign state: United Kingdom
- Post town: Leeds
- Postcode district: LS25
- Dialling code: 0113
- Police: West Yorkshire
- Fire: West Yorkshire
- Ambulance: Yorkshire
- UK Parliament: Selby

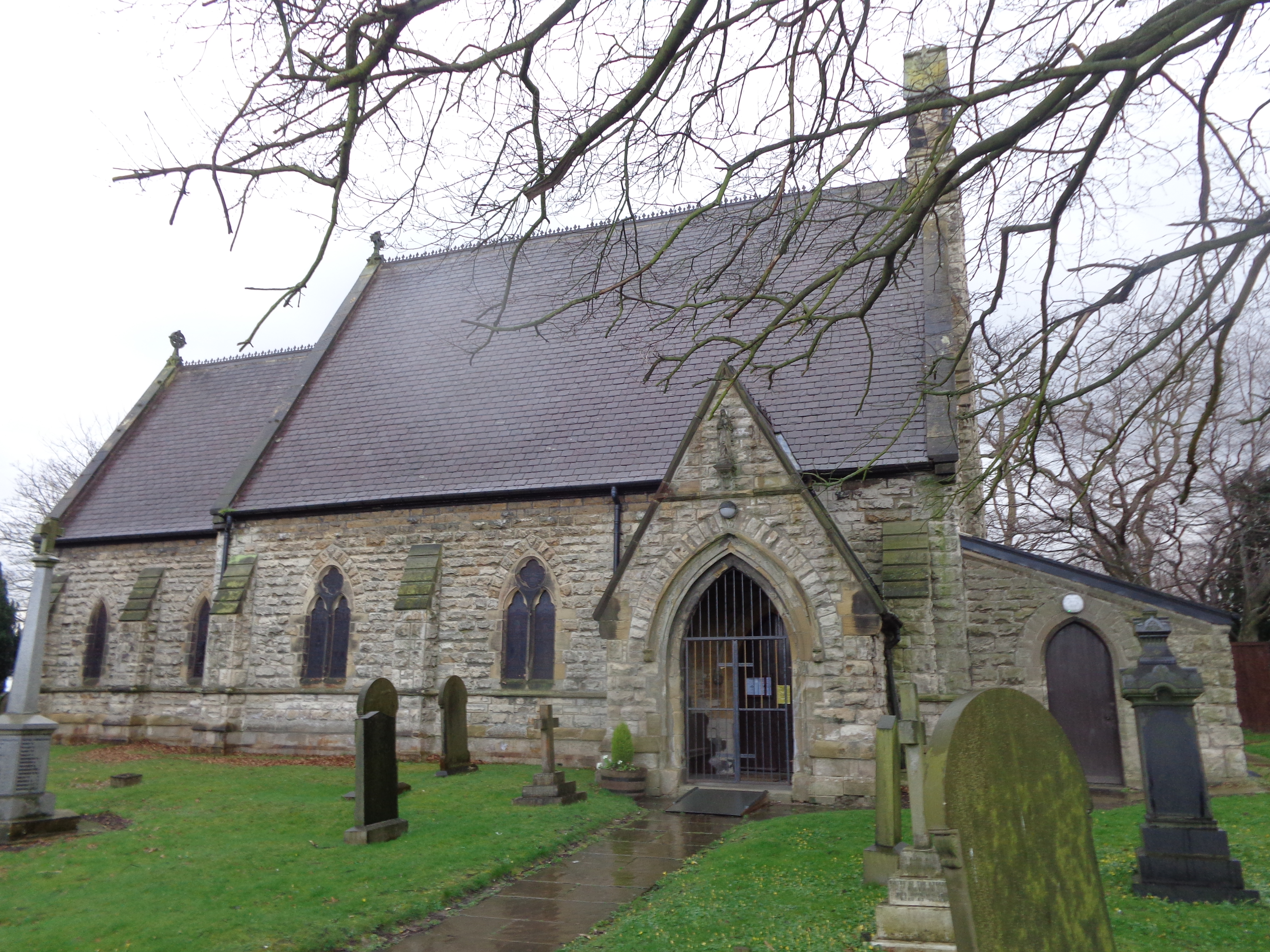
St Mary the Virgin, the parish church of Micklefield.

Micklefield is a village and civil parish in the City of Leeds in West Yorkshire, England. It neighbours Garforth, Aberford and Brotherton and is close to the A1(M) motorway. The population as of the 2011 Census was 1,893, increased from 1,852 in 2001.

The name Micklefield derives from the Old English micelfeld meaning 'big field'.

== Geography ==
The village is typical of Yorkshire's former coal mining communities with its mix of local authority and private houses. It has undergone a rapid expansion in recent years with former commercial premises being demolished to make way for new private housing. The police house, fire station, community centre and local miner's welfare club have closed leaving the village with one public house, the Blands Arms, and two local convenience stores, in addition to land known locally as the "Mickie Rec" (recreation ground) which contains a football pitch, cricket pitch and two bowling greens. The "Rec" was owned and operated by the Coal Board before the closure of the local pit in 1980.

The 1½ mile, £460,000, Micklefield Bypass opened in 1960. It was replaced by the A1(M) in 2005. Nearby, to the west, is the A656 Roman Ridge Road.

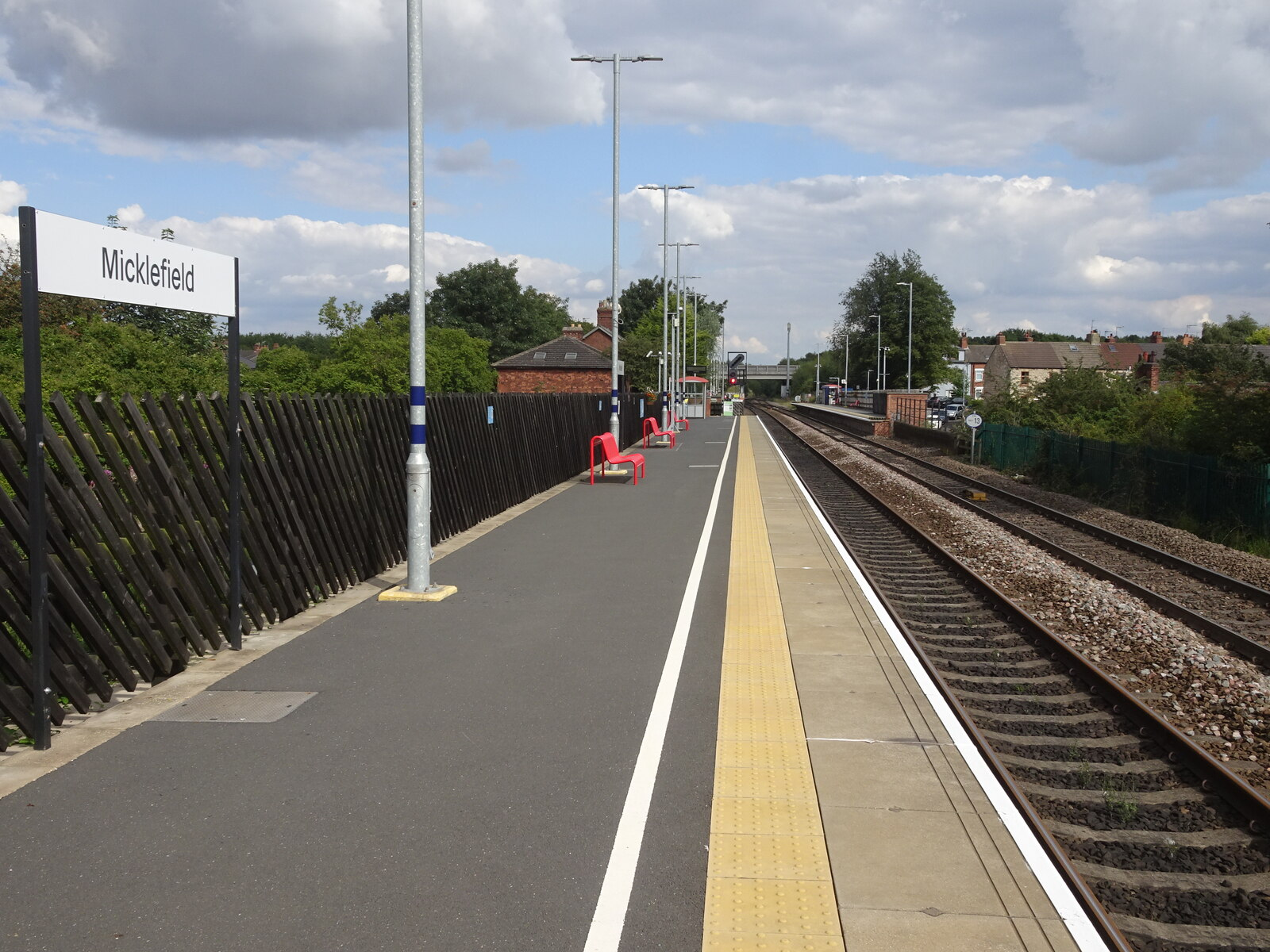
Micklefield railway station

Micklefield railway station is approximately midway between Leeds to the west and York/Selby to the east. In June 2006 it won the award for "best kept railway station" in all Yorkshire, after making huge strides in the refurbishment of the station. In April 2017 work was undertaken in Micklefield to realign the track as part of the Transpennine route upgrade, and the position of the Leeds bound platform was altered.

There are proposals for a new station called East Leeds Parkway. This would have a park and ride scheme with space for 500 cars. This station would be sited close to Micklefield but the scheme was put on hold due to a lack of central government funding.

Through the 1970s and 1980s Micklefield had a sometimes poor reputation locally as a result of crime on the Garden Village local authority housing estate and the policies then occupied by Leeds City Council.

Micklefield was briefly mentioned on the BBC 3 series "Ladhood" alongside neighbouring Garforth, the primary setting for the show.

=== Old and New Micklefield ===
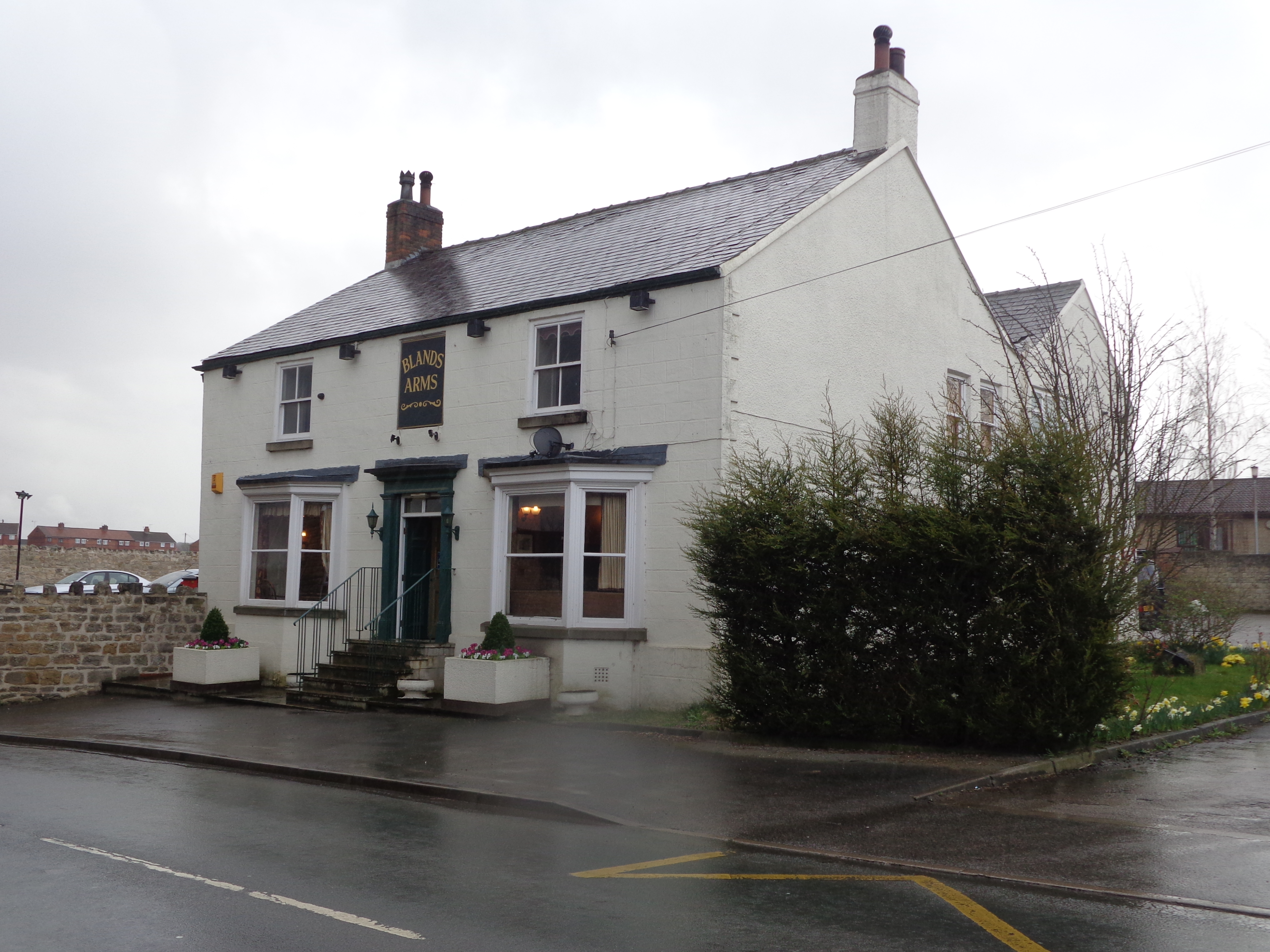
Blands Arms, Old Micklefield

Micklefield is a village of two halves. One road – the Great North Road or "the old A1" – links the two with a distinctive S bend surrounded fields giving a fair indication of when moving from one half to the other.

The southern part is known as "new Micklefield". It contains the railway station, landfill site, industrial park and allotments. Housing consists mainly of late 19th century/early 20th century terraced cottages built for miners, some larger pre-war semi-detached houses, and the Garden Village housing estate. In recent years, new flats have been built next to Pit Lane. The old fire station is used as a community centre. Nearby is a sandwich bar, and a small independent shop.

The northerly part of the village (Old Micklefield) has fewer visible ties to the village's industrial past, and contains most of the village amenities, including the church, school, pub, farm shop, general stores (formerly the post office) and Doctors surgery. The parish church is dedicated to St Mary the Virgin. The Churchville housing estate consists of 1950s brick semi-detached houses, retirement bungalows and terraces, and is bordered by large detached houses, character properties and modern town houses.

In recent years Old Micklefield has seen new developments of additional higher end detached/semi-detached properties, including the Grange Farm Development on Great North Road, and a further 12 properties called 'Manor Chase', situated opposite the village school. In spring 2019, work began on a larger expansion to the village, which will eventually infill the land between the existing Great North Road and adjacent motorway. It will also tie together the two parts of the village, taking up much of the green space in-between the two. The developers involved are Strata, Barratt Homes (developing Drovers Court) and Persimmon. The Strata development is advertised as being made up of 4–5 bedroom homes. Local concern centres around how the villages amenities will cope with the expansion, as little is currently planned in terms of improvements.

=== Mining history ===
The area had been a site of coal mining since the 13th century. In 1835 and 1836, Micklefield Colliery was sunk. A second colliery, Peckfield, was sunk between 1872 and 1875, producing high volatile bituminous coal in the Westphalian Coal Measures.. Peckfield was still open at the time of nationalisation. After the financial year 1965–66, plans began to close the colliery, which was nearing exhaustion. Owing to the being one of the nearest collieries to the new Selby Coalfield, the Peckfield workforce was amongst the first to have the offer of relocation to Selby on the pit's closure in 1980. The Peckfield site remained open for the washing of coal from nearby Ledston Luck Colliery until the end of the 1982–83 financial year. The site is now a landfill.

In the first half of the 20th century, two seams of coal were worked. The first was the Beeston seam at 170–180 yards depth; the second was a deeper Blackbed seam at 210–220 yards.

Up to the 1980s the pit was served by a 2' 6" gauge rail link which transported coal from Ledston Luck Mine to the south, from where the coal could be shipped via the mainline rail.

The pit came into operation in the 1870s and was the location of an enormous explosion on 30 April 1896, in which 63 of the 300 workers (men and boys) died. Twenty died from the explosion, the rest from afterdamp. Only four of the 23 pit ponies survived the disaster. Ninety children were rendered fatherless in the disaster, and plaques in the village school, church and pub are dedicated to their loss.

== Sport and leisure ==
=== Football ===
Micklefield AFC are an amateur football team. They play their home fixtures in the village recreation ground. The pitch consists of 1 small covered terraced stand and a metal barrier runs round the perimeter to prevent encroachment.

Micklefield AFC was established in 1953, although it wasn't until the late 1960s that it rose to prominence. The club enjoyed great success throughout the 1970s and 80s, winning several amateur leagues and cups. The 1990s saw the retirement of many key players and subsequently the club's form on the pitch deteriorated. In 2002 the club reached its first final since the 1970s and 1980s only to lose in injury time. In 2004 the club folded due to a lack of players. The club was revived in 2007.

=== Cricket ===
There is a cricket pitch in the rec. Micklefield do not have a team but the pitch is occasionally used by Kippax Welfare and Aberford.

=== Skate Park ===
The recreation ground contains a skate park, built in 2009.

=== Multi use games area ===
In late 2016, fundraising was undertaken in conjunction with a local supermarket to raise funds for a multi use games area. In July 2017 construction began on the surface which is situated in the recreation ground, on the disused site of the former village bowling green.

Public House

The local pub, The Blands Arms, reopened on Thursday 19th November 2026 after being closed for many years. A Sam Smith’s brewery pub, it is the only pub in the village. Consisting of a Lounger Bar, where no electronic devices are allowed and a Public Bar where they are. It has a large car park and is situated in the middle of the village.

== School ==
Since records began Micklefield has been noted to have three primary schools, with one of them tragically burning down at the bottom end of the village, in the early 1980s. During the period when Micklefield had no school, students attended primary schools in Sherburn-in-Elmet and Garforth Barley Hill Road school for a short period. During this period the current school was built. It is situated in the middle of the village. Micklefield CofE Primary School was rebuilt using portacabins on the site of the old school which had burnt down until 1987 when it was relocated to the middle of the village besides the local public house, the Bland's Arms.

== Hook Moor Wind Farm ==
Proposals brought by Banks Renewables Ltd to build a wind farm on Hook Moor, to the east (and slightly north) of the village but separated from it by the A1(M) motorway section, provoked strong emotions and divisions within the community. Village opinion was polarized along north–south lines, with some Old Micklefield residents accusing New Micklefielders who support the plans, of "Schadenfreude". To which, the standard reply was, if the plans were situated in New Micklefield, nobody would be against the proposals at all.

Banks submitted a planning application in 2008, which was refused by Leeds City Council in 2009, and an appeal by Banks in 2010 was rejected. Banks then sought a judicial review, and the High Court found that the criteria on which the wind farm had been rejected were invalid. A second planning application in 2011 was approved.

Construction of the wind farm began in 2015, and came online the following year with a total of 5 turbines with electricity production capacity of 10 MW.

== See also ==
- Listed buildings in Micklefield
