= Masbrough boat disaster =

The Masbrough boat disaster (also known as the Rotherham boat disaster and the Masbrough ship disaster) was a disaster that occurred in a boatyard on the River Don in Masbrough, Yorkshire, now a suburb of Rotherham, on 5 July 1841. The disaster occurred during the launching of a new boat: sixty-four people, mainly children were drowned in the river.

== Events ==
The disaster took place at the launching of the sea-going riverboat the John and William from Chambers' boatyard on the Masbrough side of the River Don. The boat was built for Messrs. Henry and Edward Cadnam of Pitsmoor, Sheffield. On the occasion of the launching of a boat it was common to invite local people to celebrate the launch. Local teachers and schoolchildren came along and a gala was planned. It was customary at this yard to invite people to stand on the boat during the launch to enjoy the rush into the water. Upwards of 100 people (some accounts say 150), mainly children from 11 to 16, were standing upon the boat during the launch.

Owing to the narrow river channel, boats at this yard were launched sideways. As the boat slid down the slipway towards the water, the people on board rushed towards the river side of the boat to get a better view of the boat hitting the water. This caused the boat to overbalance on its keel, throwing the people on the deck into the river. The boat landed on top of many of the people who had been thrown into the river, drowning them. Although members of the gathering managed to rescue some, sixty-four people died in the disaster, either instantly, or not long after being retrieved from the river. Fifty of those who died were children. Several families lost two or even three members.

The losses cut across social classes. Several of the children who died were the sons of wealthy local businessmen, including sons of both partners of the iron founders Yates Haywood. Indeed, one casualty had just turned 21 and come into significant property. The majority, however, were children of ordinary families of the local area.

== Aftermath ==
A grand jury was sitting at Rotherham on the day of disaster. This was adjourned after news of the disaster reached them so that the gentlemen sitting on the jury could survey the scene of the disaster.

The later coroner's inquest sat at the Angel Inn in Rotherham. They spent the first four hours going from house to house to see the bodies of the dead. After that evidence was heard from various witnesses. The jury found that the disaster was an accident.

After the disaster £200 was raised to assist with relieving the poorer bereaved families, and to build a memorial to the dead.

== Memorials ==
Memorials to the disaster were built next the Walker mausoleum in Masbrough, and in the Rotherham parish church (now Rotherham Minster). The Masbrough memorial along with the mausoleum is now in a state of disrepair and is subject to a local appeal for renovation.
