= Peckfield Colliery disaster =

1896 mining accident in West Yorkshire, England

The Peckfield pit disaster was a mining accident at the Peckfield Colliery in Micklefield, West Yorkshire, England, which occurred on Thursday 30 April 1896, killing 63 men and boys out of 105 who were in the pit, plus 19 out of 23 pit ponies.

== Accidents ==
In October 1874, at the ceremony for turning the first sod of earth to start the sinking of two shafts for the Micklefield pit, Mr. Joseph Cliff, senior partner of the Micklefield Coal and Lime Company, expressed his earnest wish that the works begun that day might prosecuted and completed without the slightest accident to life or limb, and that a spirit of respect and union might at all times prevail between employers and employed.

However, the first fatality at Peckfield Colliery occurred when William Martin, a colliery carpenter, aged 38, was killed on Tuesday 27 November 1877, a year after the pit opened. He was part of a team of nine men supervised by the engineer Samuel Clough who were installing a new boiler. The boiler was lowered into the pit by a rope, operated by steam, and Martin was one of three men at the pit top ensuring that the rope ran smoothly. At 2:20 pm, the shackle of rope caught the end of a batten. Martin climbed a fence and called to the engineman to stop the rope, and tried to raise it, to free it, when the fence gave way. Martin caught hold of the balk and swung for a couple of seconds before falling 175 yards down the 14 foot wide shaft. Clough found his body in water at the pit bottom.

James Haslegrave, aged 24, was the second fatality, when he was killed by a small fall of coal down the shaft, from a corf he'd just sent up to the surface. He was standing in for the Hanger-on, Mr James Shillito, who had been ill. The accident was witnessed by the underground manager Mr. William Radford. Both Shillito and Radford would be killed in the 1896 disaster. After a further three fatalities in the early 1880s following roof falls, 53-year-old George Mosby was crushed to death by a stone on 6 September 1886. Fellow miner, Samuel Marriott heard his cry, and found him in the goaf, his legs crushed under the stone. Marriott and John Sutton, managed to free him after 15 minutes and put him in a corf, but Mosby died 15 minutes later. John Gerrard, Inspector of Mines attended the coroner's inquest. Samuel Marriott would also survive the 1896 Disaster, as would George Mosby's son, Lot. John Sutton however would be killed.

== The Peckfield Colliery Disaster, 1896 ==
=== Background ===
Peckfield Colliery was owned by Messrs. Joseph Cliff and Sons, with Mr. Joseph Cliff being senior partner of the Micklefield Coal and Lime Company. Mr. Charles Houfton had been the manager since the colliery opened, and Mr. William Radford had been employed as the Under Manager for 17 years. Despite seven fatal accidents in nineteen years, Peckfield was considered by miners to be a safe mine. Ventilation was drawn through the seams by a Waddle fan at the top of the Upcast shaft, and had removed the eleven instances of small escapes of gas since 1891. Men worked with picks by the light of tallow candles, whilst the undermanager and five deputies carried safety lamps.

The Downcast shaft was used to transport coal, supplies, and men, and only went to the Beeston Bed, a depth of 175 yards from the surface. The Upcast shaft was used to transport men and was sunk to both the Beeston and Black Bed, the latter being at a depth of 240 yards from the surface. From the bottom of the Downcast shaft, the mine stretched approximately one mile in all four directions.

Ordinarily a shift of 260 miners would descend at 6 am, and an overnight shift of 40 men would work on repairs from 10 pm to 6 am. However, the miners had only been doing three paid days a week for several weeks, and on Thursday 30 April 1896 no coal was to be removed, consequently no miners would be paid. The 105 men entering the pit on 30 April were datallers, and miners wanting to achieve greater productivity for the next paying day.

=== The Explosion ===
The explosion was caused by a slight fall in the roof in Goodall's gate, on the West side of the mine, 943 yards from the Downcast shaft. A small quantity of fire-damp escaping from the crack in the roof was ignited by a miner's candle at 7:15 am, just as the men were starting work. No gas had previously been found in the New North Road or Goodall's Gate in the West Level. Two miners and their ponies were killed at the point of impact, and four more were killed as they began to flee. The explosion travelled south, down New North Road against the air flow, as coal dust dislodged by the explosion carried the dull flame beyond its point of origin, and expanded into a roaring flame when it reached the air in the West Level main intake, and then continued to expand through the mine, killing miners and trapping them, as roofs fell. The explosion tore through the stables, killing and burning the horsekeeper, plus 12 of the 14 pit ponies. The two pit ponies who survived were stood in the middle, partly sheltered by the other ponies.

The explosion ripped through the office, killing the Underground Manager William Radford and a deputy, and other miners and brakesman who were positioned nearby. The explosion travelled up the main shaft, and blew the cage into the headgear. The sound of the explosion reaching the surface was described as like the boom of a cannon, and was heard at other villages within a six-mile radius, such as Crossgates, Stanks, Garforth, South Milford, Sherburn, and by a cyclist at Bramham.

Two secondary explosions were generated by the first, and killed more miners and ponies before dissipating. In total, 20 miners were killed in the three explosions showing signs of burning, with a further 4 killed by the force of the explosion. Of the 81 men in the pit who survived the explosions, only 42 managed to reach the surface alive, as many miners were trapped by roof falls and succumbed to after-damp poisoning. Rescuers retrieving the bodies described how the miners’ footprints in the dust could be traced showing the roads they had travelled along in an endeavour to escape before they were overwhelmed. All 11 miners who were in the Black Bed seam escaped. However, they heard and felt the force of the explosion in the Beeston Bed and were knocked off their feet or struck by trap doors. They were very quickly rendered unconscious for an hour by after-damp, and upon waking, the Deputy, Robert Henry Nevins, was asked by the young teenage miners to pray for them. With the cages out of operation, they had to scramble up a stone drift to reach the Beeston Bed and were overcome by afterdamp again, 600 yards from shaft. Barely able to walk, they were forced to leave behind one of their party, Fred Atkinson, and upon reaching the No.2 shaft, another party of survivors gathered there witnessed them being violently ill and in distress. The sick and injured were the first to be sent up to the surface two hours later once repairs had been made to the cage.

=== Rescue efforts ===
With the help of the engineer Samuel Clough, the three night deputies who had just finished their shift, were the first to attempt to rescue the miners below ground. At 8:30 am, they descended the No.2 shaft, but their descent was blocked 18 feet from the bottom by a broken wrought iron steam pipe which had been blown across the shaft. This steam pipe carried the compressed air down and drove the ventilation, which had consequently stopped. Peckfield Colliery Manager, Charles Houfton and Garforth Colliery Manager, Robert Routledge, both arrived at Micklefield from Garforth at 8:50 am, and assisted by Samuel Clough they descended the No.2 shaft, and with a little maneuvering they got the cage past the obstruction and got down to the Beeston Seam, and began to help the survivors out of the mine, including Fred Atkinson. Doctors Griesbach, Abbott, Gaines, Radcliffe and Carr were soon in attendance from surrounding villages to help revive both the rescued miners and some of the rescuers who were brought out of the mine suffering from the effects of after-damp. These included two of the night deputies, and several of the rescued miners, who immediately joined the rescue parties. Other colliery managers and officials arrived to assist with rescue operations, including John Gerrard, and John Plowright Houfton. During the day, many people arrived at the pit head from Micklefield and the Micklefield railway station to await news of their relatives, and to offer their assistance.

=== Aftermath ===
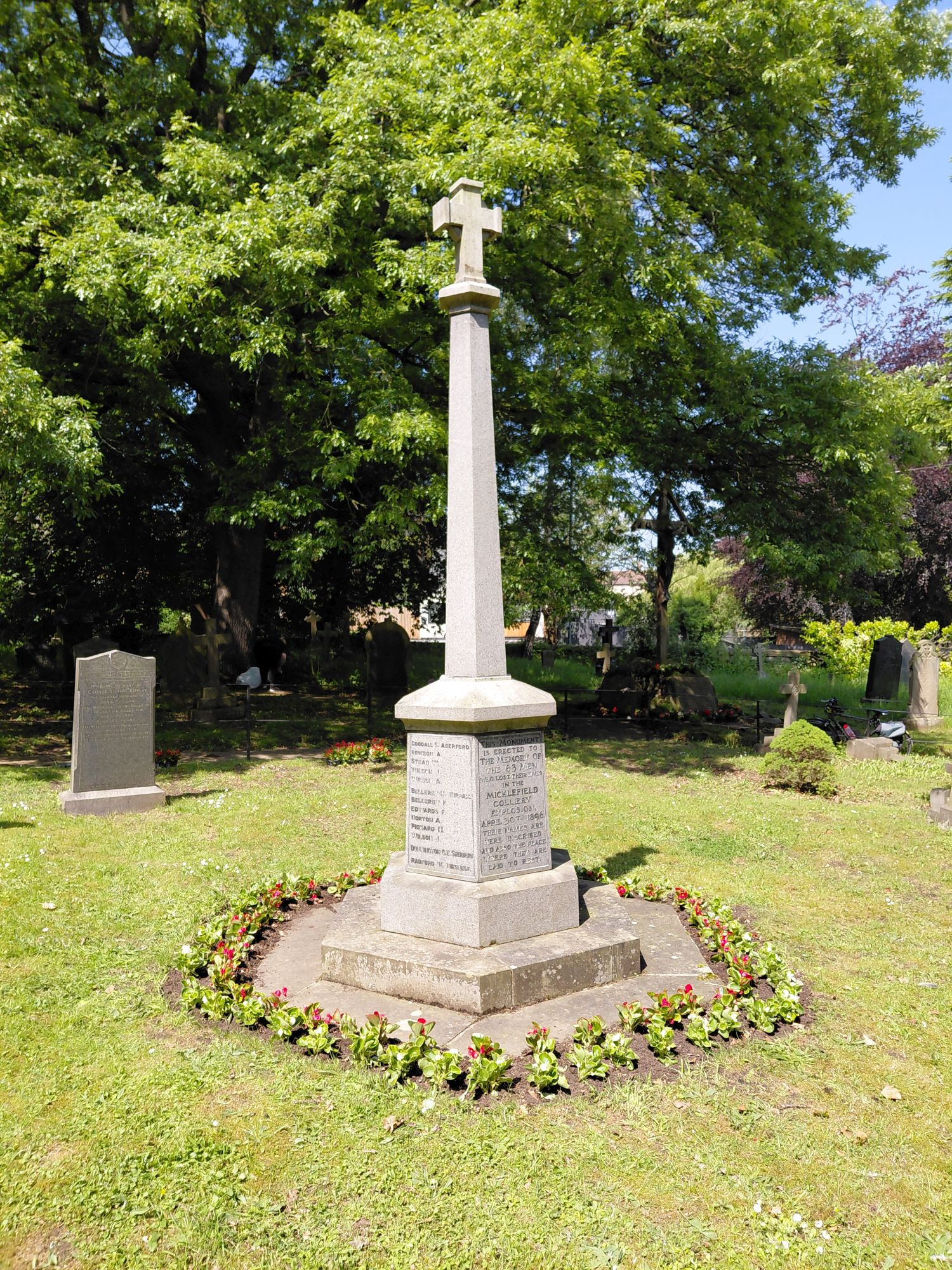
Memorial in the churchyard of St Mary the Virgin, Micklefield

Her Majesty's Inspector of Mines for Yorkshire and Lincolnshire, Frank Wardell, arrived in Micklefield at 11:30 pm on 30 April and spent most of the night down the mine. He stated that he did not know of a single instance in which so much damage had been done to a pit by an explosion. The bodies of miners began to be removed overnight: 29 were recovered by Friday night, and a further 26 on Saturday, including William Naylor Whitaker who was brought out alive at 2:30 pm, and attended to by Dr. Sydney Griesbach and Dr. John Scott Haldane, but died at 10 pm in Leeds General Infirmary. A further four bodies were recovered on Sunday. The last four bodies were recovered on 7, 12 and 14 May. There were 23 ponies in the mine, and 4 survived. As well as the two in the stable, one pony was found in the No.2 South Bord near to where William Naylor Whitaker had been found, and the other was rescued a fortnight later in the No.1 Dip, after its two hurriers had left it in an endeavour to escape the pit, but both succumbed to after-damp.

On Sunday 3 May 1896, an estimated 25,000 people attended the burials in Micklefield of the first miners recovered from the pit. Forty-three miners were interred at Micklefield, eight at Garforth, six at Kippax, five at Aberford, whilst William Radford was interred at Clay Cross, Derbyshire.

At the inquest to the disaster on Wednesday 20 May 1896, the jury returned the verdict: "We are unanimous that the explosion was caused by gas, and was purely accidental, and that no blame is to be attached to any person." The cause of the explosion was fire-damp coming into contact with a naked light and exploding, thus igniting coal dust, with the coal dust carrying the explosion forward from its initial point. The Colliery Owners followed the recommendations of the inquest and issued miners with Routledge Newcastle safety lamps.

Of the 63 victims, three were widowers, 22 were single, and 38 were married. Of the 38 married men, only four had no children, and there were 107 dependent children upon 34 widows, plus 14 elderly dependent people, and three survivors unable to work due to injuries sustained. A collection in aid of the widows and dependents was started by J. C Rhodes of Sherburn at the Pit head when he pinned a £5 note to a sheet of paper. This collection was augmented by an appeal from the local newspapers, with Queen Victoria contributing £50. Eventually £20,625 was raised, including £1,000 donated by the Colliery Owners. This fund was also subsequently used to help the bereaved dependents from similar colliery disasters, such as £1,000 donated to the Cadeby appeal in 1912, and £500 to the Senghenydd relief fund in 1913.

A memorial to the 63 victims of the disaster stands at Micklefield Church, as does a plaque dedicated to the widows. A plaque dedicated to the victims is to be found at the Bland's Arms public house, Micklefield; and a third plaque dedicated to the orphans is to be found at Micklefield Infants' school.
