= Lord Melville (1810 ship) =

1810 British ship

United Kingdom
- Name: Lord Melville
- Owner: 1810:Holland; 1816:Hogg & Co.
- Builder: Blythe
- Launched: 1810
- Fate: Wrecked 1816

General characteristics
- Tons burthen: 451 (bm)
- Armament: 1810: 12 × 12-pounder carronades; 1816: 6 × 18-pounder carronades

Lord Melville was launched at Blythe in 1810. Lloyd's Register reported her master as William Lewis, her owner as Holland & Co., and her trade as London–W__.

The Register of Shipping for 1816 gave the name of her master as Armnan, her owner as Hogg & Co., and her trade as London transport.

Lord Melville, Thomas Arman, master, was in company with Sea Horse and Boadicea on 30 January 1816. These ships were travelling together carrying soldiers and their families to Cork at the end of the Napoleonic War when all three wrecked, two with heavy loss of life.

Lord Melville failed to clear Kinsale Head and was driven onto a shoal 300 metres (330 yards) from the shore. However she did not break up. Her only losses occurred when a boat was launched containing four women, one child, and eight men; this boat foundered and only one person survived. The remainder of her crew and of the 479 passengers survived; they left the ship after the gale subsided overnight.
