= List of maritime disasters in the 19th century =

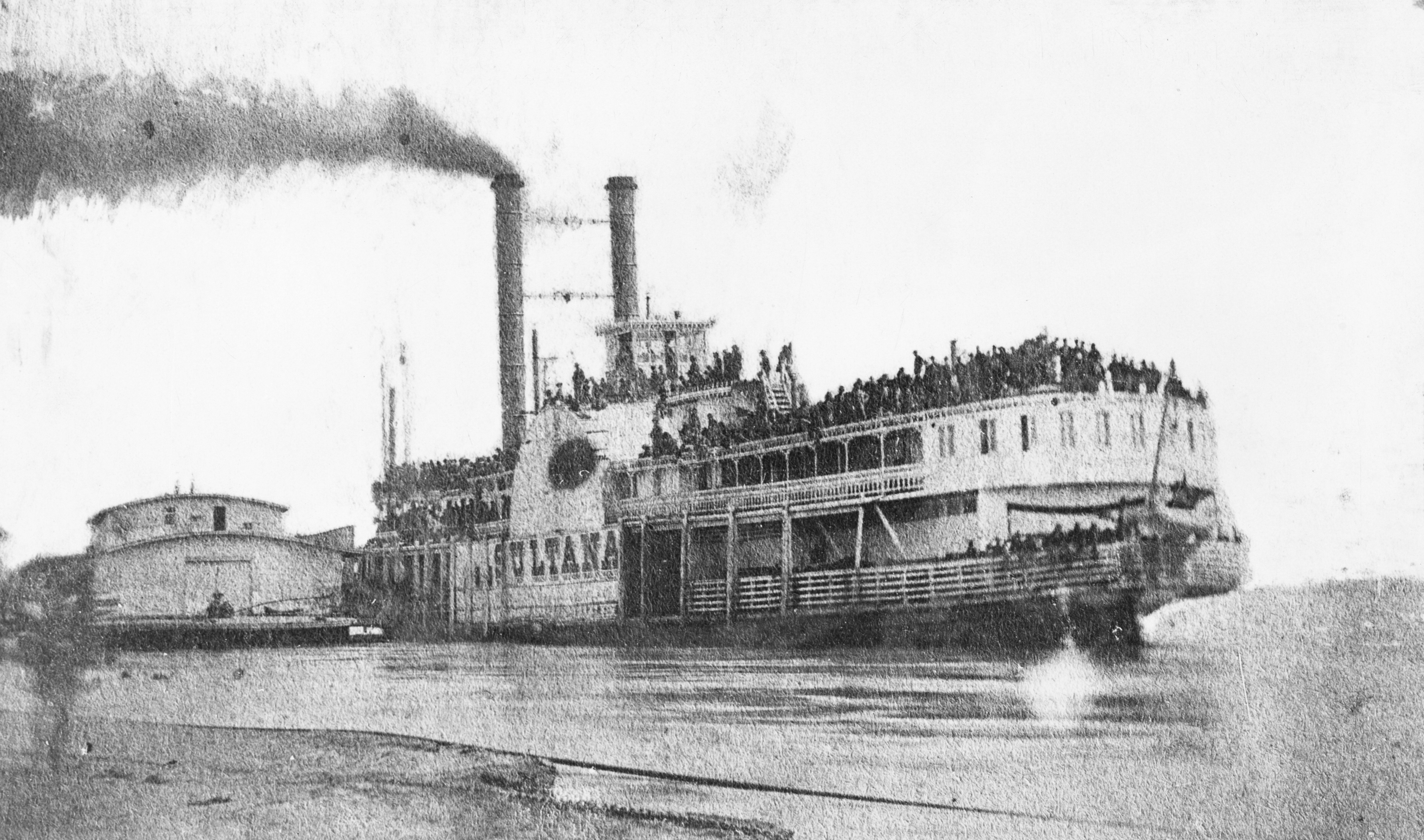
Sultana, one of the worst maritime disaster of the 19th century as well as the worst in U.S. history

A maritime disaster is an event which usually involves a ship or ships and can involve military action. Because of the nature of maritime travel, there is often a substantial loss of life. The term maritime disaster can refer to both commercial ships and military naval ships. A maritime disaster can result in one or more of the following simultaneously;

- Loss of life
- Pollution of marine environment (in case of oil spill, foul discharge of materials, sulphur emitted from fuels, etc.)
- Degradation of the aquatic ecosystem
- Economic loss at a grand scale
- Destruction of onshore properties (accidents at harbor are not only limited to the vessels but also damage the nearest lands)

There are countless incidents reported on marine disasters.

The following list covers those disasters where 30 or more lives were lost.

== Peacetime disasters ==
Many maritime disasters happen outside the realms of war. All ships, including those of the military, are vulnerable to problems from weather conditions, faulty design or human error. Some of the disasters below occurred in periods of conflict, although their losses were unrelated to any military action. The table listings are in descending order of the magnitude of casualties suffered.

Year	Country	Description	Deaths	Image
1865	United States	Sultana – On 27 April this Mississippi riverboat, steaming north with an excessive number of passengers on board, mainly Union army soldiers, suffered a series of boiler explosions which led to the ship catching fire. Per recent research, at least 1,164 passengers and crew were killed but some estimates put casualties high as 1,800, making it the worst maritime disaster in American history.	1,164+	
1822	China	Tek Sing – The Chinese junk was bound for Batavia, Dutch East Indies. On 6 February she tried a shortcut through the Gaspar Strait between Belitung and Bangka Islands and grounded on a reef. The junk sank in about 30 metres (100 ft) of water. The number of casualties is disputed but is over 1,000 with around 220 people saved.	≈ 1,000–1,400 (estimated)	
1807	United Kingdom	HMS Blenheim and HMS Java – While sailing in convoy to India both ships were lost without trace in a gale and are presumed to have foundered somewhere off Rodrigues. Blenheim was reported to be in poor shape and it is speculated that Java may have sunk while trying to rescue Blenheim's crew in the storm. About 280 men were lost from Java and 590 from Blenheim.	870	
1857	Russia	Lefort – On 22 September Lefort was in the Gulf of Finland en route from Reval to Kronstadt along with the ships Imperatritsa Aleksandra, Vladimir and Pamiat Asova. The ship had aboard 756 crew and officers along with 53 women, and 17 children who were families of the crew. The squadron was caught in a sudden squall and Lefort heeled over once, righted herself, then heeled over again and sank between the islands of Gogland and Bolshoy Tyuters with the loss of all 826 people aboard.	826	
1888	British India	Vaitarna – On 8 November, the ship went missing in a cyclonic storm off the coast of Saurashtra region of Gujarat.	746	
1811	United Kingdom	HMS St George – The second rate was wrecked near Ringkøbing on the west coast of Jutland on 24 December. She narrowly escaped wrecking on a shoal (Rødsand) south of Zeeland on 15 December, while returning from the Baltic Sea. Under jury masts and a temporary rudder she had got a considerable distance out of the Sleeve when a gale came up. This, combined with a heavy sea, resulted in St George being wrecked at Nazen, about three miles from Ringkøbing, together with HMS Defence. Seven of her 738 crew were saved. Among the dead were Rear-Admiral Robert Carthew Reynolds and Captain Daniel Oliver Guion.	731	
1800	Great Britain	HMS Queen Charlotte – a British 100-gun first-rate ship of the line that, on 17 March 1800, while serving as flagship of Vice-Admiral Lord Keith, was reconnoitering the Tuscan island of Capraia when she caught fire. She exploded and sank, killing 673 officers and men.	673	
1865	United States	William Nelson – While en route to New York City, the emigrant ship burned and sank on 26 June.	670	
1854	Peru	Grimenza – This Peruvian vessel was on the way from China with 800 Chinese coolies who were to dig for guano on the Chincha Islands when on 4 July it was wrecked on Bampton Reef about 500 miles east of Australia. At least 650 passengers lost their lives.	650	
1819	Spain	San Telmo – Damaged by severe weather in the Drake Passage, south of Cape Horn, it sank in September. The 644 officers, soldiers and seamen lost on board San Telmo were the first known people to die in Antarctica.	644	
1878	United Kingdom	SS Princess Alice – On 3 September the pleasure steamer was making what was billed as a "Moonlight Trip" to Gravesend and back. Bywell Castle collided with her off Tripcock Point. Princess Alice broke in two and sank within four minutes with an estimated 600 deaths.	600	
1811	United Kingdom	HMS Defence – on 24 December the third rate ran aground off the west coast of Jutland, Denmark. She was under the command of Captain D. Atkins and in the company of HMS St George, under Rear-admiral Robert Carthew Reynolds, and HMS Cressy, when a gale and heavy seas came up. St George was jury-rigged and so Atkins refused to leave her without the Admiral's permission. As a result, both were wrecked near Ringkøbing. Cressy did not ask for permission and so avoided wrecking. Defence lost all but 14 of her crew of 597 men and boys, including her captain. St George too lost almost her entire crew, including the admiral.	583	
1810	United Kingdom	HMS Minotaur – the third rate was wrecked off Texel in the Netherlands with heavy loss of life in December.	570	
1898	France	La Bourgogne – The passenger ship sank on 4 July after a collision in dense fog with the British ship Cromartyshire off Sable Island, Nova Scotia. La Bourgogne was carrying 725 passengers and crew, of whom 562 were lost.	562	
1891	United Kingdom	Utopia – Collided with HMS Anson while trying to enter the Bay of Gibraltar on 17 March. She sank in minutes, killing 562 passengers and crew. Two rescuers from HMS Immortalité also drowned; 318 survivors were rescued.	564	
1855	United Kingdom	Guiding Star – The clipper ship was lost with all hands, 481 passengers and 62 crew, during late February. The ship was last spotted on 12 February in the southern Atlantic Ocean and was heading into an area where large icebergs had been seen. At the time of her loss she was transporting immigrants from Great Britain to Australia.	543	
1873	United Kingdom	SS Atlantic – A British steam liner belonging to White Star Line. Ran aground on Golden Rule Rock on the coast of Nova Scotia on 1 April. The vessel was off course and traveling at night when it struck the coast, ripping out the ship's keel. Lifeboats could not be safely launched in the rough seas and the ship quickly listed trapping many passengers inside. Survivors were rescued using lines tied between the rocks and the shore. Of the 952 people on board, 535 perished. Among women and children, only one young boy survived.	535	
1890	Ottoman Empire	Ertuğrul – Sank on 16 September after striking a reef in a typhoon off Kushimoto, Japan. Over 500 sailors died, including Major General Ali Osman Pasha.	533	
1811	United Kingdom	HMS Hero – the 74-gun third rate was wrecked on the Haak Sands at the mouth of the Texel during a gale. All but 12 of her crew were lost.	518	
1804	United Kingdom	HMS York – the third rate left Woolwich under Captain Henry Mitford on the 26 December 1803 for a routine patrol in the North Sea but in January 1804 she struck Bell Rock in the North Sea off Arbroath and sank, killing all 491 men and boys aboard. Captain Mitford was the second son of the historian William Mitford.	491	
1854	United Kingdom	City of Glasgow – a British single-screw passenger steamship that disappeared en route from Liverpool to Philadelphia in January with 480 passengers and crew aboard.	480	
1870	United Kingdom	HMS Captain – On 7 September, the turret ship capsized and sank in high winds on the Atlantic Ocean. An estimated 480 sailors died and 18 survived.	480	
1858	Hamburg	Austria – On 1 September the ship caught fire while traveling from Hamburg to New York. The passing barque Maurice rescued most of the survivors and Catarina picked up more the next morning. As the blackened hulk was left to sink all but 65 of 538 passengers were lost.	473	
1874	United Kingdom	Cospatrick – The ship caught fire south of the Cape of Good Hope on 17 November while on a voyage from Gravesend, England, to Auckland, New Zealand. Three of 472 people aboard survived.	469	
1859	United Kingdom	Royal Charter – a steam clipper which was wrecked off the beach of Porth Alerth in Dulas Bay on the northeast coast of Anglesey on 26 October in a storm. The precise number of dead is uncertain as the complete passenger list was lost in the wreck although an incomplete list (not including those who boarded just before departure) is retained in the Victorian Archives Centre in, Victoria, Australia.	459	
1883	Germany	Cimbria (German article):– a German transatlantic liner of the Hamburg America Line, was in collision in fog with the British steamer Sultan, on 19 January off Borkum in the North Sea.	437	
1832	United Kingdom	Rival – Carrying volunteers from Glasgow to the Miguelist war, sank off Connemara on 4 December, with the loss of all on board.	432	
1857	United States	Central America – Sank off the Carolinas on a hurricane on 9 September. An estimated 425 out of 578 aboard died.	425	
1895	Spain	Reina Regente – the cruiser sank in a storm on 9 March, with the loss of all 420 crew.	420	Crucero Reina Regente (1888) 01
1895	Brazil	Terceira (2) – On January 6, 1895, a major ferry accident occurred when a faulty electrical installation caused a fire on the "Terceira", killing approximately 200 people.	200	Ferry Boat Terceira
1845	United Kingdom	Cataraqui – An emigrant ship bound for Australia, she struck a reef south-west of King Island, Tasmania, on 4 August. The sinking is Australia's highest civil maritime civil loss of life, killing 400 people.	400	
1801	United Kingdom	HMS Invincible – On 16 March, the third-rate was damaged in a storm and driven onto a sandbar off the coast of Norfolk. The following day Invincible drifted off the sandbar and sank in deep water. Over 400 crew were lost; 196 saved.	400	
1854	United Kingdom	RMS Tayleur – On 21 January, the Henry Wilson & Company clipper ship ran aground and sank on her maiden voyage off Lambay Island, Dublin Bay. Of 652 people aboard 380 were lost.	380	
1859	United States	Pomona – On 24 April the emigrant ship Pomona (1,181 tons) was wrecked on a sandbank off Ballyconigar. She was carrying mainly Irish emigrants from Liverpool to New York. 389 people lost their lives. The loss of life on Pomona was the sixth worst in Irish waters surpassed by Lusitania, Leinster, Norge, Tayleur and Rival.	389	
1810	British East India Company	Elizabeth – On 28 December she was wrecked in a storm on the outer banks of the Dunkirk brake. At least 380 persons were aboard on leaving Cork, Ireland, and it is thought that the number may have been as high as 400, including at least eight women, all of whom were lost. Among the survivors were six Britons and 15 lascars including two of the ship's crew.	380–400	
1856	United States	Driver – A clipper ship, Driver was lost with all hands in the Atlantic Ocean. No word was ever heard from her after she set sail from Liverpool with 344 passengers and 28 crew members on their way to New York. Her fate is a mystery, but some presumed she was lost in the heavy ice fields.	377	
1856	United States	John Rutledge – a full-rigged ship, John Rutledge struck an iceberg and sank in the Grand Banks of Newfoundland on 20 February. There was only one survivor.	~140+	
1878	United Kingdom	HMS Eurydice – On 24 March, the training ship was caught in a heavy snow storm off the Isle of Wight, capsized, and sank. Two of the ship's 378 crew and trainees survived; most of those who were not carried down with the ship died of exposure in the freezing waters.	376	
1815	British East India Company	Arniston – On 30 May, the East India Company ship was wrecked in a storm on the South African coast after a navigational error; 372 people were lost; 6 survived.	372	
1816	United Kingdom	Sea Horse – wrecked in Tramore Bay, Ireland, during storm 30 January. She had been chartered to carry members of the 2nd Battalion of the 59th (2nd Nottinghamshire) Regiment from Ramsgate to Cork. The two other ships carrying the rest of the battalion and members of another regiment were also wrecked nearby, killing a further 12 and 190 people respectively.	364	
1893	United Kingdom	HMS Victoria – Accidentally rammed by HMS Camperdown and sunk on 22 June when preparing to anchor off Tripoli in Syria (now part of Lebanon) when Vice Admiral George Tryon ordered two parallel lines of ships to turn toward each other. Of Victoria's 715 crew, 357 were rescued and 358 lost, including Tryon.	358	
1875	Germany	Schiller – On 7 May, the ship sank after hitting the Retarrier Ledges in the Isles of Scilly. Most of her crew and passengers were lost, totalling 335 fatalities.	355	
1854	United States	Arctic – a paddle steamer that sank 27 September off Cape Race, Newfoundland, after colliding with the French iron screw steamship Vesta in fog. Of about 430 passengers and crew aboard, more than 330 were lost, including all women and children.	332	
1853	United Kingdom	Annie Jane – was a passenger ship carrying immigrants that was damaged and sunk in a gale off the coast of Vatersay on 28 September. Of the 450 aboard 348 were lost.	348	
1806	United Kingdom	HMS Athenienne – On the evening of 20 October, she struck a submerged reef on the Esquirques, in the Strait of Sicily and sank. In all, 347 people died, 141 men and two women were rescued.	347	
1800	United States	USS Insurgent – On 29 April the frigate was ordered to cruise between the West Indies and the US coast to protect US shipping interests and to capture any enemy vessels encountered. Insurgent departed Baltimore 22 July and after a brief stop at Hampton Roads sailed for her station 8 August. Never heard from again, the frigate and her crew were presumed lost as a result of the severe storm which struck the West Indies on 20 September.	340	
1895	Germany	Elbe – Sank on 30 January after a collision with the steamship Crathie in the North Sea. One lifeboat with 20 people in it was recovered out of 354 on the ship.	334	
1856	Chile	Cazador – On 30 January the ship sailed from Talcahuano bound for Valparaíso carrying the 2nd Company of the Battalion Maipo and their families. The ship ran aground off Point Carranza south of Constitución: 307–400 people were lost and 23 rescued.	307–400	
1860	United States	Lady Elgin – The passenger steamer collided with the schooner Augusta of Oswego in a gale and sank in the early morning of 8 September, on Lake Michigan while en route from Chicago to Milwaukee, Wisconsin. The death of many political operatives greatly affected the political situation in Milwaukee, and the disaster resulted in new maritime rules requiring lights aboard vessels sailing at night.	≈ 300	
1887	United Kingdom	Kapunda – On 20 January the British emigrant ship sank after colliding with the barque Ada Melmoure off the coast of Brazil. Of the 314 aboard 299 were lost.	299	
1873	United Kingdom	Northfleet – On the night of 22 January she was at anchor about 2–3 nautical miles (3.7–5.6 km; 2.3–3.5 mi) off Dungeness. Around 22:30 hrs she was run down by the steamship Murillo that backed off and disappeared into the darkness. In the ensuing panic a total of 293 people were lost.	293	
1854	United States	New Era – On 13 November, the ship sank after grounding in a storm at Deal Beach in New Jersey. Of 427 people aboard, an estimated 284 were lost.	284	
1866	United States	Evening Star – On 6 October she sank after sailing into a hurricane 180 miles east of Tybee Island, Georgia. Of about 300 aboard, 283 were lost. The ship carried lifeboats for 60 people and too few life vests for all aboard. One group of survivors were picked up by a passing vessel and taken to the port of Savannah, while a second group drifted for days and came ashore on the north end of Amelia Island, Florida.	283	
1880	United Kingdom	HMS Juno – a training ship that disappeared with her entire crew after setting sail from Bermuda for Falmouth, England, on 31 January. It was presumed that she sank in a powerful storm which crossed her route a couple of weeks after she sailed between 12 and 16 February.	281	
1886	Japan	Unebi – In December, while en route from France to Japan with a French captain, Unebi disappeared without a trace somewhere in the South China Sea between Singapore and Yokohama. No survivor or wreckage were ever found and it is the only case of a ship vanishing without a trace in the annals of the Imperial Japanese Navy.	280	
1869	United States	Hermann – On 13 February the steamship was wrecked after striking a rock a mile off the coast Kwatzu, Japan. Between 275 and 300 of the 400 people on board were killed.	275–300	
1898	United States	USS Maine – On 15 February, while at anchor in Havana harbor, Cuba, an explosion of undetermined origin in the ship's magazine damaged and sank the ship. Of the 374 officers and men aboard, 266 died immediately, another eight died later from their injuries. The ship's sinking precipitated the Spanish–American War.	274	
1875	United States	Pacific – On 4 November the ship sank as a result of colliding with the steamship Orpheus southwest of Cape Flattery, Washington. Two of the 275 aboard survived.	273	
1878	Germany	SMS Grosser Kurfürst – The ironclad sank on her maiden voyage in a collision with the ironclad SMS König Wilhelm. The two ships, along with SMS Preussen were steaming in the English Channel on 31 May when they encountered a group of fishing boats and, in turning to avoid them, Grosser Kurfürst inadvertently crossed too closely to König Wilhelm. The latter rammed Grosser Kurfürst which sank in the span of about eight minutes taking between 269 and 276 of her crew with her.	269–276	
1805	British East India Company	Earl of Abergavenny – On 5 February the East Indiaman sank shortly after striking Shambles Bank near Portland Bill. Of the 402 people aboard 263 were lost, including her captain John Wordsworth Jr, brother of the poet William Wordsworth.	263	
1847	British East India Company	Cleopatra, with a crew of 151 carrying 100 convicts plus guard from Mumbai to Singapore sank during a tropical cyclone of the Malabar Coast on 14 April.	251+	
1854	United States	Powhattan – On 16 April, the ship sank off the coast of New Jersey in a severe storm, with no survivors. The loss of life was estimated by various sources to be between 250 and 311 people.	250–311	
1858	United States	Pennsylvania – On 13 June, the steamboat was on the Mississippi River near Ship Island, below Memphis, Tennessee, when her boiler exploded. Her passenger manifest was estimated at 450 and the initial loss of life at 250. The first vessel on site was Imperial, which picked up several passengers and took them to New Orleans. Diana took many others to Memphis. Several were seriously injured and the death toll increased. They included Mark Twain's younger brother Henry Clemens, whose skin and lungs were so badly scalded that he died of his wounds on 21 June. Eyewitnesses testified that the engineer was not at his post in the engine room just prior to the explosion, instead being in the company of some women.	250	
1850	United Kingdom	RMS Royal Adelaide – a paddle steamer that ran between London and Cork. On 30 March the ship was lost on the Tongue Sands north of Margate with the loss of all aboard.	250	
1847	United Kingdom	HMS Avenger – the frigate sailed from Gibraltar on 17 December bound for Malta. On 20 December she ran onto the Sorelle Rocks near Malta. Eight of her 250 crew survived.	242	
1847	United Kingdom	Exmouth – Wrecked against the Isle of Islay during a storm while carrying emigrants from Derry to Quebec. Three crew members survived.	241	
1850	United States	G. P. Griffith – On 17 June the paddle steamer caught fire and the ship's course altered towards the shore. G. P. Griffith's speed fanned the flames consuming the aft of the ship and forcing the passengers forward. The crew abandoned their posts causing G. P. Griffith's engines to run out of steam and the paddle wheels to slow and stop. However, the ship's momentum carried it forward until it hit a sandbar in water eight feet (2.4 m) deep less than half a mile from the beach. Flames quickly consumed the ship, burning to death anyone left aboard. Many passengers jumped into the water, where most drowned or were pulled under by other panicked passengers who could not swim.	241–289	
1863	United Kingdom	Anglo Saxon – On 27 April the steamship ran aground north of Cape Race, killing 237 people.	237	
1873	France	Ville du Havre – The liner Ville du Havre collided with Loch Earn in the mid-Atlantic on 22 November. Of 313 passengers and crew, 61 passengers and 26 crew survived. Loch Earn was also abandoned, with all 85 of her passengers and crew being rescued.	226	
1865	United States	Brother Jonathan – was a paddle steamer that struck an uncharted rock near Point St George, off Crescent City, California, on 30 July. The ship was carrying 244 passengers and crew with a large shipment of gold. 19 survived the wreck, making it the deadliest shipwreck up to that time on the US Pacific Coast.	225	
1835	United Kingdom	Neva – She was a convict ship that left Cork, Ireland, bound for Sydney, Australia. On 13 May she was wrecked on a reef near King Island, Tasmania. 224 people, mainly women and children, were lost.	224	
1866	United Kingdom	London – On 10 January, while travelling from Gravesend in England to Melbourne, Australia, a storm caught and sank the ship in the Bay of Biscay. Of the 239 aboard, 19 were rescued.	220	
1898	United States	Portland – On 26 November, the steamship left India Wharf in Boston, Massachusetts, for Portland, Maine, on a regularly scheduled run. She never reached her destination. None of the 192 passengers and crew survived the massive storm that also wreaked havoc on New England's coast – a storm that was later dubbed "The Portland Gale" after the loss of the ship.	192	
1870	United Kingdom	City of Boston – a British iron-hulled single-screw passenger steamship of the Inman Line which disappeared in the North Atlantic en route from Halifax, Nova Scotia, to Liverpool in January. A fierce gale and snowstorm took place two days after her departure which may have contributed to her loss. Collision with an iceberg was another explanation suggested at the time.	191	
1816	United Kingdom	Boadicea – wrecked in Courtmacsharry Bay, Ireland, during storm 30 January. The ship had been travelling in company with the Sea Horse and Lord Melville which were also both wrecked with heavy loss of life.	190	
1847	United States	Phoenix On 21 November, the screw steamer burned on Lake Michigan with the loss of at least 190 but perhaps as many as 250 lives.	190–250	
1842	United Kingdom	Waterloo – On 28 August the British convict ship was driven ashore, along with several other vessels, when a north-westerly gale struck Table Bay. The ship heeled over on her side and broke apart on the beach, killing 189 of the 302 persons aboard.	189	
1863	United Kingdom	HMS Orpheus – On 7 February Orpheus sank off the west coast of Auckland, New Zealand after grounding on a sand bar. Of the 259 aboard 189 were lost making it the highest maritime loss of life in New Zealand waters.	189	
1826	France	Nathalie – sank in ice off Newfoundland, British North America, in May, killing 189 of the 250 people aboard. She was en route from Granville, Manche, to Newfoundland.	189	
1856	United States	Pacific – a wooden-hulled sidewheel paddle steamer that disappeared with all hands sometime after she left Liverpool on 23 January. Contemporaries concluded she had probably hit an iceberg off Newfoundland, as the ice had been particularly extensive that year.	186	
1881	Canada	Victoria – A double-decked sternwheeler capsized and sank in the Thames River, Ontario, on 24 May, 182 people drowned.	182	
1848	United States	Ocean Monarch – Shortly after leaving Liverpool on 24 August the barque caught fire and eventually sank outside the harbor. Of 398 people aboard, 178 were lost.	178	
1893	Russia	Russalka – On 7 September the ironclad monitor sank in the Gulf of Finland in a storm while steaming from Reval to Helsingfors. All 177 of her crew were lost.	177	
1862	United States	Golden Gate – On 27 July the Pacific Mail steamship caught fire and burned 15 miles off the coast of Manzanillo, Mexico while traveling between San Francisco and Panama. Between 175 and 223 passengers and crew were killed.	175–223	
1890	United Kingdom	HMS Serpent – On the night of 10 November Serpent was caught in a heavy storm in the Bay of Biscay and attempted to reach shelter. She ran aground on Cape Vilan near the village of Camariñas in Galicia, northwest Spain and all but three of her crew were killed.	173	
1814	United States	USS Wasp – The sloop of war disappeared in October while heading for the Caribbean.	173	
1833	United Kingdom	Lady of the Lake – was an Aberdeen-built brig that sank off the coast of Newfoundland after striking ice on 11 May with the loss of up to 265 passengers and crew.	170–265	
1853	United Kingdom	Madagascar – The full-rigged ship disappeared without a trace after sailing from Melbourne for London, with the loss of about 110 passengers and about 50 crew.	160	
1852	United States	Atlantic – the steamship sank after being in collision with the steamship Ogdensburg on Lake Erie off Long Point on 20 August. Of more than 500 people aboard, an estimated 150–200 people were lost.	150–200	
1857	United Kingdom	Tempest – While on a return trip from New York to Glasgow that left 13 February, the steamship vanished with 150 on board.	150	
1858	United Kingdom	HMS Sappho – It is believed that HMS Sappho foundered with all hands during February off the southeast coast of Australia.	147	
1854	United Kingdom	HMS Prince – The stores ship was destroyed on 14 November at a deep water anchorage off Balaklava by a hurricane-force storm which tore her from her anchorage and dashed her onto rocks. She broke up completely within ten minutes; six of her 150 crew were saved.	144	
1881	United Kingdom	HMS Doterel – The sloop sank at anchor off Punta Arenas after an explosion on 26 April killing 143 members of a crew of 155, while on her way to join the Pacific Station.	143	
1894	New Zealand	Wairarapa (New Zealand) – On 29 October the steamship, en route from Sydney to Auckland, ran into Great Barrier Island. She was traveling at nearly full speed through heavy fog. About 140 out of 230 people aboard were lost.	140	
1840	United States	Lexington – On 13 January the paddlewheel steamboat was en route from Manhattan to Stonington, when a casing around her smokestack caught fire and ignited nearly 150 bales of cotton cargo nearby. The fire could not be extinguished and the ship was abandoned. Her overcrowded lifeboats sank almost immediately after launch, leaving almost all her passengers and crew in freezing water. Of the estimated 143 people aboard, four survived by clinging to floating bales of cotton.	139	
1841	United Kingdom	President – On 11 March the British passenger liner, with 136 passengers and crew and an extensive cargo manifest, encountered a gale. She was seen on her second day out laboring in heavy seas in a dangerous area between Nantucket Shoals and Georges Bank and was not seen again.	136	
1890	United Kingdom	RMS Quetta – was a British-India Steam Navigation Company ship on a regular route between Great Britain, India and the Far East. She was wrecked on the Far North Queensland coast on 28 February. Of 292 people aboard, 134 were lost.	134	
1833	United Kingdom	Amphitrite – The ship sailed from Woolwich, England, on 25 August with 108 women convicts and 12 children. While off Boulogne, France she encountered a gale and was blown ashore on 31 August. The captain refused offers of aid from the shore as prisoners were aboard. The ship then broke up, killing 133 people; three crewmen survived.	133	
1881	New Zealand	Tararua – The passenger steamship struck the reef off Waipapa Point in The Catlins on 29 April in New Zealand's highest civilian shipping loss of life. Of 151 passengers and crew aboard, 20 survived.	131	
1892	United Kingdom	Bokhara – A steamship that sank in a typhoon on 10 October, off the coast of Formosa, killing 150 people.	150	
1870	United States	USS Oneida – The sloop-of-war sank on 24 January off Yokohama, Japan, after the British steamship City of Bombay collided with her and sailed off without giving assistance. Japanese fishing boats saved 61 sailors but 125 men died.	125	
1883	United Kingdom	Daphne – capsized and sank moments after her naming and launching at a shipyard in Govan, Glasgow, Scotland, on 3 July. When launched, she had a work crew aboard to continue fitting out the ship. Although 70 people were saved, an estimated 124–195 died, which included many young boys.	124–195	
1882	Canada	Asia – On 14 September Asia sank in bad weather near Lonely Island in Georgian Bay with a loss of 123 lives. The doomed vessel had been fitted with flimsy lifeboats which repeatedly overturned in the heavy waters leaving only two survivors.	123	
1867	United Kingdom	RMS Rhone – On 29 October the passenger liner was wrecked off the coast of Salt Island in the British Virgin Islands in a hurricane killing about 123 people.	123	
1857	United Kingdom	Dunbar – She was wrecked near the entrance to Sydney Harbour, Australia, killing 121 people.	121	
1861	Prussia	SMS Amazone – On 14 November, off the coast of the Netherlands, the Prussian training vessel sank in a storm, killing 107 of 145 aboard.	107	
1898	United Kingdom	Mohegan – The steamship sank off Cornwall after hitting a reef on 14 October, killing 106 people; 40 were rescued by shore-based lifeboat.	106	
1852	United Kingdom	RMS Amazon – The paddle steamer caught fire and sunk during her maiden voyage, 4 January, off the Isles of Scilly.	105–115	
1899	United Kingdom	Stella – the British passenger ferry was wrecked on a submerged reef on 30 March, 105 of the 190 passengers and crew aboard were lost.	105	
1865	United States	Pewabic – On 9 August the package freighter Pewabic sank due to collision with her sister vessel Meteor off Thunder Bay Island in Lake Huron. There was significant loss of life with a number variously estimated between 100 and 125 passengers and crew.	100–125	
1884	United States	City of Columbus – the passenger steamship ran aground off Massachusetts in January. About 100 people froze to death or drowned, 29 were saved by rowboats from the shore and a revenue cutter.	100	
1809	United Kingdom	Meikle Ferry – On 16 August, while crossing Dornoch Firth in clear weather conditions, the overloaded ferry capsized with ninety-nine of the estimated 111 people on board dying.	99	
1875	United Kingdom	Gothenburg – A steamship that was wrecked on the Barrier Reef off the north Queensland coast, in a cyclone-strength storm, killing between 98 and 112 persons; 22 survived.	98–112	
1850	United Kingdom	Edmond – A chartered passenger sailing vessel that was driven ashore by a storm and broke in two just off the coast of Kilkee, County Clare on 19 November. About 98 people were lost.	98	
1877	United States	USS Huron – On 23 November the ship left for a scientific cruise on the coast of Cuba. She soon encountered heavy weather and was wrecked shortly after 0100 hrs on 24 November near Nags Head, North Carolina. For a time her crew worked in relatively little danger, attempting to free their ship but she soon heeled over, carrying 98 officers and men to their deaths.	98	
1890	United States	Sea Wing – On 13 July a strong squall line overturned the excursion vessel on Lake Pepin near Lake City, Minnesota. About 215 people were aboard the vessel when it was overturned and as a result 98 people drowned. An excursion barge that was being towed by the Sea Wing was unharmed. It is one of the worst maritime disasters that has occurred on the upper Mississippi River.	98	
1864	United Kingdom	HMS Bombay – During target practice off the coast of Uruguay on 14 December 1864 a fire broke out aboard the British screw warship Bombay. The fire spread quickly and eventually reached the magazine, destroying the ship. 93 were killed out of a crew of 619.	93	
1847	United States	Stephen Whitney – On 10 November, while sailing in thick fog, Captain C.W. Popham mistook the Crookhaven lighthouse for the one at the Old Head of Kinsale on the south coast of Ireland. About 10 pm the ship struck the western tip of West Calf Island and completely broke up within ten minutes. Of 110 people aboard, 92 were lost.	92	
1800	United States	USS Pickering – Ordered to join Commodore Thomas Truxton's squadron on the Guadeloupe Station in the West Indies, she sailed from Newcastle, Delaware on 20 August, and was never heard from again. She is presumed to have been lost with all hands in a gale in September, but this was never proven. This storm is also thought to have sunk the USS Insurgent, which vanished without a trace. The exact cause of the cutter's disappearance remains a mystery.	90	
1837	United States	Home – On 7 October the packet ship struck a sandbar off New Jersey. Unaware of the extent of the damage, her captain continued toward Charleston, South Carolina when she encountered the 1837 Racer's Storm. She started shipping water as she rounded Cape Hatteras and was put aground to ride out the developing storm. Before a rescue could be effected the next day, surf broke her up, killing 90 people.	90	
1881	Netherlands	Koning der Nederlanden – Her shaft broke on 4 October and she sank the next day 400 miles of Chagos Archipelago. Three life boats with c. 90 passengers and crew were never found.	90	
1859	South Australia	Admella – On 6 August the passenger steamship was wrecked on a submerged reef off Carpenter Rocks, southwest of Mount Gambier, South Australia. Survivors clung to the wreck for over a week and many people took days to die within sight of land and saw successive rescue attempts fail. Of 113 people aboard there were 24 survivors, including only one woman, Bridget Ledwith. Of 89 dead, 14 were children.	89	
1878	United States	Metropolis – On 31 January, the wooden steamship sank off the North Carolina coast killing 85 people.	85	
1865	United Kingdom	Comet – On 13 April fire broke out aboard the clipper ship in the cargo of wool while heading from Moreton Bay, Queensland, Australia, for London. The captain and all 80 passengers abandoned ship in three boats and were lost. On 17 April, just as Comet was about to sink, the 17 crew members remaining aboard were rescued by the British barque Dauntless.	81	
1825	British East India Company	Kent – On 1 March, in the Bay of Biscay, the East India Company ship caught fire, exploded, and sank. Of those aboard 547 were rescued; 81 were lost.	81	
1813	United Kingdom	Currach Fishing Tragedy – On 11 February, 200 currachs were fishing off Bruckless Bay, Donegal. The shoal of herring moved out to sea, followed by the fragile boats. A sudden storm capsized most of them. Over 80 fishermen drowned	80	
1880	United States	Alpena – The sidewheel paddle steamer capsized and sank on Lake Michigan in the "Big Blow" storm of 15 October. An estimated 80 people were lost.	80	
1892	Japan	Chishima – The cruiser was lost one week after her formal commissioning into the Japanese navy. On 30 November the British P&O cargo ship Ravenna struck Chishima amidships cutting her into two off Matsuyama, Ehime in poor weather. Her captain and 74 crew were lost but Ravenna suffered only minor damage.	75	
1893	United Kingdom	Naronic – The ship was lost at sea after leaving Liverpool on 11 February bound for New York, with the loss of all 74 people aboard. The ship's fate remains a mystery.	74	
1882	Netherlands	HNLMS Adder – Sunk on 5 July	65	
1807	United Kingdom	HMS Anson – The frigate was wrecked off Loe Bar, Cornwall, on 29 December. The previous day she had been driven onto a lee shore by a gale while attempting to return to Falmouth. She had anchored, but the first anchor rope snapped at 4 am. The ships smaller anchor rope broke at 7 am and now with no anchor the captain attempted to beach the ship but she hit the rocks broadside. The mainmast broke and fell onto the beach and some men managed to get ashore. Estimates of the number of people lost vary from 60 to 190.	60–190	
1897	United Kingdom	Falls of Bracklinn – The steamship sailed from Baltimore on 2 January bound for Avonmouth with a cargo of grain. After she anchored overnight at Thomas Point because of fog, the pilot left her off Cape Henry at 9 p.m. on 3 January. She was never seen again.	56	
1857	United States	Louisiana – The steamship burned during the night of 31 May in the Gulf of Mexico, several miles off the coast of Galveston, Texas. The vessel, in the Southern Steamship Company fleet, was en route from New Orleans to Galveston. A fire broke out amidships, which prevented communication and hampered the crew's attempts to fight the fire.	55	
1895	United Kingdom	Catterthun – On 7 August, after leaving Sydney bound for Hong Kong the ship ran into a gale just after midnight near Point Stephens Light. A few hours later, near Seal Rocks, she hit a reef, was badly damaged and sank within 20 minutes. 55 people were lost; one lifeboat with 26 survivors reached shore with the aid of a local sailing boat.	55	
1865	United Kingdom	City of Dunedin – The side wheel paddle steamer wrecked in Cook Strait near Cape Terawhiti on 20 May while sailing from Wellington to Hokitika via Nelson, New Zealand with the loss of all on board.	52	
1844	United States	Lucy Walker – On 23 October, the sidewheel steamboat was en route from Louisville, Kentucky, to New Orleans when her three boilers exploded; she caught fire and sank mid-stream in the Ohio River about 4 miles (6.4 km) below New Albany, Indiana. Débris and body parts were washed up on both banks of the river. Since passenger and crew lists were lost, estimates range from 50 to 100 people lost, with some 50 survivors. The boat may have been racing another vessel, her captain driving Lucy Walker's engines too hard.	50–100	
1820	United States	USS Lynx – Lynx departed St. Mary's, Georgia, on 11 January, bound for Kingston, Jamaica, to continue her service suppressing pirates. She was never seen nor heard from again, and despite the searching of schooner Nonsuch, no trace of her or her 47-man crew was ever found.	47	
1876	United Kingdom	HMS Thunderer – On 14 July, shortly after completion, the ironclad turret ship suffered a disastrous boiler explosion which killed 45 people. One of her eight 30 lb_{f}/in^{2} (210 kPa) box boilers burst as she proceeded from Portsmouth Harbour to Stokes Bay to carry out a full-power trial.	45	
1860	United Kingdom	Nimrod – On 28 February the paddle steamer was driven aground at St David's Head during a gale. The ship broke apart and sunk with the loss of all on board.	45	
1864	United Kingdom	Bohemian – On 22 February the three-masted iron-hulled ship struck an underwater ledge at Casco Bay, Maine while attempting to enter the harbor. With the hull damaged and taking on water the ship grounded on another ledge approximately a quarter mile from shore then sank. 42 of the 317 on board died in the evacuation of the ship.	42	
1896	United Kingdom	The Victory – On 14 June 1894, a hooker was carrying 126 mostly young people from Achill Island to meet the SS Elm in Clew Bay for transportation to Scotland when the hooker capsized.	32	

== Wartime disasters ==
Disasters with high losses of life can occur in times of armed conflict. Shown below are some of the known events with major losses.

Year	Country	Description	Lives lost	Image
1801	Spain	Second Battle of Algeciras – On the moonless night of 12 July, the large Spanish warships Real Carlos and San Hermengildo fired on one another, each mistaking her consort for a British opponent. Fires that broke out aboard both ships subsequently reached their powder magazines and exploded, destroying the ships and killing the majority of their combined complement of over 2,000 sailors.	1,700+	
1805	France	Indomptable – Sank in a storm on 22 October in the Battle of Trafalgar. Of 1,200 aboard, 1,050 were lost.	1,050	
1894	China	Kowshing – In the Battle of Pungdo on 25 July, the troop transport Kowshing was sunk by Japanese cruiser Naniwa. More than 800 soldiers on Kowshing were killed. Some 300 Chinese troops survived by swimming to nearby islands. Only 3 out of the 43 British crew survived the sinking, including captain Thomas Ryder Galsworthy.	840+	
1855	France	Sémillante – On 15 February the French frigate was carrying troops in the Crimean War when she was caught in a storm in the Strait of Bonifacio near the Lavezzi Islands. Lost in a thick fog, a gust of wind drove her into rocks on Lavezzo, and about midnight she sank. Her complement was 301 and she was carrying 392 troops. No-one survived.	693	
1805	France	Achille – at the Battle of Trafalgar the Téméraire-class ship of the line caught fire, exploded and sank, killing 480 of her 638 crew.	480	
1805	France	Redoutable – After being captured at the Battle of Trafalgar, Redoutable sank in a storm on 22 October. Of 643 aboard, 474 were lost in the battle and sinking.	474	
1812	Spain	Salvador – On 1 September, the Spanish transport ship (popularly known as El Triunfo) carrying the 29th Albuera Infantry Regiment to reinforce besieged Montevideo sank in the Bay of Maldonado (modern-day Uruguay) during a severe storm. To maximize room for the regiment, a large portion of the crew had been left behind in Cádiz. Consequently, the undermanned crew maneuvered too slowly while attempting to seek shelter. Unable to complete the necessary tacks to reach safety, the vessel struck the shallow bottom before running hard aground on its stern off Playa Mansa. Out of roughly 600 people on board, only 130 survived.	~470–500	
1852	United Kingdom	HMS Birkenhead – The troopship struck a rock near Cape Town on 26 February while ferrying troops to the 8th Xhosa War. There were insufficient serviceable lifeboats for all the passengers, and the soldiers famously stood in ranks on board, allowing the women and children to board the boats safely and escape the sinking. This incident is credited with starting the "Women and Children First" rule that affected the Titanic disaster decades later. Of the estimated 643 aboard, 193 survived.	450	
1807	United Kingdom	The troopships Rochdale and Prince of Wales – Bound for the Napoleonic war were caught by a storm in Dublin Bay and lost on 19 November. More than 400 people were lost.	400	
1866	Italy	Re d'Italia – The Italian ironclad frigate was rammed and sunk by the Austro-Hungarian flagship SMS Erzherzog Ferdinand Max in the Battle of Lissa on 20 July. After being rammed, the ironclad quickly capsized and sank with the loss of 27 officers and 364 men out of a crew of 558. Other sources reported 440 dead and 160 survivors, or 177 survivors.	391	
1805	United Kingdom	Aeneas – On 23 October the British troopship was wrecked after striking a reef on the Newfoundland coast in a storm. Seven of the 347 aboard survived.	340	
1894	China	Jingyuan – In the Battle of the Yalu River on 17 September a Japanese squadron led by Admiral Tsuboi Kozo, with the ships Yoshino, Takachiho, Akitsushima and Naniwa, concentrated fire on Jingyuan for more than an hour. Briefly, Jingyuan seemed to be closing on Yoshino in an attempt to ram but at 16:48 she lurched to starboard and burst into flames. Soon after, with a large explosion, Jingyuan rolled over and sank. Of 270 crew, seven survived.	263	
1807	United Kingdom	HMS Ajax – Just prior to the Dardanelles operation a fire destroyed the third-rate. It broke out on 14 February in the bread-room, where the purser and his assistant had negligently left a light burning, while Ajax was anchored off Tenedos. As the fire burned out of control the officers and crew were forced to take to the water. 250 or her crew died, while 380 were rescued.	250	
1894	China	Zhiyuan – In the Battle of the Yalu River on 17 September Zhiyuan was hit in the bow by a shell fired by either Naniwa or Takachiho at 15:50 hours which caused a great explosion after which she rapidly sank. Of her 252 officers and men, 245 were lost.	245	
1866	Italy	Palestro – The Italian ironclad screw gunboat was set afire and later exploded in the Battle of Lissa, on 20 July. The explosion killed 19 officers and 193 men; 23 survived. Other sources report 231 dead and 19 survivors, or 228 dead and 26 survivors, or 227 casualties out of a crew of 269.	212–231	
1895	China	Laiyuan – In the Battle of Weihaiwei on 5 February the Chinese cruiser was attacked by two Japanese torpedo boats and struck by a torpedo fired by Kotaka. Laiyuan rolled over and capsized with a loss of about 170 of her crew of 270.	170	
1879	Chile	Esmeralda – On 21 May, during the War of the Pacific, Esmeralda engaged the Huáscar in the Battle of Iquique. Despite the material superiority of the Peruvian ship the battle lasted for over three hours. The captain of Esmeralda, Arturo Prat, was killed while leading an attempt to board the enemy vessel and Huáscar eventually sank Esmeralda.	135	
1861	United States	USS Congress – On 8 March Congress was anchored off Newport News, Virginia, as part of the Union blockade when she fell under attack by the Confederate ironclad CSS Virginia (ex-USS Merrimack) and five other small ships. The ironclad along with the other ships attacked from a distance and inflicted great damage on the ship, killing 120, including the commanding officer. After being fired upon with several rounds of hot shot (red-hot cannonballs) and incendiary, Congress burned to the water's edge, with her magazine exploding. She then sank by the stern.	120	
1807	United Kingdom	HMS Primrose – In January the brig-sloop sailed for Spain as part of a convoy. In a snowstorm she ran aground at 5 am on 22 January on Minstrel Rock, The Manacles, a mile offshore, and was wrecked. The sole survivor was a drummer boy.	120	
1809	United Kingdom	HMS Lark – On 3 August the sloop foundered in a gale off Cape Causada (Point Palenqua), Santo Domingo. She was at anchor when the gale struck and had set sail at daybreak to get out to sea. While she was shortening sail a squall struck that turned her on her side. A heavy sea struck her and she filled rapidly with water. She sank within 15 minutes, killing most of her crew. Some survived by clinging to floating wreckage. However, by evening when the brig-sloop HMS Moselle arrived all but three of her 120 crew were dead.	117	
1864	United States	USS Tecumseh – The Canonicus-class monitor was sunk by a mine on 5 August in the Battle of Mobile Bay. She capsized and rests upside down northwest of Fort Morgan. Of 100 aboard, 94 were lost.	94	

== See also ==
- List of maritime disasters
- List of roll-on/roll-off vessel accidents
- List of ships sunk by submarines by death toll
- Lists of shipwrecks
- Lists of disasters
