= William Blake Fisher =

Royal Navy Admiral (1853–1926)

Admiral William Blake Fisher CB
- Born: 19 February 1853
- Died: 8 May 1926 (aged 73)
- Military career
- Allegiance: United Kingdom
- Branch: Royal Navy
- Rank: Admiral
- Commands: HMS Anson
- Awards: Companion of the Order of the Bath

Admiral William Blake Fisher CB (19 February 1853 – 8 May 1926) was a Royal Navy officer.

== Naval career ==
Fisher was promoted to lieutenant in the Royal Navy on 30 January 1877. Promoted to captain on 31 December 1896, he was given command of the battleship HMS Anson at Queensferry in 1902 and, having been promoted to rear admiral on 23 November 1906, went on to be second-in-command of the Atlantic Fleet in 1908.
