= SS Tempest =

History
- Owner: Anchor Line
- Port of registry: Glasgow United Kingdom
- Builder: Sandeman & McLaurin
- Launched: 21 December 1854
- Fate: Vanished c. February 1857

General characteristics
- Tonnage: 866 GRT
- Length: 214 ft (65 m)
- Beam: 28 ft (8.5 m)
- Draft: 19 ft (5.8 m)
- Propulsion: 150 hp (110 kW) Steam engines

SS Tempest was the first ship of the Anchor Line belonging to Scottish brothers Nicol and Robert Handyside and Captain Thomas Henderson. The 214-foot (65 m), 866-ton ship was built as a sail-ship by Sandeman & McLaurin of Glasgow and launched on 21 December 1854. On 3 April 1855 Henderson began a maiden voyage from Glasgow to Bombay.

The Anchor Line decided to begin transatlantic service between Glasgow and New York City with Tempest. She was converted to a screw steamship with the fitting, by Randolf and Elder, of 150 horsepower (110 kW) engines in 1856. Her first passage left Glasgow on 11 October 1856; sailing from New York on 19 November, she returned to Glasgow after a 28-day crossing.

Her second journey departed Glasgow 27 December, mastered by Capt James Morris, with cargo and 50 passengers. She arrived in New York on 1 February. She sailed eastward on 13 February 1857 with crew, cargo and one passenger aboard. She vanished without a trace. Her fate remains an unsolved mystery to this day along with the 150 people that were on board.

Two other ships of the Anchor Line disappeared at sea; United Kingdom in 1869 and Ismailia in 1873.
