= Anchor Line (steamship company) =

Former Scottish steamship company

- house flag
- Industry: Ship transport
- Founded: 1855
- Founder: Thomas Henderson
- Defunct: 1980
- Headquarters: Glasgow, Scotland
- Parent: Cunard Line

Anchor Line was a Scottish merchant shipping company that was founded in 1855 and dissolved in 1980.

== Background ==
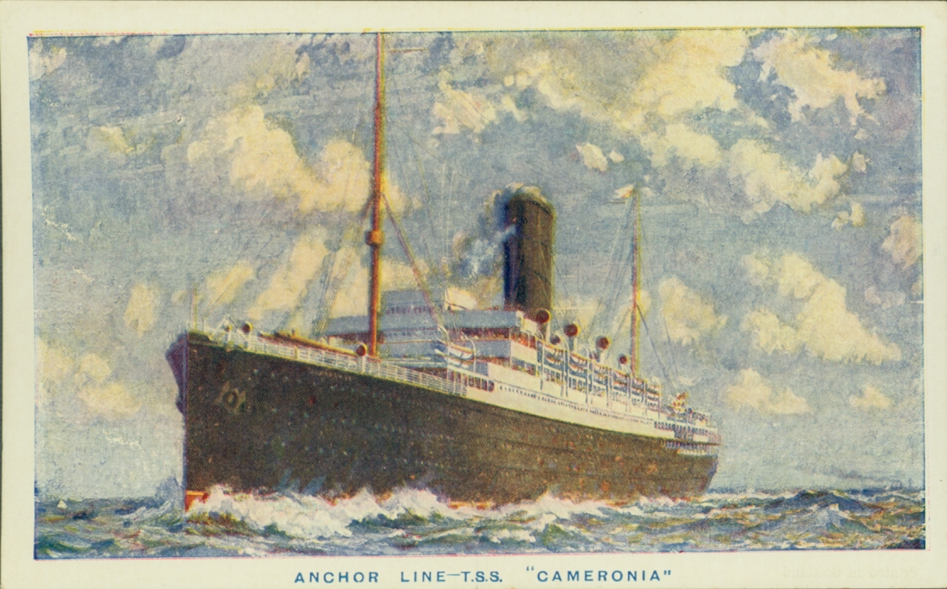
Anchor's 16,297 GRT liner RMS Cameronia (1919), a sister ship of the Cunarder RMS Lancastria

The Anchor Line shipping company grew from small beginnings in tandem with the River Clyde shipbuilding industry as the Glasgow river was transformed. In the 19th century rapid industrialisation the Clyde changed from a shallow meandering river into one of the industrialised world's greatest ports and a hub of shipbuilding and marine engineering expertise.

From the 1880s until the 1940s the company was famous for its sleek ships and the comfort it offered its passengers at a very affordable cost. While not as large or famous as Cunard or P&O, the Anchor Line built up a reputation for value and became well known for employing some of the finest marine artists of the day to create its beautiful posters. It also played on its Scottish roots and employed Scottish crew and cabin crew, advertising "Scottish ships and Scottish crew for Scottish passengers".

== Beginnings ==
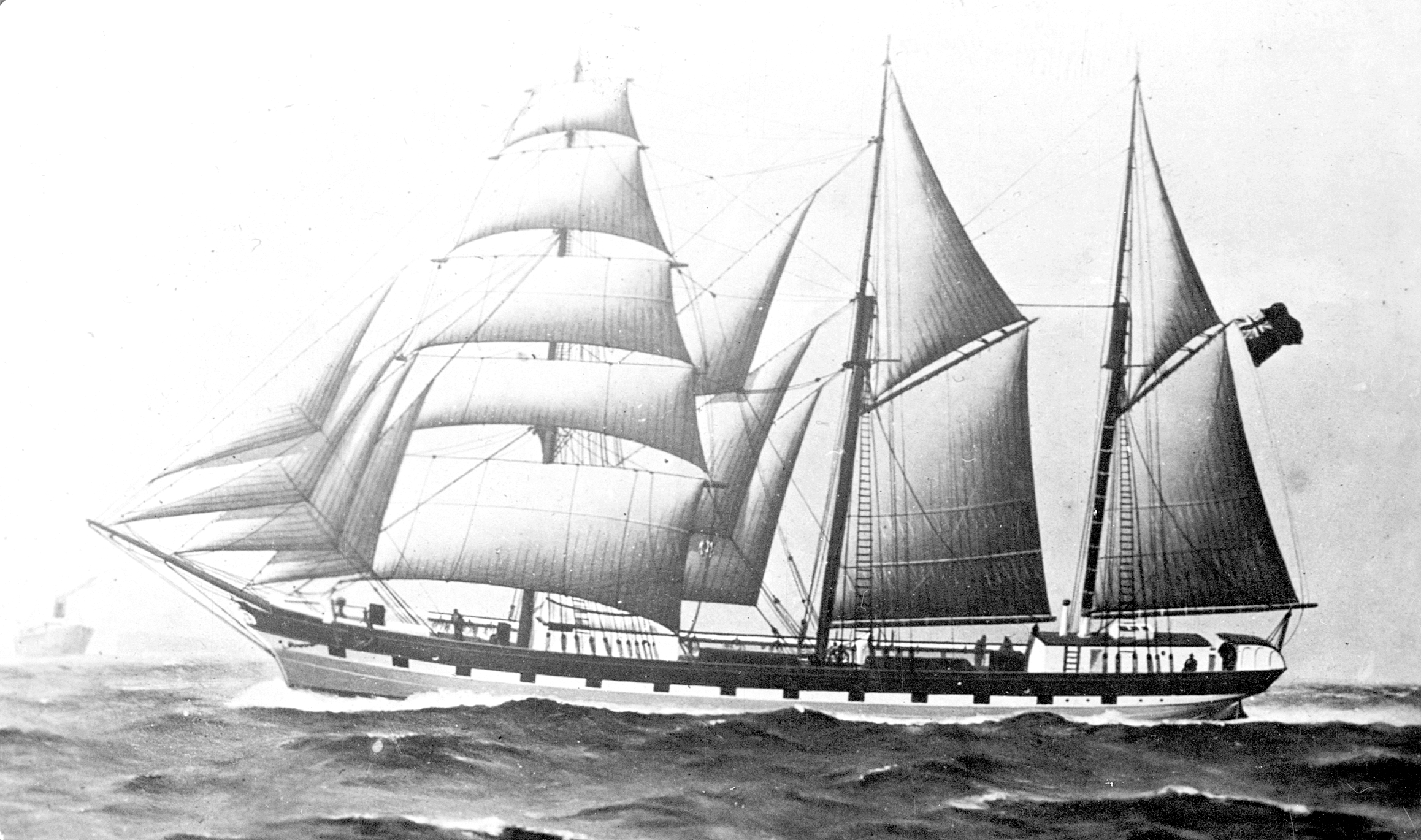
The 255 GRT barquentine Ailsa Craig was built for Handyside and Henderson in 1860 and lost at sea in 1865

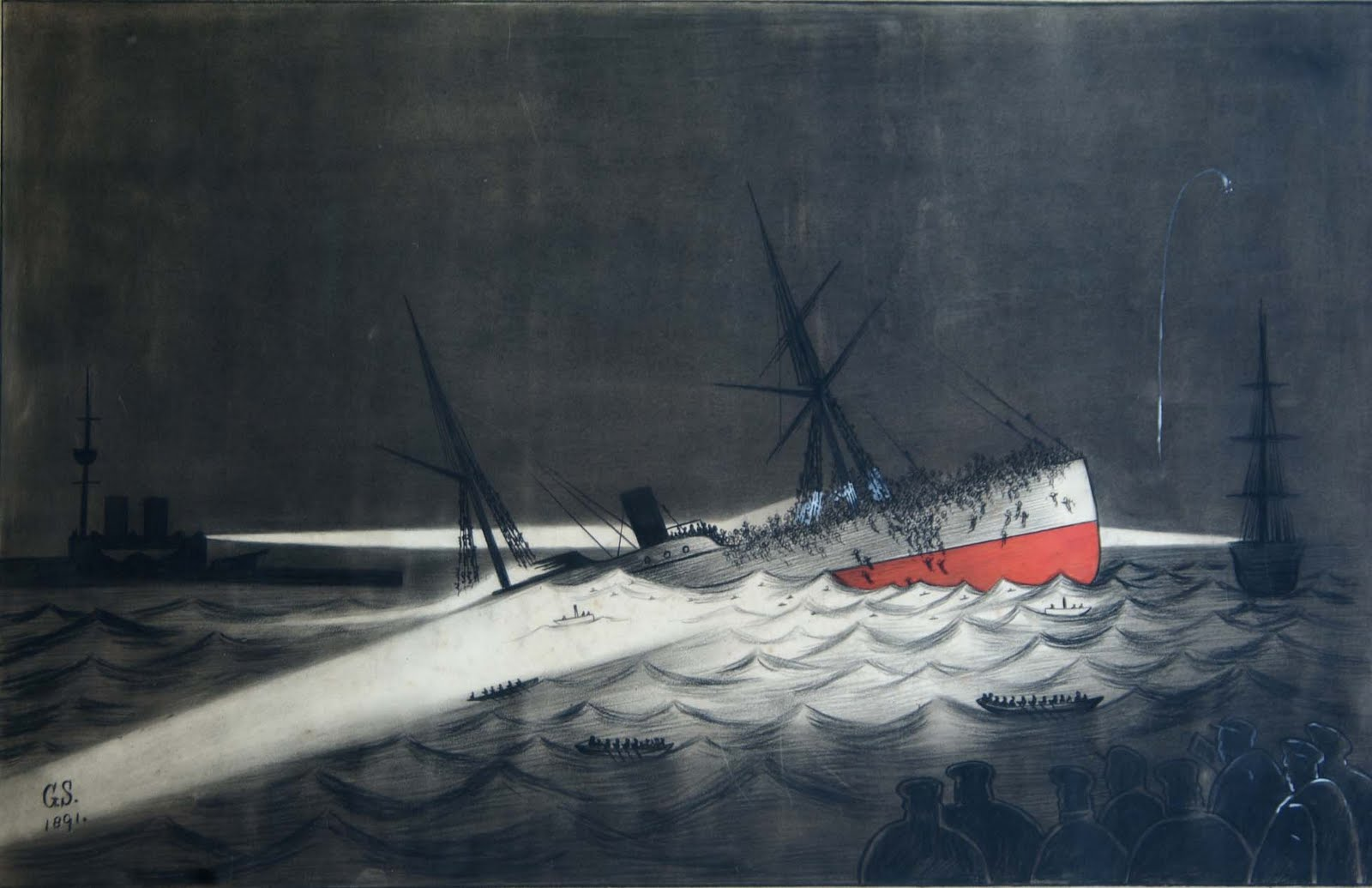
Eyewitness painting of the sinking of Utopia in 1891

The company began in 1855 when Captain Thomas Henderson from Fife became a partner in the shipping agent firm of N & R Handyside & Co, of Glasgow who operated a few sailing vessels. This resulted in the formation of the company Handysides & Henderson with the aim of establishing a New York service.

At first they only operated to India under sail, in 1856 the company advertised it was to begin transatlantic sailings and the sailing ship Tempest was sent to Randolf and Elder, to have 150 horsepower compound steam engines installed In October of that year the first Anchor Line service to New York set sail. Unfortunately, the following year the Tempest was lost at sea. She left New York, commanded by Captain James Morris on 13 February 1857, bound for Glasgow, but was never heard of again. Rumour had it that she had only one passenger aboard.

== Expansion ==
After some initial struggles however, by 1866 the company was operating weekly sailings from Glasgow and had also initiated services to the Mediterranean, Calcutta and Bombay (once the Suez Canal had opened). In 1873, ownership of the company was completely transferred to the Henderson family, being Thomas, his brother John who had joined the company a few years earlier and their two other brothers, David and William. The brothers lost no time in acquiring a shipyard at Meadowside and it operated under the name D & W Henderson 32 ships for the Anchor Line over several decades.

Despite successes, in the first 50 years of operation more than 20 ships were lost. The worst of these was in 1891 when the Utopia collided with the battleship HMS Anson in harbour at Gibraltar and sank with the loss of more than 500 lives.

== Cunard ==
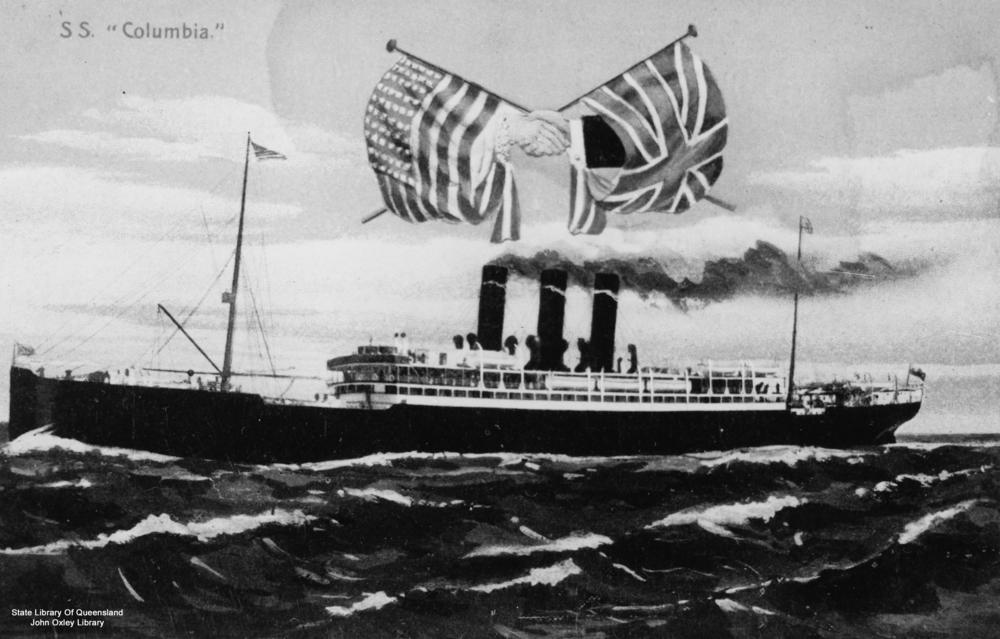
Columbia was a 8,292 GRT passenger liner built for Anchor Line in 1902 and sold in 1926

Upon the death of the Henderson brothers, towards the end of the 19th century, the company restructured, becoming Anchor Line (Henderson Brothers) Ltd. in 1899, building large new offices on St.Vincent Street, modernising much of its fleet and in 1910 moving its berth to the newly built Yorkhill Quay. Its success drew the attention of the Cunard Line and in 1911 the Anchor Line was effectively taken over and the chairman of Cunard became the chairman of the Anchor Line.

In the First World War Anchor Line lost ships to enemy action including the 10,968 GRT Cameronia, 8,662 GRT California, 14,348 GRT SS Tuscania (1914), and 14,348 GRT Transylvania the following month. In the 1920s they were replaced by the 16,297 GRT RMS Cameronia, 16,923 GRT RMS Transylvania, 16,792 GRT SS California (1923), and 16,991 GRT SS Tuscania (1921)

Anchor Line struggled in the Great Depression of the 1930s. In 1935 Cunard withdrew from the company and Anchor went into liquidation.

== Decline and fate ==
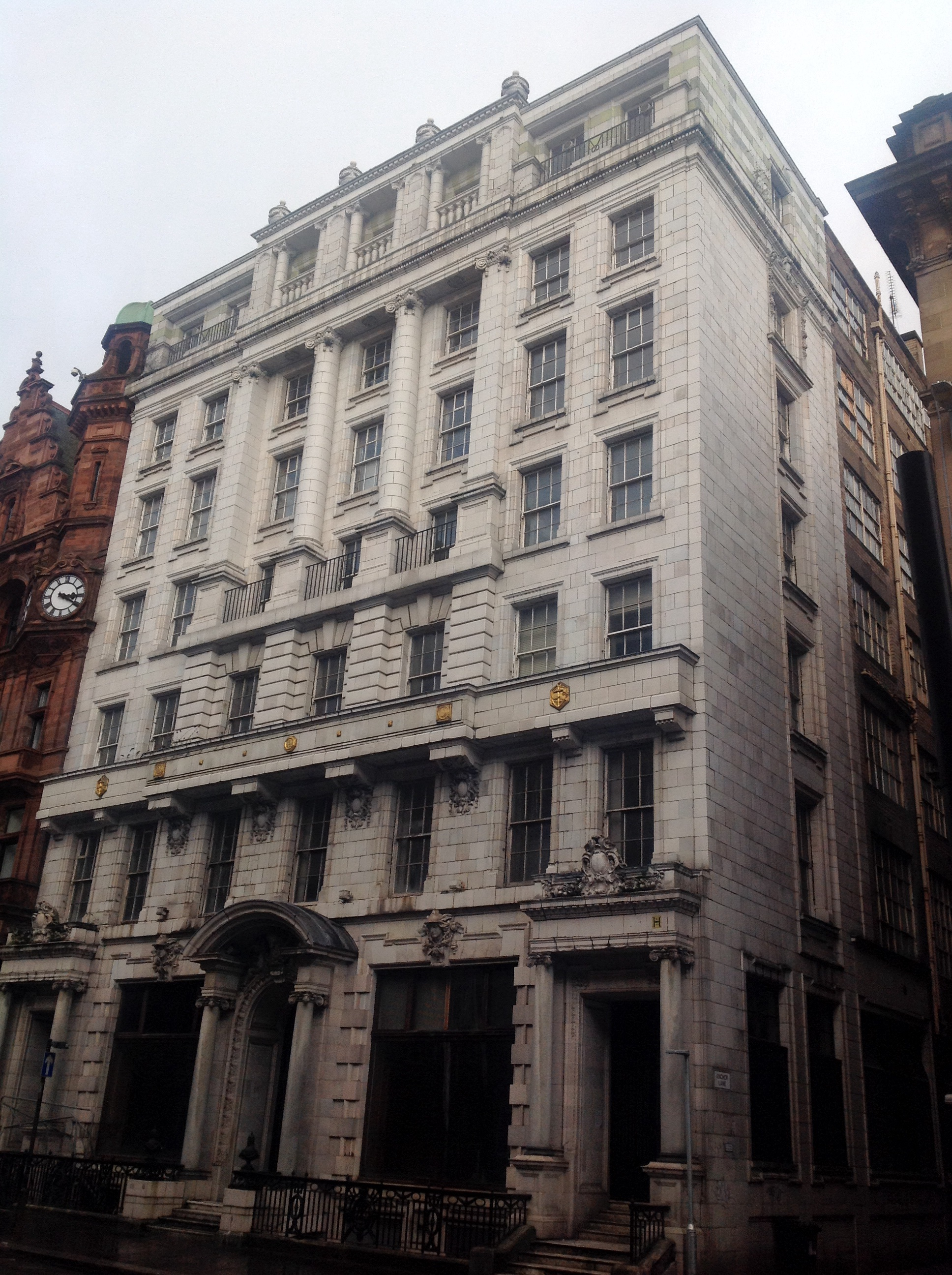
Anchor's headquarters building in St Vincent Place, Glasgow, designed by James Miller and completed in 1907, now a restaurant bearing the Anchor Line name.

Shipping magnate Lord Runciman saved the company, letting it retain its identity.

In the Second World War the Admiralty requisitioned Cameronia and Transylvania as armed merchant cruisers. On 10 August 1940 German submarine U-56 (1938) torpedoed and sank Transylvania in the North Atlantic off Malin Head, killing 36 members of her complement.

After the war Anchor Line struggled once again to change with the times. Its core markets gradually disappeared with the expansion of air transport. The company restructured several times to try and stay abreast of events but the last Anchor line ships were finally withdrawn from service in 1980 and the company was no more. At its height however, Anchor Line was well renowned and vitally important to Glasgow. In a company history written in 1932 it was observed that:

"They give employment to hundreds of dockers, loading and discharging. Each ship carries between four and five hundred crew, nearly all belonging to or resident around Clydeside. The money circulated for stores and other trade accounts runs into hundreds of thousands of pounds in the year. The welfare of some thousands of people depends on the ships."

Patrick Dollan, Provost of Glasgow summed the feeling up in an article:

"Every Scot thrills with pride and memories of the adventure and enjoyment of travel on hearing of the Anchor Line. When I was a boy it was the ambition of every youngster to sail across the Atlantic on an Anchor Liner..."

== Bibliography ==
- The Book of the Anchor Line. London and Cheltenham: The Anchor Line. 1932.
- Bellamy, Martin; Spalding, Bill (2011). The Golden Years of the Anchor Line. Catrine: Stenlake Publishing for Glasgow Museums. ISBN 978-1840335293. Archived from the original on 11 September 2011.
- Dollan, Patrick (December 1938). "Letter from the Provost". All Aboard: The Magazine of the Transylvania and the Caledonia. XI (42).
