= RMS Cameronia =

British ocean liner

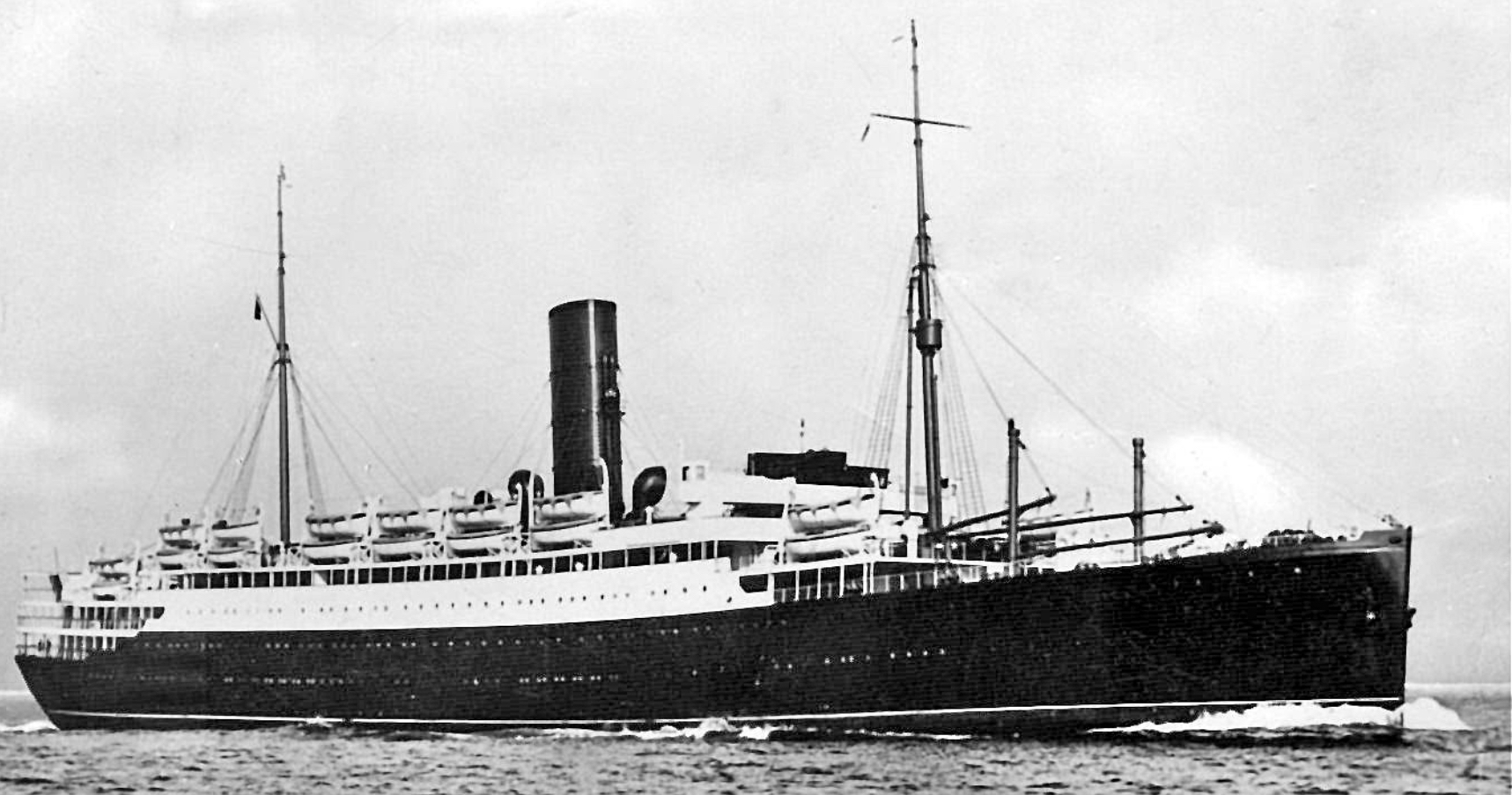
- SS Cameronia

History

United Kingdom
- Name: SS Cameronia (1920–41); HMT Cameronia (1941–45); SS Cameronia (1945–53); SS Empire Clyde (1953–57)
- Owner: Anchor Line (1920–35); Anchor Line (1935) Ltd (1935–41); Royal Navy (1941–45); Anchor Line (1935) Ltd (1945–53); Ministry of Troop Transport (1953–57)
- Operator: Henderson Bros Ltd (1920–35); Anchor Line (1935) Ltd (1935–57)
- Port of registry: (United Kingdom of Great Britain and Ireland) Glasgow (1920–22); (United Kingdom) Glasgow (1922–41); (United Kingdom) Royal Navy (1941–45); (United Kingdom) Glasgow (1945–57)
- Builder: William Beardmore & Co Ltd
- Yard number: 584
- Launched: 23 December 1919
- Completed: May 1921
- Maiden voyage: 11 May 1921
- Out of service: 1934–35, 1945–47
- Identification: UK official number 144242; Code letters KHSQ (1920–33); Call sign GDXS (1934–53)
- Fate: Scrapped 1957

General characteristics
- Type: Ocean liner (1920–35, 36–41); Troopship (1935–36, 1941–53)
- Tonnage: 16,297 GRT; 9,607 NRT
- Length: 552 ft 4 in (168.35 m)
- Beam: 70 ft 4 in (21.44 m)
- Depth: 38 ft 8 in (11.79 m)
- Installed power: 6 steam turbines
- Propulsion: 2 Screw propellers
- Speed: 16 knots (30 km/h)
- Capacity: 265 1st class, 370 2nd class and 1,100 3rd class passengers (1921–28); 290 cabin class, 431 tourist class and 698 3rd class passengers (1928–35); 1,266 passengers (1948–53)
- Notes: sister ship: Lancastria

Cameronia was a British ocean liner which was built in 1920 by William Beardmore & Co Ltd, Dalmuir for the Anchor Line. She was requisitioned for use as a troopship in the Second World War, surviving a torpedo attack. In 1953 she was requisitioned by the Ministry of Troop Transport (MoTT) and renamed Empire Clyde. She was scrapped in 1957.

== Description ==
The ship was built by William Beardmore & Co Ltd, Dalmuir, as yard number 584. She was launched on 23 December 1919, and completed in September 1920.

The ship was 552 feet 4 inches (168.35 m) long, with a beam of 70 feet 4 inches (21.44 m) and a depth of 38 feet 8 inches (11.79 m). She had a16,297 GRT and 9,607 NRT. She was propelled by six Beardmore-built steam turbines, double reduction geared, driving twin screw propellers. which could propel her at 16 knots (30 km/h).

== History ==
=== Pre war ===
Cameronia was built for the Anchor Line, which was owned by Cunard Line. She was a sister ship to RMS Lancastria. Although she was launched in December 1919, a strike delayed her final completion. In April 1921, Cameronia was towed to Cherbourg, France for final fitting out. She had accommodation for 265 1st class, 370 2nd class and 1,100 3rd class passengers. Cameronia departed Glasgow on 11 May 1921 on her maiden voyage to Liverpool and New York. Cameronia was placed under the management of the Henderson Brothers Ltd. Her port of registry was Glasgow. Her UK official number was 144242 and until 1933 her code letters were KHSQ.

In October 1925, Cameronia rescued the crew of a United States Coast Guard cutter that had caught fire. She was in collision with the Norwegian steamship Hauk the following month. In the case for damages raised in the Court of Session, Lord Constable ruled that both vessels had been at fault. The apportionment of damages was not decided until December 1927, with Cameronia being apportioned one-third of the liability. Her steering gear failed on a voyage in January 1926 and she returned to Glasgow for repairs. In August 1926, a collision with Cunard's Samaria was avoided by 6 feet (1.8 m).

Cameronia underwent a refit in 1928 to correct her tendency to pitch heavily. In 1929 another refit saw her accommodation refitted to cabin/tourist class. She now had accommodation for 290 cabin class, 431 tourist class and 698 3rd class passengers. On May 24, 1930, an explosion aboard City of Sydney in the Irish Sea killed one man and injured three, and Cameronia answered her SOS and transferred the casualties to Belfast. In 1934, Cameronia's code letters were superseded by the call sign GDXS. She was laid up on the Clyde in December 1934. In 1935, the Anchor Line went into liquidation, and Cameronia was one of the assets purchased by Anchor Line (1935) Ltd. She remained laid up until the autumn of 1935, when she entered service as a troopship. In spring 1936, she was again refitted and returned to use as an ocean liner. Cameronia participated in the 1937 Spithead Naval Review, where she was used as a floating grandstand.

=== Second World War ===
War was declared in September 1939. Cameronia departed Glasgow on 5 September. During the voyage to New York, she rescued some of the survivors from Athenia, and was the first British ship to enter New York after war had been declared. Cameronia returned to the United Kingdom as part of Convoy HXF 1, which departed Halifax, Nova Scotia on 19 September 1939 and arrived at Liverpool on 29 September. Cameronia was bound for Glasgow. She made eleven unescorted round trips from Glasgow – New York in the period to December 1940, when she was requisitioned for use as a troopship. On 29 January 1941, Cameronia joined Convoy WS 5B at Freetown, Sierra Leone, sailing with the convoy to the Suez Canal, where she arrived on 3 March. Cameronia was a member of Convoy GA 10, which arrived at Alexandria, Egypt on 6 April 1941. On 23 March 1942, Cameronia departed the United Kingdom as a member of Convoy WS17, bound for Freetown. She departed Freetown on 11 April as part of Convoy WS17B bound for Cape Town, South Africa, arriving on 23 April. On 27 April, Cameronia departed Cape Town as part of Convoy WS 17 bound for Mombasa, Kenya, where she arrived on 8 May. On 10 May Cameronia departed Mombasa as part of Convoy WS 17BZ, arriving at Bombay, India on 19 May. On 29–30 May 1941, she and the Glen Line's Glengyle evacuated 6,000 Argyll and Sutherland Highlanders from Sphakia at the end of the Battle of Crete.

Cameronia served in the Mediterranean as a Landing Ship, Infantry during the war, taking part in the Allied invasion of French North Africa in November 1942. On 22 December 1942, Cameronia was hit by a torpedo dropped by a Junkers Ju 88 of III Gruppe, KG 26 off Algiers, Algeria. A 288 square feet (26.8 m^{2}) hole was blown in Cameronia's side and 17 people were killed. U-565 also claimed to have damaged her. Cameronia managed to reach the port of Bougie, Algeria, from where she was escorted at 5 knots (9.3 km/h) to Algiers. She then sailed to Gibraltar where temporary repairs were carried out. Cameronia then sailed to Glasgow for permanent repairs. Repairs were completed in June 1943 and Cameronia was then returned to service. On 29 August 1943, Cameronia departed Gibraltar as part of Convoy MKF 22, which had departed from Port Said, Egypt on 19 August and arrived at the Clyde on 9 September. On 6 December 1943, Cameronia departed Oran, Algeria with members of the 21st General Hospital. They were landed at Naples, Italy on 21 December. Cameronia was the largest troopship that took part in Operation Overlord in June 1944. She served until the end of the war, when she was laid up.

=== Post war ===
In 1947, Cameronia was returned to service on trooping duties to Palestine. In 1948, she was refitted by Barclay, Curle & Co Ltd, Elderslie, giving her accommodation for 1,266 passengers in a single class. She was used to transport people emigrating to Australia. In 1953, Cameronia was sold to the Ministry of Transport and was renamed Empire Clyde, remaining under the management of Anchor Line. She served until 1957, arriving on 22 October at Newport, Monmouthshire for scrapping.

== In popular culture ==
The Cameronia is mentioned in the fourth season of the British television drama Downton Abbey, when a central character, Robert, Earl of Grantham, books passage on the ship on a last-minute trip to New York to aid his brother-in-law, Harold Levinson (played by Paul Giamatti) when the millionaire playboy gets caught up in the Teapot Dome scandal.
