= SS Utopia =

British transatlantic passenger steamship (1874–1900)

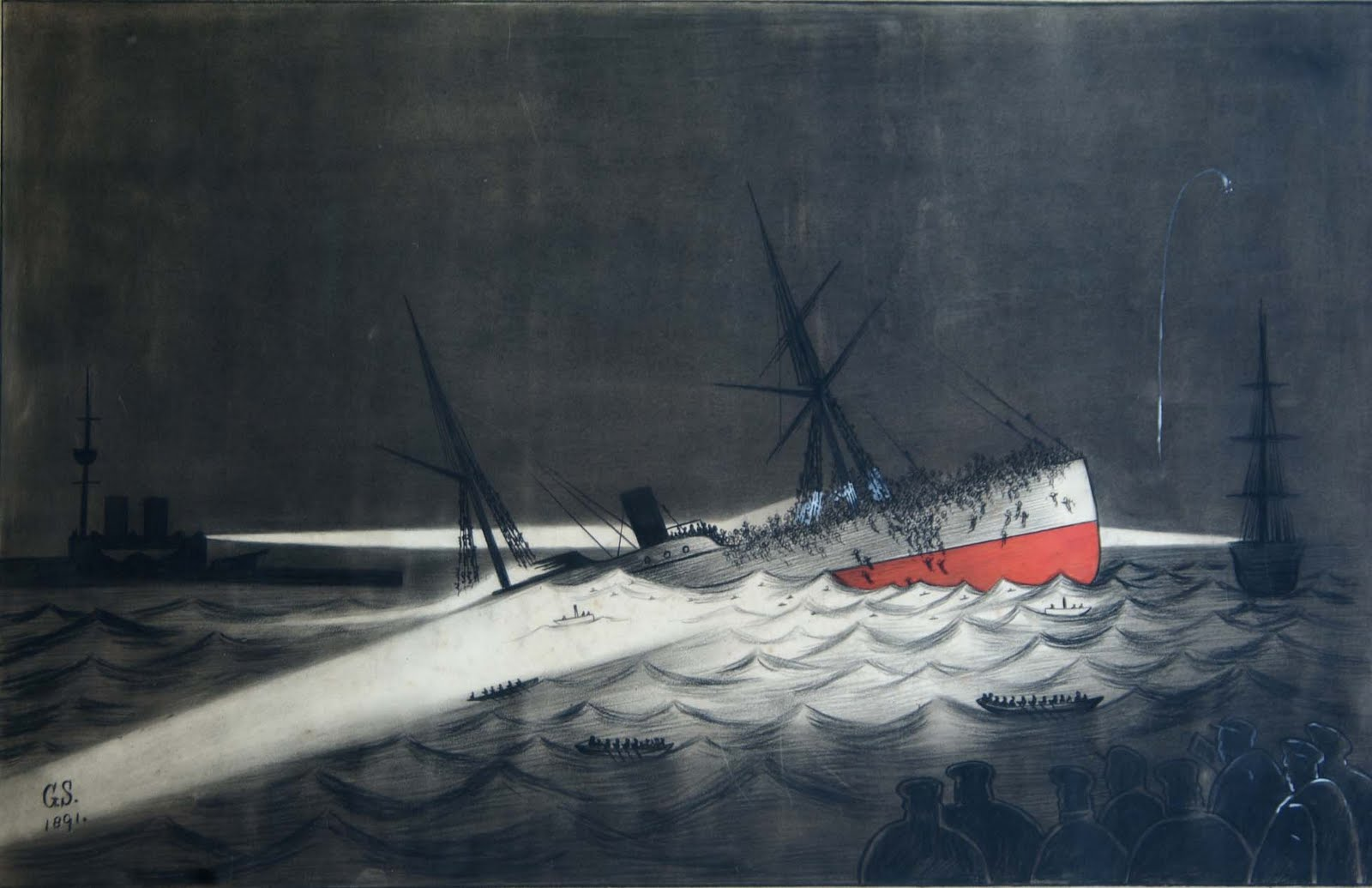
- Sketch of the sinking of Utopia by a witness, Ms. Georgina Smith

History
- Name: SS Utopia
- Operator: Anchor Line
- Route: Transatlantic
- Builder: Robert Duncan & Co., Glasgow
- Launched: 14 February 1874
- Maiden voyage: 23 May 1874
- Refit: 1890–91
- Fate: Sank in Gibraltar on 17 March 1891. Scrapped in 1900.

General characteristics
- Tonnage: 2,371 GRT
- Length: 350 ft (110 m)
- Beam: 35 ft (11 m)
- Propulsion: Triple expansion steam engine
- Speed: 13 knots (24 km/h)

SS Utopia was a transatlantic passenger steamship built in 1874 by Robert Duncan & Co of Glasgow. From 1874 to 1882 she operated on Anchor Line routes from Glasgow to New York City, from Glasgow to Bombay and from London to New York City. After 1882 she carried Italian immigrants to the United States.

On 17 March 1891 Utopia accidentally collided with the moored battleship HMS Anson in the Bay of Gibraltar. Utopia sank within 20 minutes; 562 of 880 passengers and crew of Utopia and two rescuers from HMS Immortalité died in the accident. The sinking of Utopia was blamed on "grave error of judgement" of her captain John McKeague, who survived the accident.

== Anchor Liner ==
Utopia was built by Robert Duncan of Glasgow as a transatlantic steamer for the Anchor Line. Utopia was a sister ship to Elysia (1873) and Alsatia (1876), designed to carry 120 first class, 60 second class and 600 steerage (third class) passengers. She was launched on 14 February 1874 and sailed out on her maiden voyage to New York City on 23 May 1874. After 12 round trips on the route from Glasgow to New York City she sailed on the route from Glasgow to Bombay. In April 1876, Anchor Line transferred Utopia, Elysia, Anglia and Australia to serve the route from London to New York City. On 6 September 1878, she ran down and sank the German full-rigged ship Helios. Utopia rescued her crew. Utopia made 40 round-trip voyages on this route.

In 1882 she was transferred to the Mediterranean, and regularly carried Italian immigrants to the United States. In 1890–91 she was refitted with a triple expansion steam engine. To maximize revenue on the Italian route her first class accommodation was reduced to 45 passengers, second class was removed altogether, and steerage capacity was increased to 900 bunks.

== Sinking ==
On 25 February 1891 Utopia sailed out from the port of Trieste for New York City, with stopovers at Naples, Genoa and Gibraltar. She carried a total of 880 people: 59 crew (most of them stewards), 3 first class passengers, 815 third class passengers, and 3 stowaways. There were 85 women and 67 children. According to Captain John McKeague's signed statement, Utopia normally carried seven lifeboats that could accommodate up to "460 people in moderate weather" but on the night of the catastrophe one of these boats was missing, and there was a strong current.

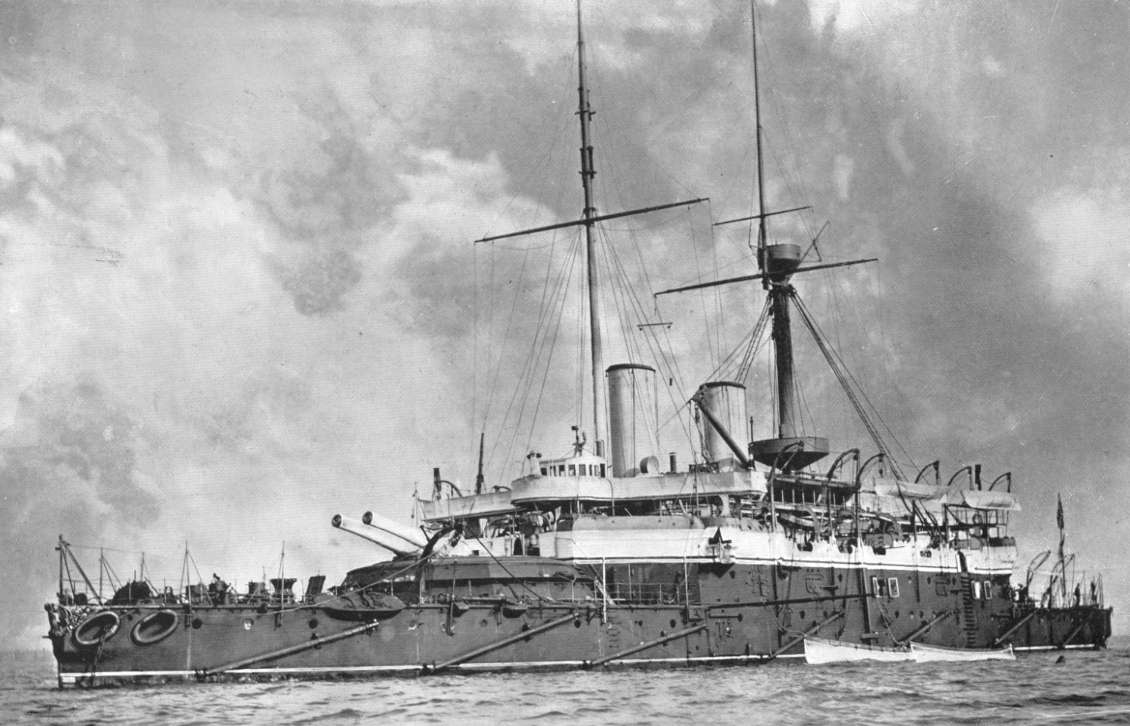
HMS Anson in 1897

Utopia reached Gibraltar in the afternoon of 17 March. Captain McKeague navigated Utopia to her usual anchorage in the inner harbour, but then realized that it was occupied by two battleships, HMS Anson and HMS Rodney. McKeague later said that he had been temporarily dazzled by Anson's searchlight. When McKeague's eyesight recovered he "suddenly discovered that the inside anchorage was full of ships". McKeague, according to his statement, thought that Anson was "further off than she really was" and attempted to steer Utopia ahead of Anson's bow. Suddenly, a "strong gale combined with current swept the vessel across the bows of the Anson, and in a moment her hull was pierced and cut by the ram of the ironclad". According to third mate Francis Wadsworth, the impact occurred at 6:36 p.m. Anson's ram tore a hole 5 metres (16 ft) wide below Utopia's waterline, and her holds quickly flooded.

McKeague at first considered beaching the ship, but Utopia almost instantly lost engine power; the engineers had shut down the engines to prevent a steam explosion. McKeague ordered the lowering of the lifeboats and to abandon ship, but Utopia suddenly listed 70 degrees, crushing and sinking the boats. The survivors clung to the starboard of Utopia while hundreds were trapped inside steerage holds. 20 minutes after the impact Utopia sank to a depth of 17 metres (56 ft). Her masts, protruding above the waves, became the last refuge for survivors.

Anson, the Swedish Navy corvette Freja, and other nearby ships immediately sent rescue crews to the site, but rough weather and a strong current made it difficult for them to approach the wreck. "Rescuers, blinded by the wind and rain, saw nothing but a confused, struggling mass of human beings entangled with wreckage." Two sailors from HMS Immortalité, James Croton and George Hales, drowned attempting to rescue survivors when their boat drifted on the rocks. Search and rescue continued until 11 p.m. Out of 880 passengers and crew of Utopia, there were 318 survivors: 290 steerage passengers, 2 first class passengers, 3 Italian interpreters, and 23 crew. The remaining 562 passengers and crew of Utopia were dead or missing.

== Aftermath ==
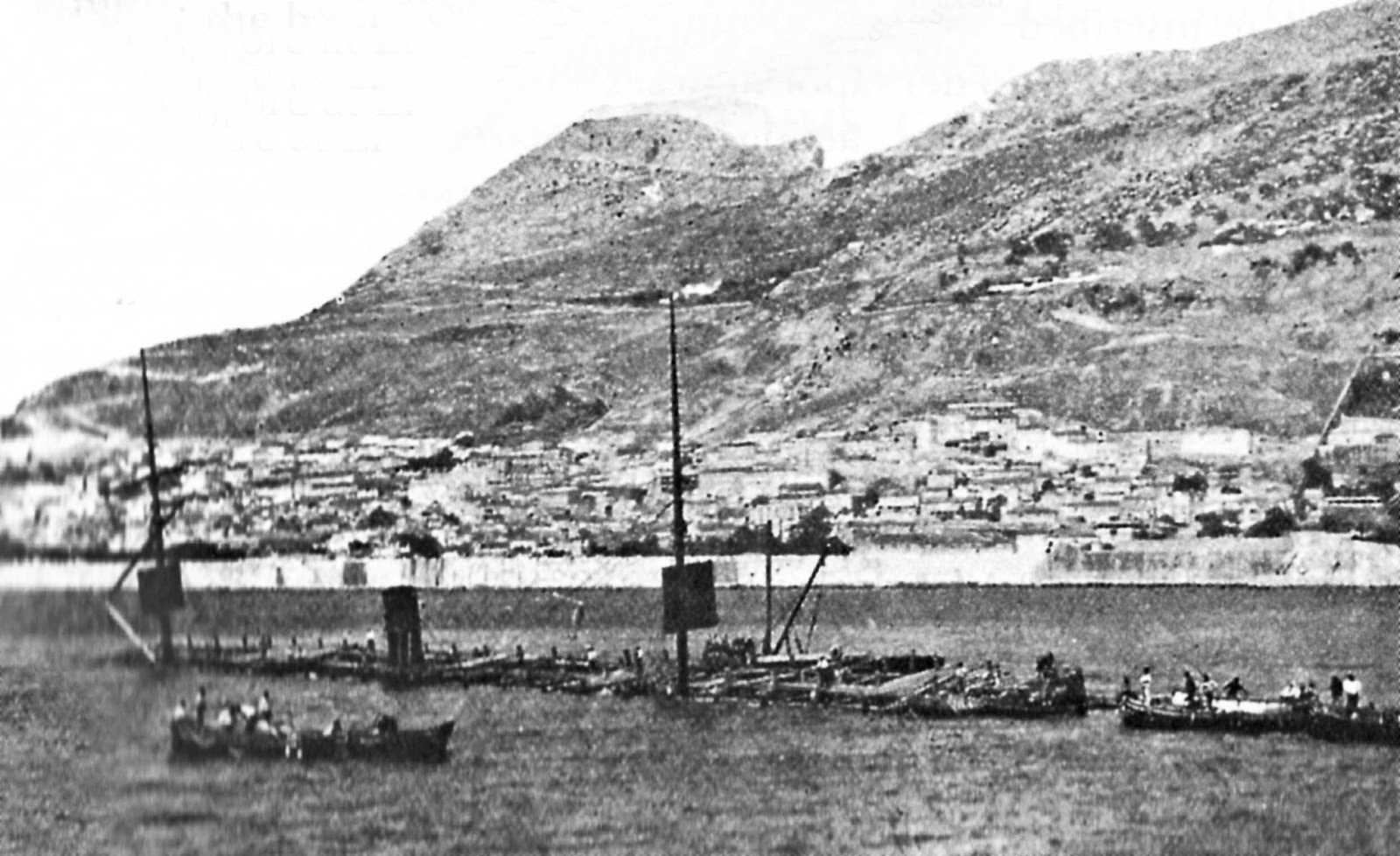
Wreck of Utopia in Gibraltar Harbour

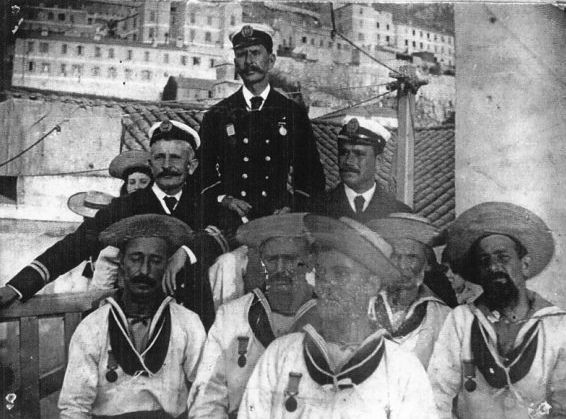
Members of the Gibraltar Port Authority – most of them unidentified Gibraltarian men – wearing medals awarded for their bravery during the disaster. Tentative identification can be found at .

Croton and Hales were buried with military honours on 19 March. The first group of Utopia victims, 28 adults and 3 children, were buried in a trench in Gibraltar on 20 March. Divers sent to examine the wreck reported that the inner spaces of Utopia "were closely packed with the bodies ... who had become wedged into an almost solid mass"; and that "the bodies of many of the drowned were found so firmly clasped together that it was difficult to separate them." Hundreds of bodies remained trapped in the steerage holds of the sunken ship.

Captain McKeague was arrested and released on the same day for a bail of £480. The British court of inquiry chaired by Charles Cavendish Boyle, Captain of the Port of Gibraltar, convened on 23 March 1891 "under the provisions of the Merchant Shipping Ordinance, Gibraltar, 1886". McKeague was found guilty of grave errors in judgement: "firstly, in attempting to enter the anchorage ... without having first opened out and ascertained what vessels were there" and "secondly, in attempting to turn his ship out across the bows of HMS Anson."

After the accident the port authority of Gibraltar obliged Anchor Line to light up the remains of Utopia. For a few days the wreck was illuminated by lights hoisted on each masthead. The precaution, however, did not prevent another incident: SS Primula, entering the harbour, collided with the wreck of Utopia. At the inquiry the crew of Primula said that they did see the lights, but not the ship. They recognized the masts and funnel protruding above the water when the collision was already inevitable. The court ruling on the second Utopia collision set a precedent of maritime law that remained in place for 35 years. Judge Sir Frances Jeune, contrary to established practice, absolved the owners of Utopia from liability because they had legitimately transferred "control and management of the wreck" to the Port of Gibraltar. He additionally suggested, that such a transfer insulated the owners from any requirement to prevent further collisions with the wreck, but that general principle was later expressly overruled in Dee Conservancy Board vs. McConnell.

The wreck of Utopia was raised in July 1892 and brought back to Scotland. Her owners gave up plans of reviving the ship and left her to rust in the River Clyde. The hulk was scrapped in 1900.

== See also ==
- The sinking of HMS Victoria
