= SS G. P. Griffith =

Passenger steamer that burned and sank on Lake Erie

G. P. Griffith
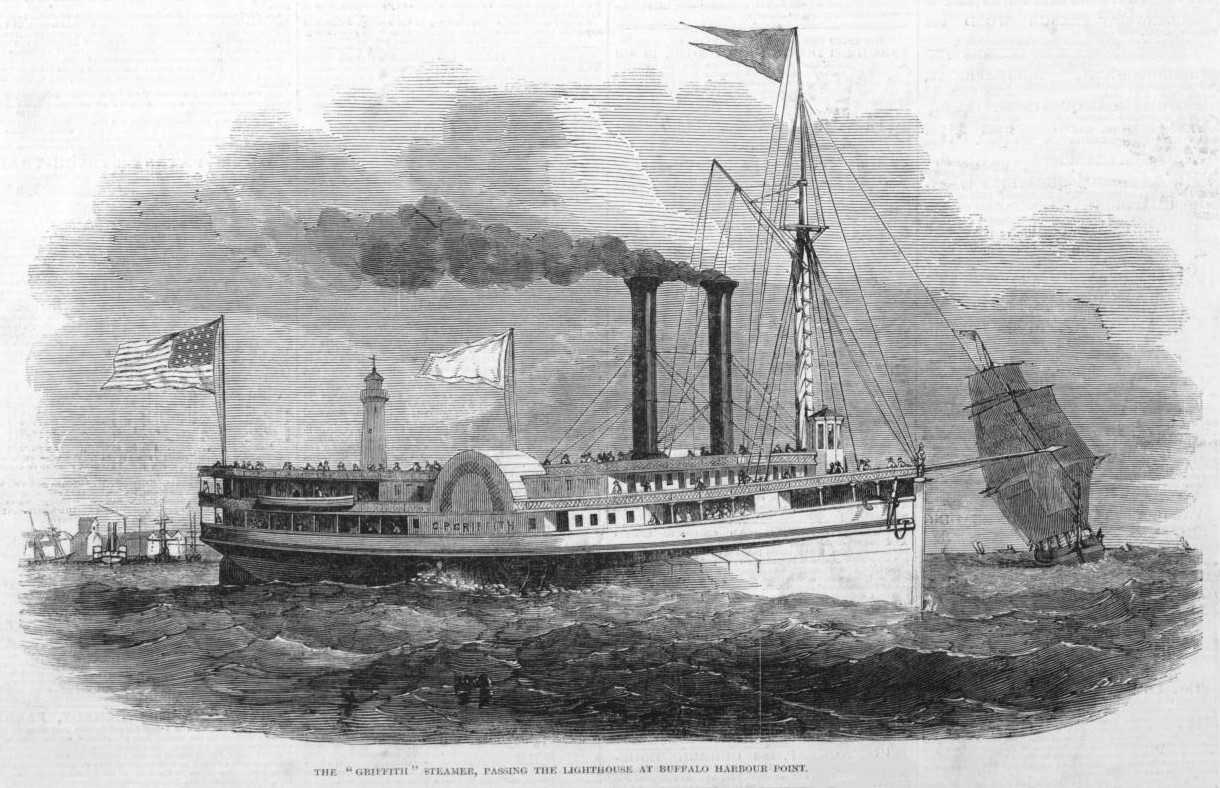
- The Griffith Steamer, passing the lighthouse at Buffalo Harbour Point, The Illustrated London News

History
- Name: G. P. Griffith
- Laid down: 1847
- Completed: 1848
- Out of service: 17 June 1850
- Fate: Beached and burned to the waterline, 17 June 1850

General characteristics
- Type: Wooden steamship
- Tonnage: 587
- Length: 193 ft (59 m)
- Draft: 6 ft (1.8 m) with no cargo; 7 ft (2.1 m) with full cargo
- Propulsion: Paddle wheels

SS G. P. Griffith was a passenger steamer that burned and sank on Lake Erie on 17 June 1850, resulting in the loss of between 241 and 289 lives. The destruction of the G. P. Griffith was the greatest loss of life on the Great Lakes up to that point, and remains the third-greatest today, after the Eastland in 1915 and the Lady Elgin in 1860.

== Characteristics ==
The G. P. Griffith was launched in 1848 at Maumee, Ohio. It was named for businessman Griffith P. Griffith. The ship was 193 feet (59 m) long, and weighed 587 tons. It had a very shallow draft of around six feet when empty, or seven when fully loaded. The upper cabin was 165 feet (50 m) long and 13 feet (4.0 m) wide, containing 56 staterooms.

== Career ==
On 17 October 1849 the G. P. Griffith collided with the Canadian schooner California near Cleveland. The California was badly damaged and drifted ashore, while the G. P. Griffith suffered no serious damage.

== The fire ==
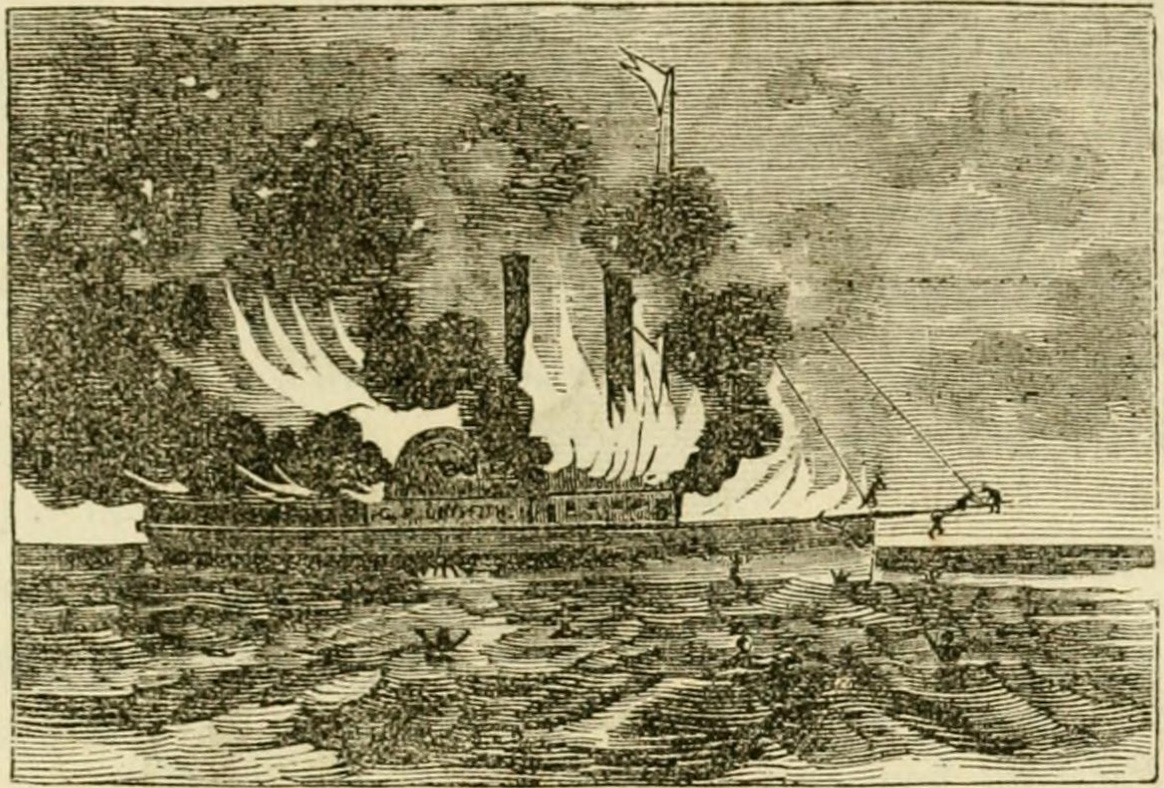
An illustration of the G. P. Griffith on fire

On 16 June 1850, the G. P. Griffith departed Buffalo, New York, heading for Toledo, Ohio with stops along the way. The Griffith was carrying 326 passengers, many of whom were recent immigrants from England, Ireland, Germany, and Scandinavia. The G. P. Griffith stopped at Erie, Pennsylvania, and Fairport, Ohio, then departed Fairport for Cleveland. Around 4 am on 17 June, the Griffith was about two miles out of Fairport when the ship's wheelsman, Richard Mann, reported sparks shooting up around the ship's smokestacks. C. C. Roby, the ship's captain, ordered the ship's course altered towards the shore. The Griffith's speed fanned the flames, consuming the aft of the ship and forcing the passengers forward. The crew abandoned their posts, causing the Griffith's engines to run out of steam and the paddle wheels to slow and stop. However, the ship's momentum carried it forward until it hit a sandbar in water eight feet deep less than half a mile from the beach. Flames quickly consumed the ship, burning to death anyone left aboard. Many passengers jumped into the water, where most drowned or were pulled under by other panicked passengers who could not swim. The ship's mate swam ashore and found a small boat, which he used to go back and rescue others. Captain Roby threw his wife into the lake in an attempt to save her, then did the same for his mother, his child, and the wife of the ship's barber before jumping in himself. The Captain and his family perished, but the barber's wife survived, the only woman to do so.

== Aftermath ==
The steamer Delaware eventually towed the still-burning Griffith to shore. (This was not the Delaware's first encounter with tragedy on the lakes; when the steamer Phoenix burned on Lake Michigan in 1847, the Delaware had rescued survivors and towed the burning wreck to shore.) The ship's records were destroyed in the fire, so the number of people who perished cannot be exactly determined. Only 37 survivors were ever accounted for. At least 241 people died in the disaster, but the number may be as high as 289. One estimate is that there were 326 persons on board of whom about 30 survived and that 154 remains were recovered-all but four on the beach; a listing of those killed numbered 48 of whom 25 were identified by name. A committee of local citizens was formed to deal with the large number of bodies that washed ashore. A mass grave was dug nearby, and 47 men, 24 women, and 25 children were buried in it. Any bodies that could be identified were taken to Cleveland on the steamer Diamond. Four days after the wreck, the county wreckmaster released a list of the belongings recovered from the victims. The list consisted of common items of little value, despite the fact that many of the passengers were immigrants who brought all of their wealth with them. The next day, visitors to the wreck site saw that the mass grave had been disturbed and bodies in it exposed. Ten days after the wreck, more bodies began to wash ashore, all men whose bodies had been weighed down by gold-filled money belts until the bloating of their corpses brought them to the surface. In the summer of 2000, 150 years after the disaster, a monument to those who died in the disaster was erected in Willowick, near the site of the wreck.
