= USS Lynx (1814) =

American naval vessel

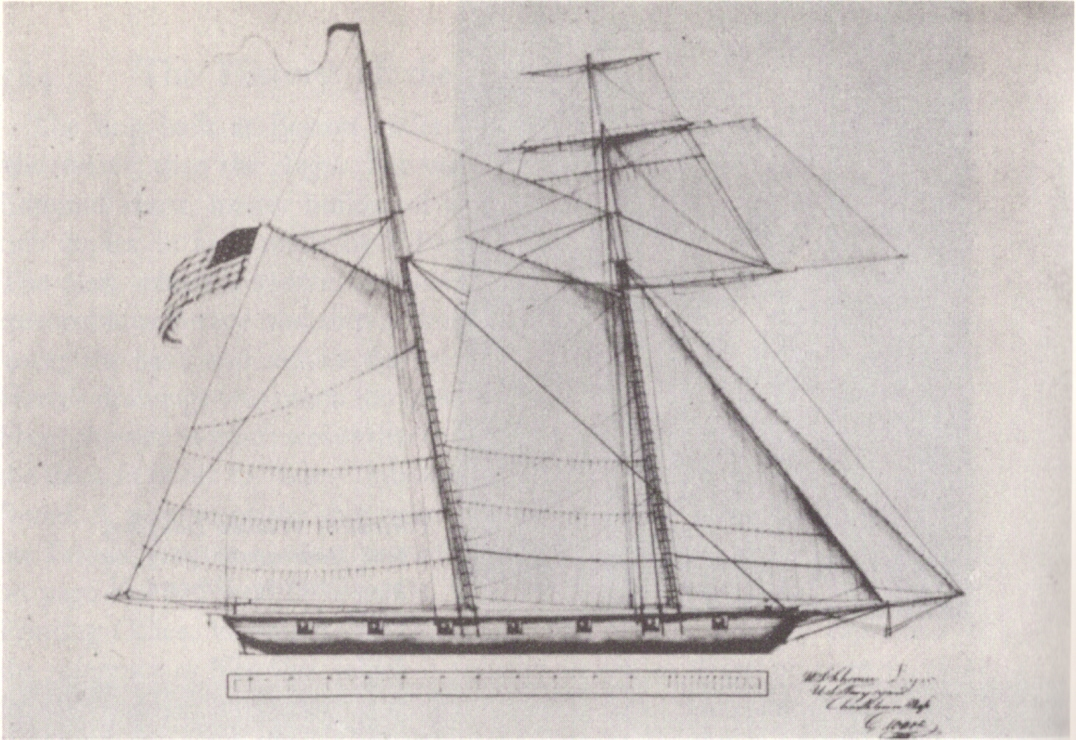
- Sail plan of USS Lynx

History

United States
- Name: USS Lynx
- Builder: James Owner, Georgetown, Washington, D.C.
- Launched: 1814
- Commissioned: 1815
- Stricken: 1820
- Fate: Lost at sea, January 1820

General characteristics
- Type: Baltimore Clipper
- Displacement: 150 long tons (152 t)
- Length: 80 ft (24 m)
- Propulsion: Sail
- Complement: 50
- Armament: 6 × guns

USS Lynx, a 6-gun Baltimore Clipper rigged schooner, was built for the United States Navy by James Owner of Georgetown, Washington, D.C., in 1814, intended for service in one of the two raiding squadrons being built as part of President James Madison's administration's plan to establish a more effective Navy, one capable not only of breaking the British naval blockade, but also of raising havoc with the British merchant marine.

== Service history ==
Though the War of 1812 ended by the time the schooner was completed, the ship was still placed in service in early 1815 and on 3 July sailed from Boston with the nine-ship squadron of Commodore William Bainbridge, bound for the Mediterranean to deal with the acts of the Barbary pirates against American commerce.

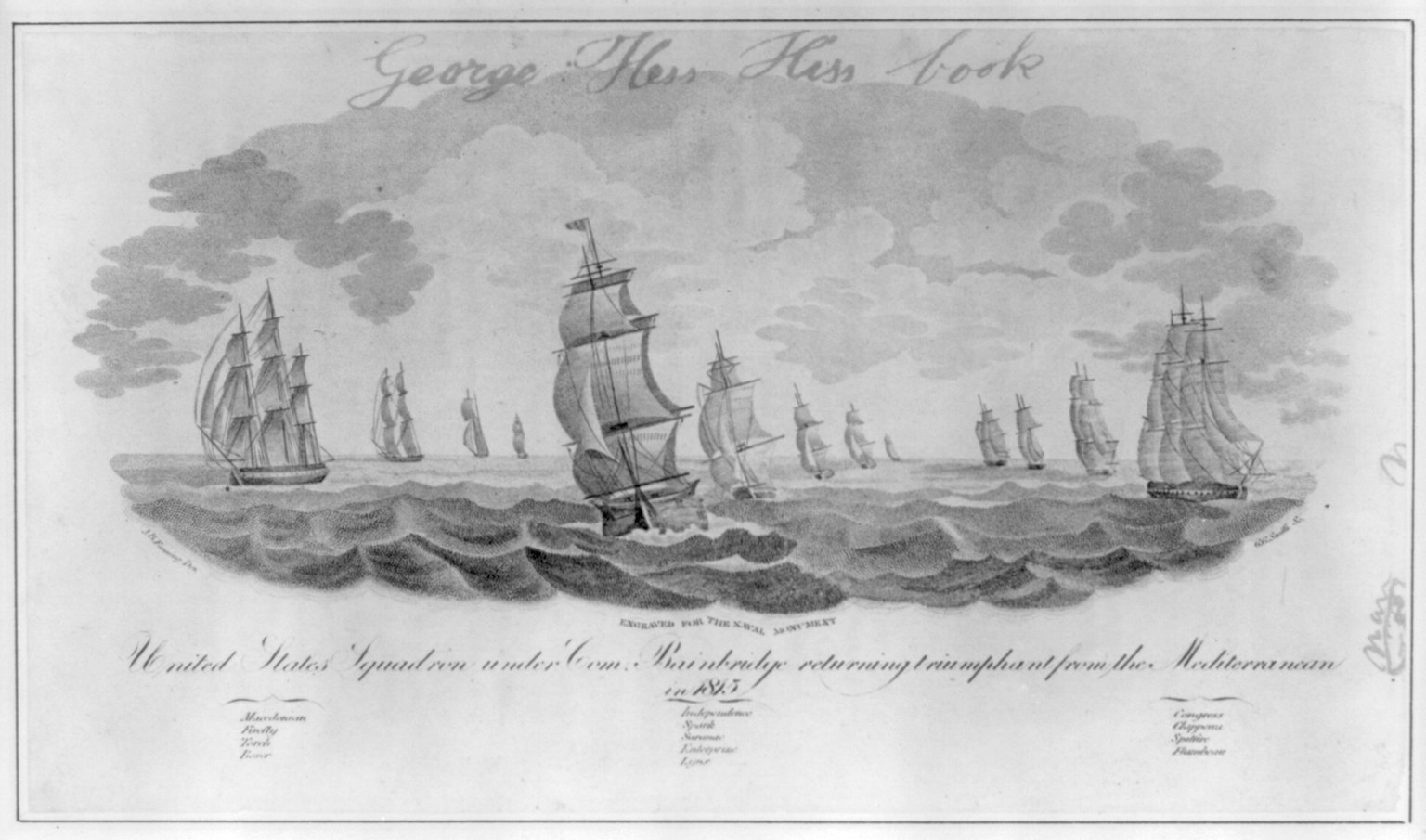
Lynx as a part of the United States Mediterranean squadron of 1815 (Second Barbary War)

Arriving off the North African coast by the beginning of August, Lynx found that a squadron under Commodore Stephen Decatur had already achieved satisfactory agreements to American treaty demands. The schooner remained in the Mediterranean, however, until late in the year as part of a show of force led by Commodore Bainbridge's flagship Independence, the Navy's first ship of the line, to encourage the Barbary States to keep the peace treaties just concluded. Returning to the United States, the ship made a preliminary survey of the northeastern coast during 1817, Lt. George W. Stover in command, at times carrying Commodore William Bainbridge, now Commandant of the Charlestown, Massachusetts, Navy Yard, and Brigadier General Joseph Gardner Swift aboard during her voyage.

Following this duty, Lynx sailed for the Gulf of Mexico to operate along the southern U.S. coast and in the West Indies suppressing piracy, continuing on this service for the next two years. On 24 October 1819, while under command of Lt. John Ripley Madison, she captured two schooners and two boats in the Gulf of Mexico, filled with pirates and booty, and 11 days later, on 9 November found another pirate boat in Galveston Bay and took her. Remaining off the southern coast through the end of the year, the Lynx departed St. Mary's, Georgia, on 11 January 1820, bound for Kingston, Jamaica, to continue her service suppressing pirates. She was never seen nor heard from again, and despite the searching of schooner Nonsuch, no trace of her or her 47-man crew was ever found.
