= HMS Anson (1886) =

Admiral-class battleship

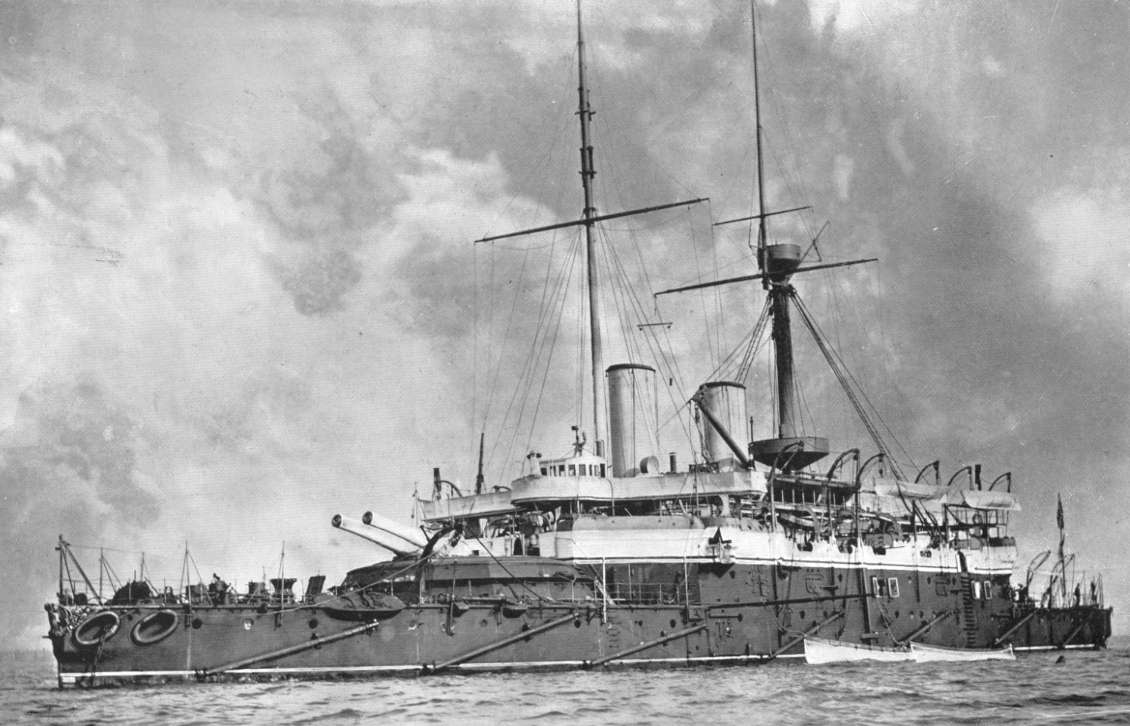
- Bow view of Anson at anchor, circa 1897

History

United Kingdom
- Name: Anson
- Namesake: Admiral George Anson
- Ordered: 1883
- Builder: Pembroke Dockyard
- Cost: £662,582
- Laid down: 24 April 1883
- Launched: 17 February 1886
- Completed: 28 May 1889
- Fate: Sold for scrap, 13 July 1909

General characteristics
- Class & type: Admiral-class battleship
- Displacement: 10,600 long tons (10,800 t)
- Length: 330 ft (100.6 m) (p.p.)
- Beam: 68 ft 6 in (20.9 m)
- Draught: 27 ft 10 in (8.5 m)
- Installed power: 7,500 ihp (5,600 kW) (normal); 11,500 ihp (8,600 kW) (forced draught)
- Propulsion: 2 × Humphreys compound-expansion steam engines; 2 × screws
- Speed: 16.9 kn (31.3 km/h; 19.4 mph) (forced draught)
- Range: 7,200 nmi (13,300 km; 8,300 mi) at 10 knots (19 km/h; 12 mph)
- Complement: 525–536
- Armament: 2 × twin BL 13.5 in (343 mm) Mk II guns; 6 × single BL 6 in (152 mm) Mk IV guns; 12 × single QF 6-pdr (2.2 in (57 mm)) Hotchkiss guns; 10 × single QF 3-pdr (1.9 in (47 mm)) Hotchkiss guns; 5 × 14 in (356 mm) torpedo tubes
- Armour: Waterline belt: 18–8 in (457–203 mm); Bulkheads: 16–7 in (406–178 mm); Barbettes: 14–12 in (356–305 mm); Conning tower: 12–2 in (305–51 mm); Deck: 3–2.5 in (76–64 mm)

HMS Anson was the last of six Admiral-class battleships built for the Royal Navy during the 1880s. The ship was completed, except for her armament, in 1887, but had to wait two years for her guns to be installed. She was assigned to the Channel Fleet in mid-1889 as a flagship for the fleet's second-in-command. Two years later, the passenger ship SS Utopia sank with the loss of 562 lives after colliding with Anson in the Bay of Gibraltar. In mid-1893, Anson was transferred to the Mediterranean Fleet, subsequently returning home in 1900 when she was assigned to the Reserve Fleet. She recommissioned for the Home Fleet in early 1901. Anson was paid off three years later and then sold for scrap in 1909.

== Design and description ==
The Admiral class was built in response to French ironclad battleships of the Hoche and Marceau classes. Anson and her sister ship, Camperdown, were enlarged and improved versions of the previous pair of Admirals, Rodney and Howe. The sisters had a length between perpendiculars of 330 feet (100.6 m), a beam of 68 feet 6 inches (20.9 m), and a draught of 27 feet 10 inches (8.5 m) at deep load. They displaced 10,600 long tons (10,800 t) at normal load, some 300 long tons (305 t) heavier than Howe and Rodney and 1,100 long tons (1,118 t) heavier than the first ship of the class, Collingwood. The ships had a complement of 525–536 officers and ratings.

=== Propulsion ===
Anson was powered by two 3-cylinder inverted compound-expansion steam engines, each driving one propeller. The Humphreys engines produced a total of 7,500 indicated horsepower (5,600 kW) at normal draught and 11,500 ihp (8,600 kW) with forced draught, using steam provided by a dozen cylindrical boilers. The sisters were designed to reach a speed of 16 knots (30 km/h; 18 mph) at normal draught and Anson reached 17.4 knots (32.2 km/h; 20.0 mph) on her sea trials using forced draught. The ships carried a maximum of 1,200 long tons (1,219 t) of coal that gave 7,200 nmi (13,300 km; 8,300 mi) at a speed of 10 knots (19 km/h; 12 mph).

=== Armament ===
Unlike Collingwood, the later four Admiral-class ships had a main armament of 30-calibre rifled breech-loading (BL) 13.5-inch (343 mm) Mk II guns, rather than the 12-inch (305 mm) guns in the earlier ship. The four guns were mounted in two twin-gun, pear-shaped barbettes, one forward and one aft of the superstructure. The barbettes were open, without hoods or gun shields, and the guns were fully exposed. The 1,250-pound (570 kg) shells fired by these guns were credited with the ability to penetrate 28 inches (711 mm) of wrought iron at 1,000 yards (910 m) using a charge of 630 pounds (290 kg) of smokeless brown cocoa (SBC). At maximum elevation, the guns had a range of around 11,950 yards (10,930 m) with SBC; later a charge of 187 pounds (85 kg) of cordite was substituted for the SBC which extended the range to about 12,620 yards (11,540 m). There were significant delays in the production of the heavy guns for this ship and her sisters, due to cracking in the innermost layer of the guns, that significantly delayed the delivery of these ships.

The secondary armament of the Admirals consisted of six 26-calibre BL 6-inch (152 mm) Mk IV guns on single mounts positioned on the upper deck amidships, three on each broadside. They fired 100-pound (45 kg) shells that were credited with the ability to penetrate 10.5 inches (267 mm) of wrought iron at 1000 yards. They had a range of 8,830 yards (8,070 m) at an elevation of +15° using prismatic black powder. Beginning around 1895 all of these guns were converted into quick-firing guns (QF) with a much faster rate of fire. Using cordite extended their range to 9,275 yards (8,481 m). For defence against torpedo boats the ships carried a dozen QF 6-pounder (2.2-inch (57 mm)) Hotchkiss guns and 10 QF 3-pounder (1.9-inch (47 mm)) Hotchkiss guns.

They also mounted five 14-inch (356 mm) above-water torpedo tubes, one in the bow and four on the broadside.

=== Armour ===
The armour scheme of Anson and Camperdown was virtually identical to that of Collingwood, although the thickness of the armour plate on the barbettes was increased as was the length of the waterline armour belt. To accommodate these changes without an increase in draught, these later two ships were lengthened by 5 feet (1.5 m), and had their beam increased by 6 inches over their earlier sisters. The compound armour belt extended across the middle of the ships between the rear of each barbette for a length of 150 feet (45.7 m). It had a total height of 7 feet 6 inches (2.3 m) deep of which 6 feet 6 inches (2.0 m) was below water and 1 foot (0.3 m) above at normal load; at deep load, their draught increased by another 6 inches. The upper 4 feet (1.2 m) of the belt armour was 18 inches (457 mm) thick and the plates tapered to 8 inches (203 mm) at the bottom edge. Lateral bulkheads at the ends of the belt connected it to the barbettes; they were 16 inches (406 mm) thick at main deck level and 7 inches (178 mm) below.

The barbettes ranged in thickness from 14 to 12 inches (356 to 305 mm) with the main ammunition hoists protected by armoured tubes with walls 12 inches thick. The conning towers also had walls of that thickness as well as roofs 2 inches (51 mm) thick. The deck of the central armoured citadel had a thickness of 3 inches (76 mm) and the lower deck was 2.5 inches (64 mm) thick from the ends of the belt to the bow and stern.

== Construction and career ==
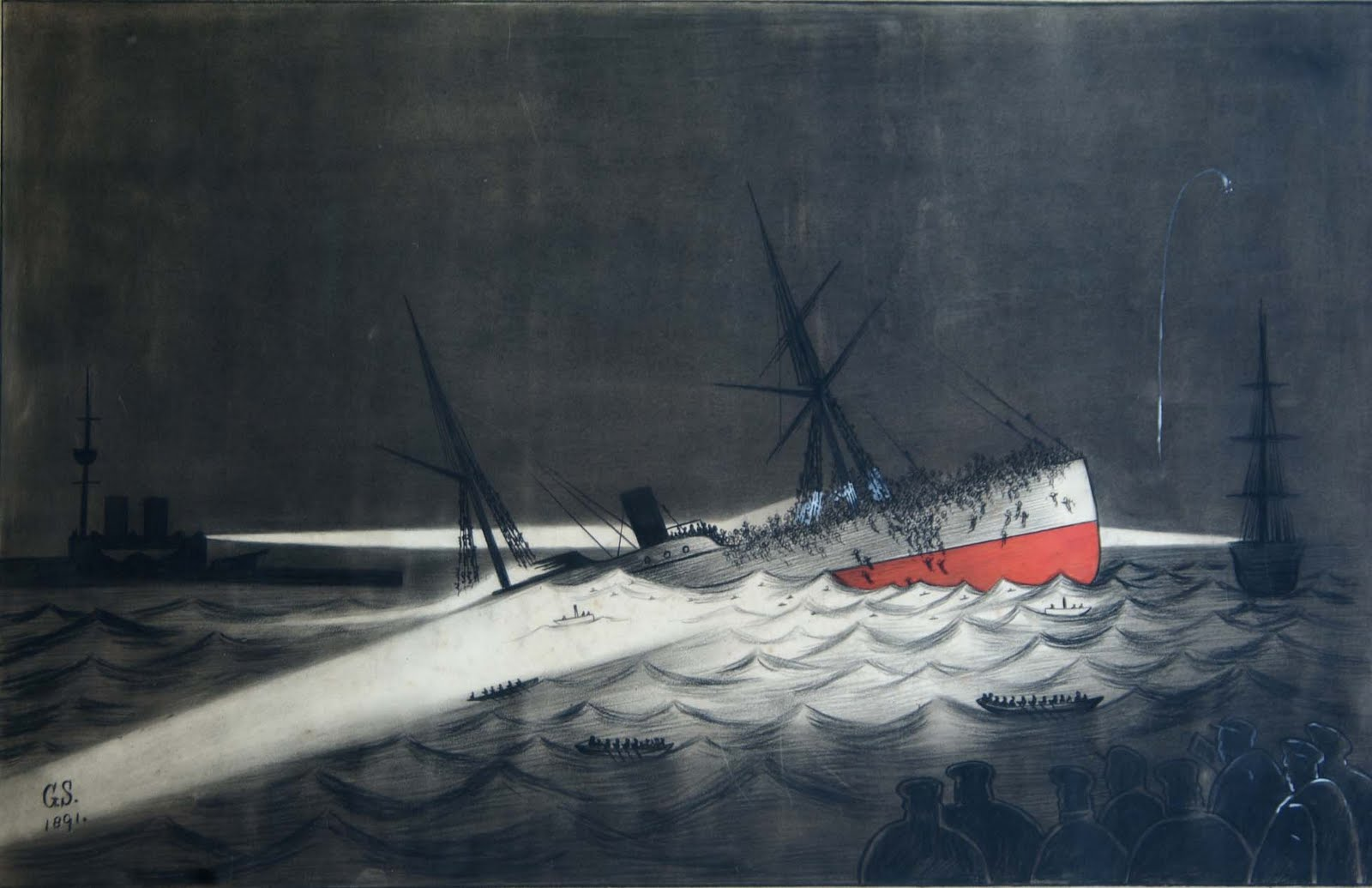
The sinking of SS Utopia by a witness 1891

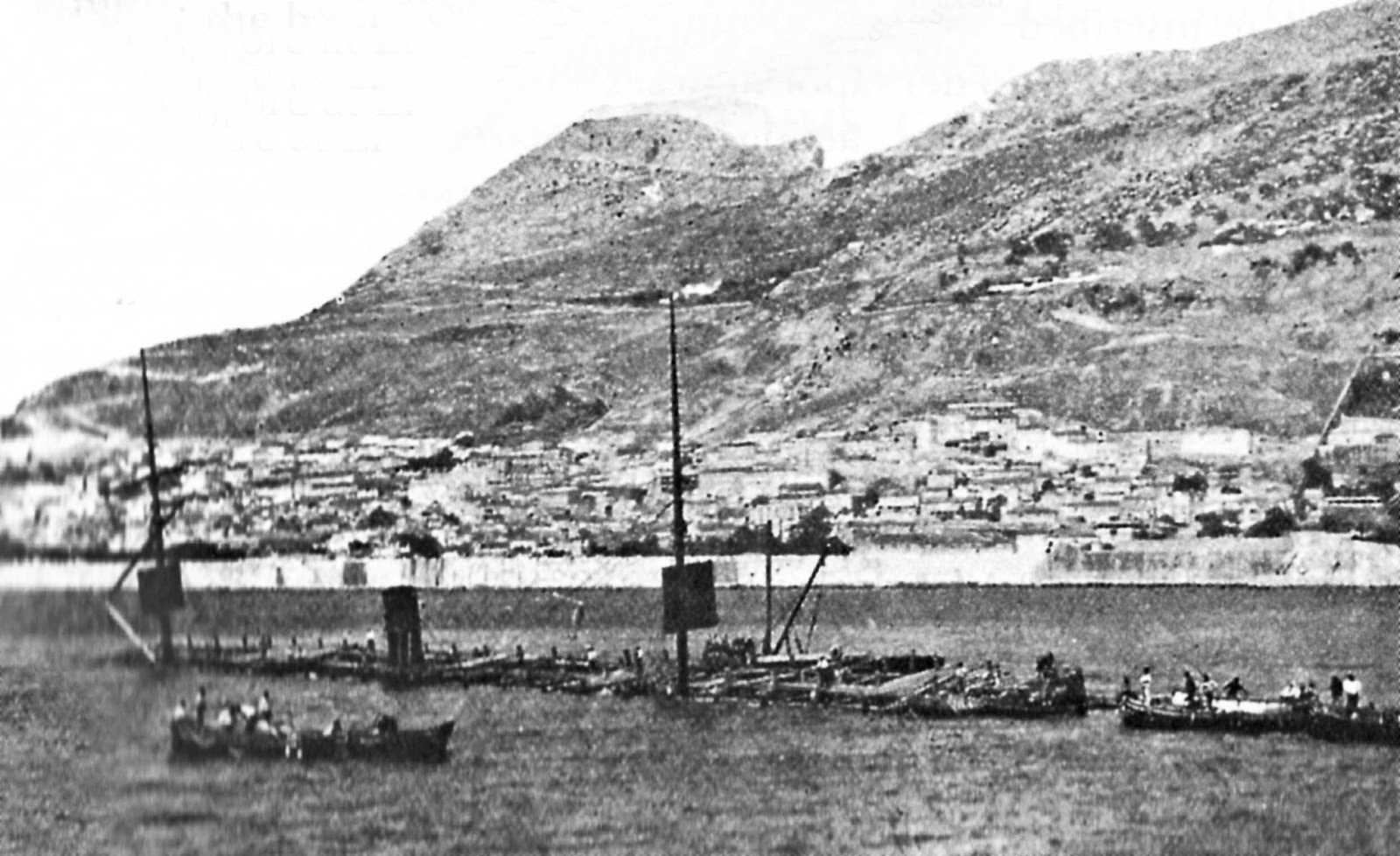
Wreck of Utopia in Gibraltar Harbour

Anson, named after Admiral and First Lord of the Admiralty, George Anson, 1st Baron Anson, was the sixth ship of her name to serve in the Royal Navy. The ship was laid down at Pembroke Dockyard on 24 April 1883, launched on 17 February 1886 and was delivered at Portsmouth in March 1887, complete except for her main armament, at a cost of £662,582. She was finally commissioned on 28 May 1889 as the flagship of the second-in-command of the Channel Fleet. On 17 March 1891, the passenger steamer SS Utopia was accidentally blown onto the ram of the anchored Anson during a strong gale in the Bay of Gibraltar. 562 of Utopia's passengers and crew and two rescuers from the armoured cruiser Immortalité were killed in the accident. Anson did not report any injuries or damage.

In September 1893, Anson was transferred to the Mediterranean, where she served until January 1900, with a refit at Malta in 1896. She returned home and paid off at Devonport in January 1901, re-commissioning for the newly formed Home Fleet in March of the same year. She served as guard ship at Queensferry under Captain William Fisher in 1902, and took part in the fleet review held at Spithead on 16 August 1902 for the coronation of King Edward VII. In May 1904, Anson finally paid off into reserve, where she remained until she was sold for scrap on 13 July 1909. The ship was sold for £21,200 and subsequently broken up at Upnor.
